= Impressionism =

19th-century art movement

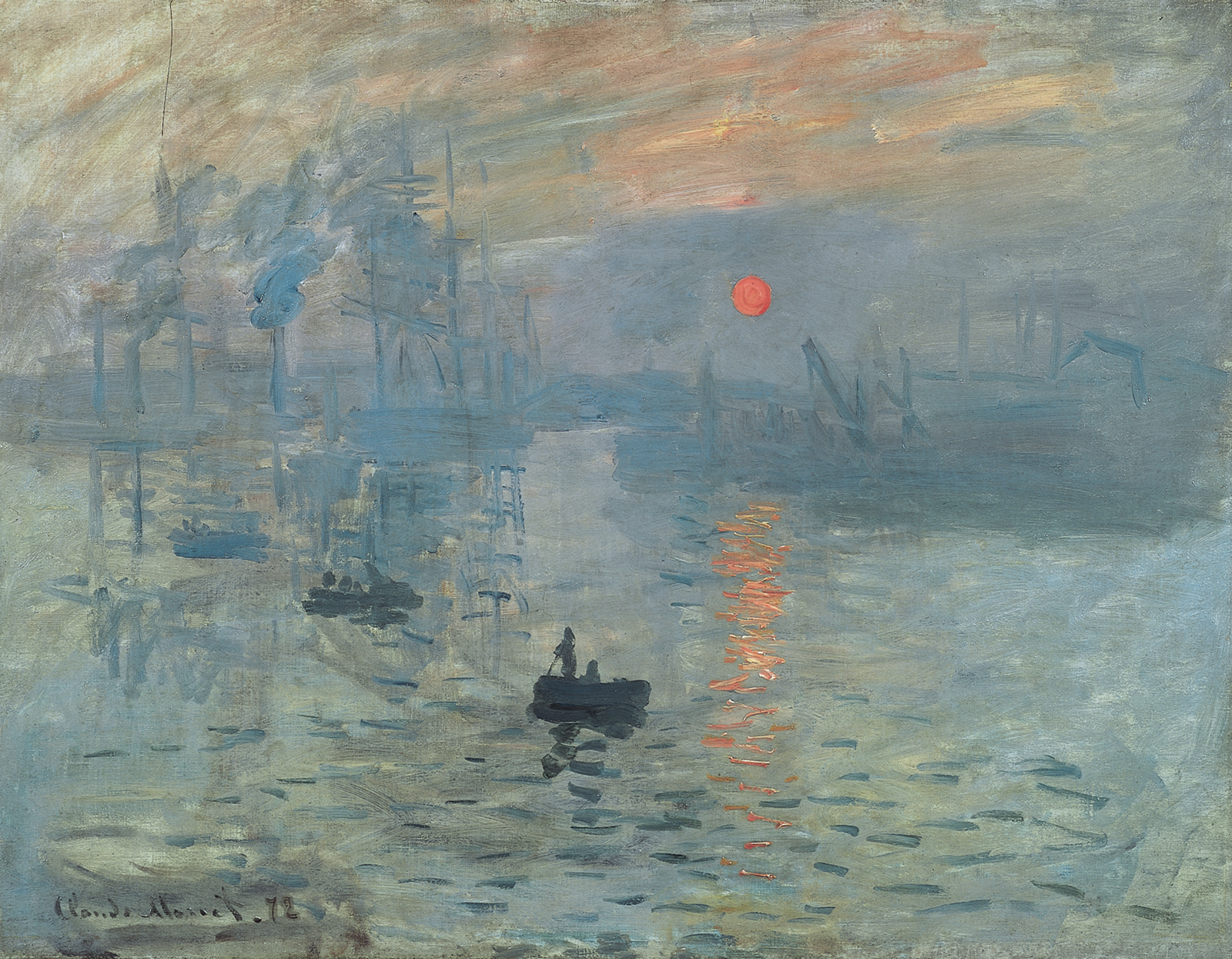
- Impression, Sunrise, (Note: Title in French: Impression, soleil levant) an 1872 Claude Monet oil on canvas painting now housed at Musée Marmottan Monet in Paris. This painting became the source of the movement's name after Louis Leroy's 1874 article, "The Exhibition of the Impressionists", satirically implied that the painting was, at most, a sketch.

Additional media
- Location: France
- Influences: Realism, Barbizon School
- Influenced: Post-Impressionism; Neo-Impressionism; Expressionism

Impressionism was a 19th-century art movement characterised by visible brush strokes, open composition, emphasis on accurate depiction of light in its changing qualities (often accentuating the effects of the passage of time), ordinary subject matter, unusual visual angles, and inclusion of movement as a crucial element of human perception and experience. Impressionism originated with a group of Paris-based artists whose independent exhibitions brought them to prominence during the 1870s and 1880s.

The Impressionists faced harsh opposition from the conventional art community in France. The name of the style derives from the title of a Claude Monet work, Impression, Sunrise, which provoked the critic Louis Leroy to coin the term in a satirical 1874 review of the First Impressionist Exhibition published in the Parisian newspaper Le Charivari. The development of Impressionism in the visual arts was soon followed by analogous styles in other media that became known as Impressionist music and Impressionist literature.

== Overview ==
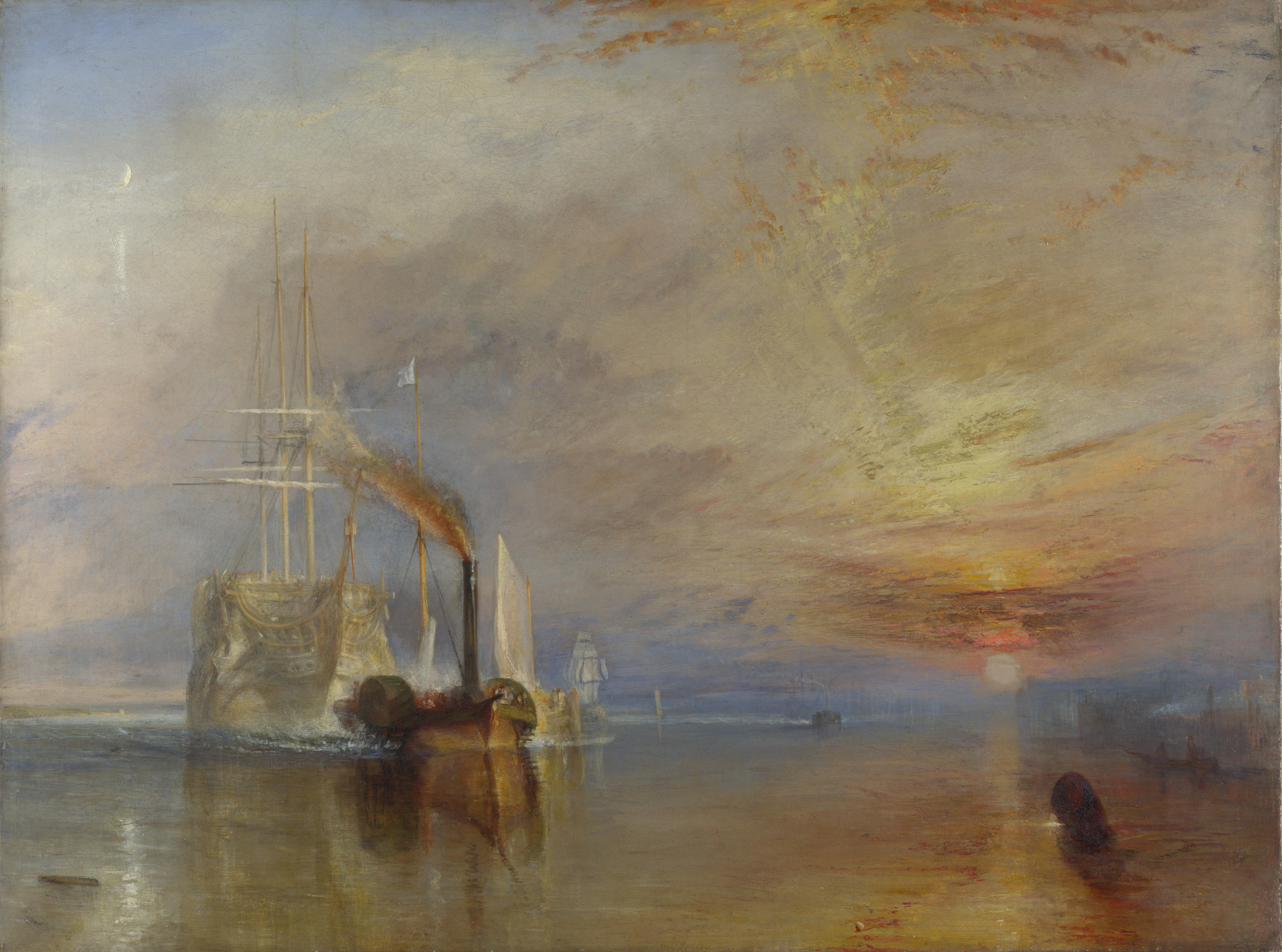
J. M. W. Turner's atmospheric work was influential on the birth of Impressionism, here The Fighting Temeraire (1839).

Radicals in their time, the early Impressionists violated the rules of academic painting. They constructed their pictures from freely brushed colours that took precedence over lines and contours, following the example of painters such as Eugène Delacroix and J. M. W. Turner. They also painted realistic scenes of everyday life in natural settings, often outdoors, attempting to capture a moment as experienced.

Previously, paintings were accomplished in studio, whether landscape art, still life or portrait, with an emphasis on verisimilitude. (Note: Exceptions include Canaletto, who painted outside and may have used the camera obscura.) The Impressionists found that they could capture the momentary and transient effects of sunlight by painting outdoors or en plein air. They portrayed overall visual effects instead of details, and used short "broken" brush strokes of mixed and pure unmixed colour—not blended smoothly or shaded, as was customary—to achieve an effect of intense colour vibration.

Pierre-Auguste Renoir – Dance at Le Moulin de la Galette (Note: Title in French: Bal du moulin de la Galette) (1876), Musée d'Orsay, one of Impressionism's most celebrated masterpieces.

Impressionism emerged in France at the same time that a number of other painters, including the Italian artists known as the Macchiaioli, and Winslow Homer in the United States, were also exploring plein-air painting. The Impressionists, however, developed new techniques specific to the style. Encompassing what its adherents argued was a different way of seeing, it is an art of immediacy and movement, of candid poses and compositions, of the play of light expressed in a bright and varied use of colour. In 1876, the poet and critic Stéphane Mallarmé said of the new style: "The represented subject, being composed of a harmony of reflected and ever-changing lights, cannot be supposed always to look the same but palpitates with movement, light, and life".

The public, at first hostile, gradually came to believe that the Impressionists had captured a fresh and original vision, even if the art critics and art establishment disapproved of the new style. By recreating the sensation in the eye that views the subject, rather than delineating the details of the subject, and by creating a welter of techniques and forms, Impressionism is a precursor of various painting styles, including Post-Impressionism, Fauvism, and Cubism.

== The Impressionism art movement ==
=== The First Impressionist Exhibition 1874 ===
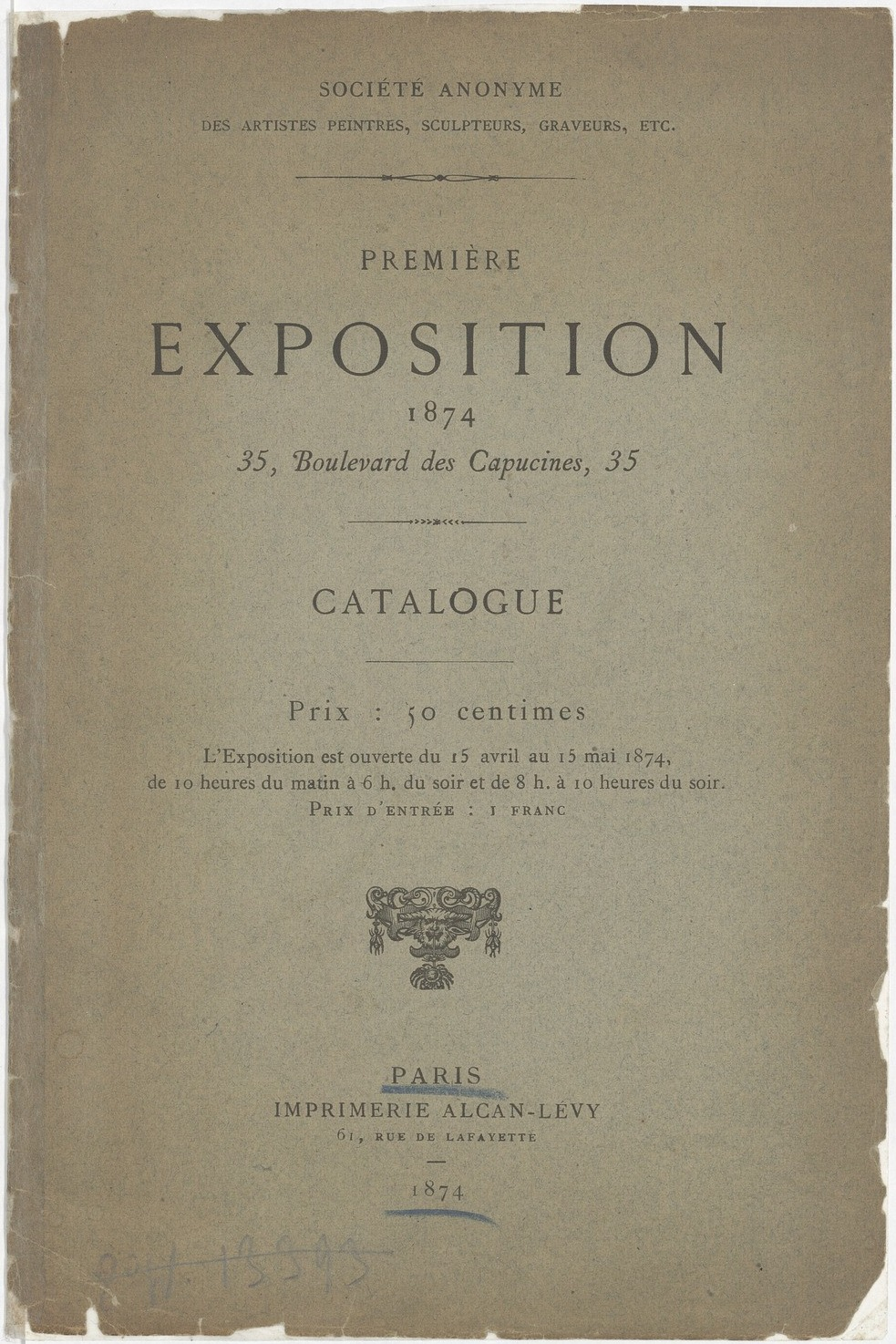
Catalogue cover from the First Impressionist Exhibition (1874)

In the middle of the 19th century—a time of rapid industrialisation and unsettling social change in France, as Emperor Napoleon III rebuilt Paris and waged war—the Académie des Beaux-Arts dominated French art. The Académie was the preserver of traditional French painting standards of content and style. Historical subjects, religious themes, and portraits were valued; landscape and still life were not. The Académie preferred carefully finished images that looked realistic when examined closely. Paintings in this style were made up of precise brush strokes carefully blended to hide the artist's hand in the work. Colour was restrained and often toned down further by the application of a thick golden varnish.

The Académie had an annual, juried art show, the Salon de Paris, and artists whose work was displayed in the show won prizes, garnered commissions, and enhanced their prestige. The standards of the juries represented the values of the Académie, represented by the works of such artists as Jean-Léon Gérôme and Alexandre Cabanel. Using an eclectic mix of techniques and formulas established in Western painting since the Renaissance, such as linear perspective and figure types derived from Classical Greek art, these artists produced escapist visions of a reassuringly ordered world. By the 1850s, some artists, notably the Realist painter Gustave Courbet, had gained public attention and critical censure by depicting contemporary realities without the idealisation demanded by the Académie.

In the early 1860s, four young painters—Claude Monet, Pierre-Auguste Renoir, Alfred Sisley, and Frédéric Bazille—met while studying under the academic artist Charles Gleyre. They discovered that they shared an interest in painting landscape and contemporary life rather than historical or mythological scenes. Following a practice—pioneered by artists such as the Englishman John Constable— that had become increasingly popular by mid-century, they often ventured into the countryside together to paint in the open air. Their purpose was not to make sketches to be developed into carefully finished works in the studio, as was the usual custom, but to complete their paintings out-of-doors.

By painting in sunlight directly from nature, and making bold use of the vivid synthetic pigments that had become available since the beginning of the century, they began to develop a lighter and brighter manner of painting that extended further the Realism of Courbet and the Barbizon school. A favourite meeting place for the artists was the Café Guerbois on Avenue de Clichy in Paris, where the discussions were often led by Édouard Manet, whom the younger artists greatly admired. They were soon joined by Camille Pissarro, Paul Cézanne, and Armand Guillaumin.

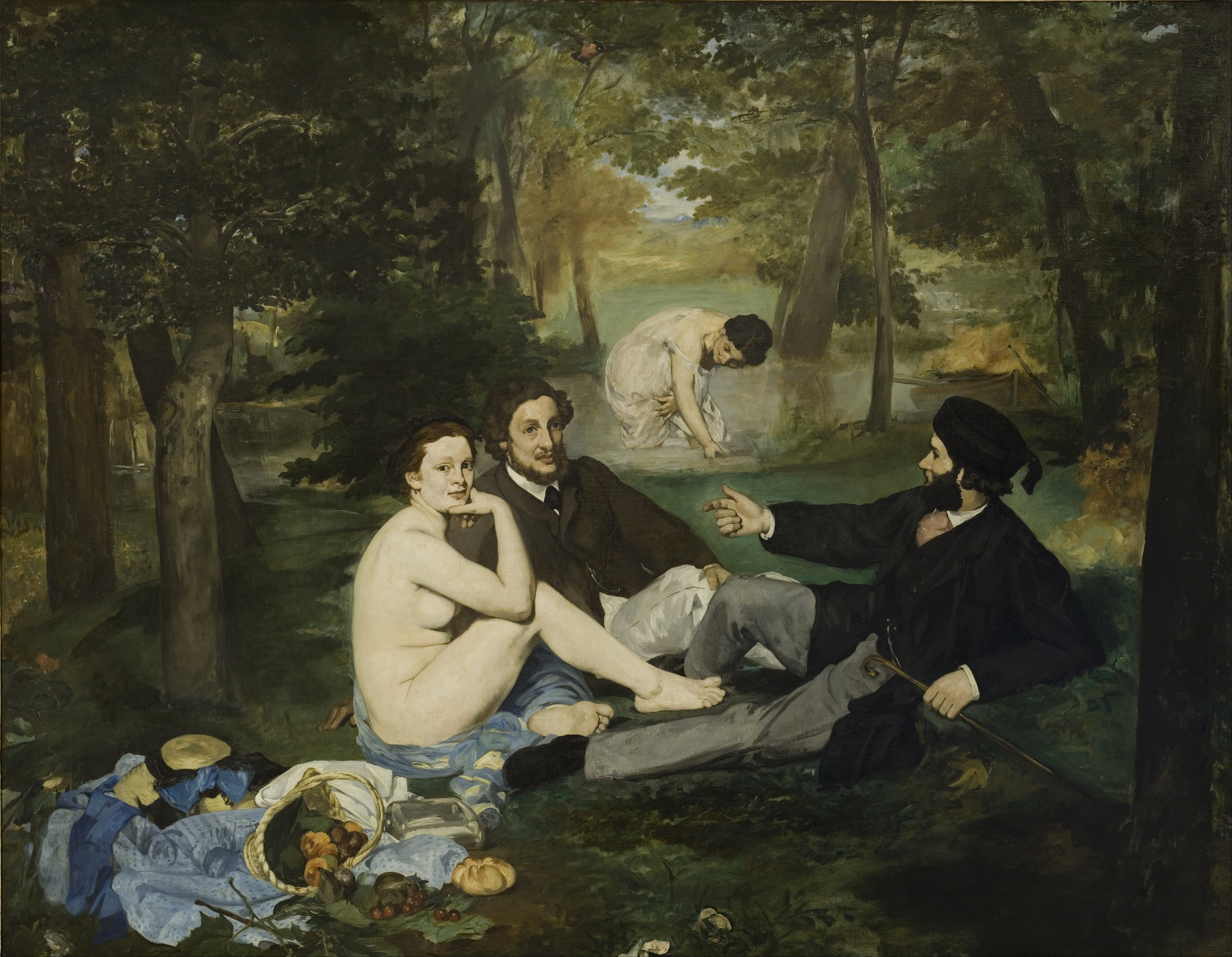
Édouard Manet – Le déjeuner sur l'herbe, 'The Luncheon on the Grass' 1863

During the 1860s, the Salon jury routinely rejected about half of the works submitted by Monet and his friends in favour of works by artists faithful to the approved style. In 1863, the Salon jury rejected Manet's Le déjeuner sur l'herbe, 'The Luncheon on the Grass', primarily because it depicted a nude woman with two clothed men at a picnic. While the Salon jury routinely accepted nudes in historical and allegorical paintings, they condemned Manet for placing a realistic nude in a contemporary setting. The jury's severely worded rejection of Manet's painting appalled his admirers, and the unusually large number of rejected works that year perturbed many French artists.

After Emperor Napoleon III saw the rejected works of 1863, he decreed that the public be allowed to judge the work themselves, and the French: Salon des Refusés, lit. 'Salon of the Refused' was organised. While many viewers came only to laugh, the Salon des Refusés drew attention to the existence of a new tendency in art and attracted more visitors than the regular Salon.

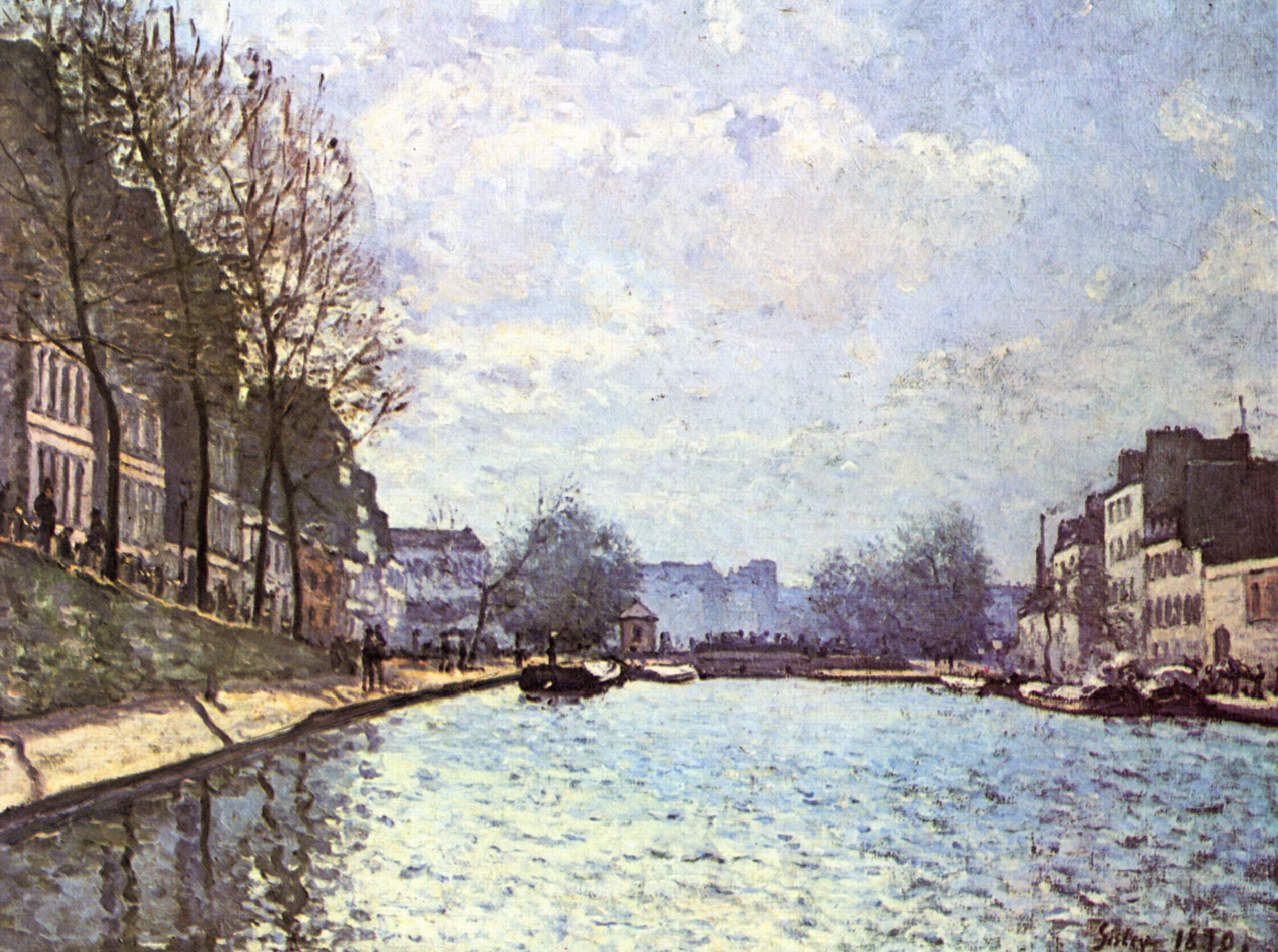
Alfred Sisley – View of the Canal Saint-Martin (1870), Musée d'Orsay

Artists' petitions requesting a new Salon des Refusés in 1867, and again in 1872, were denied. In December 1873, Monet, Renoir, Pissarro, Sisley, Cézanne, Berthe Morisot, Edgar Degas and several other artists founded the Société anonyme des artistes peintres, sculpteurs, graveurs, etc., 'Anonymous Society of painters, sculptors, engravers, etc.' to exhibit their artworks independently. Members of the association were expected to forswear participation in the Salon. The organisers invited a number of other progressive artists to join them in their inaugural exhibition, including the older Eugène Boudin, whose example had first persuaded Monet to adopt plein air painting years before. Another painter who greatly influenced Monet and his friends, Johan Jongkind, declined to participate, as did Édouard Manet. In total, thirty artists participated in their first exhibition, held in April 1874 at the studio of the photographer Nadar.

=== Critical response to Impressionism ===
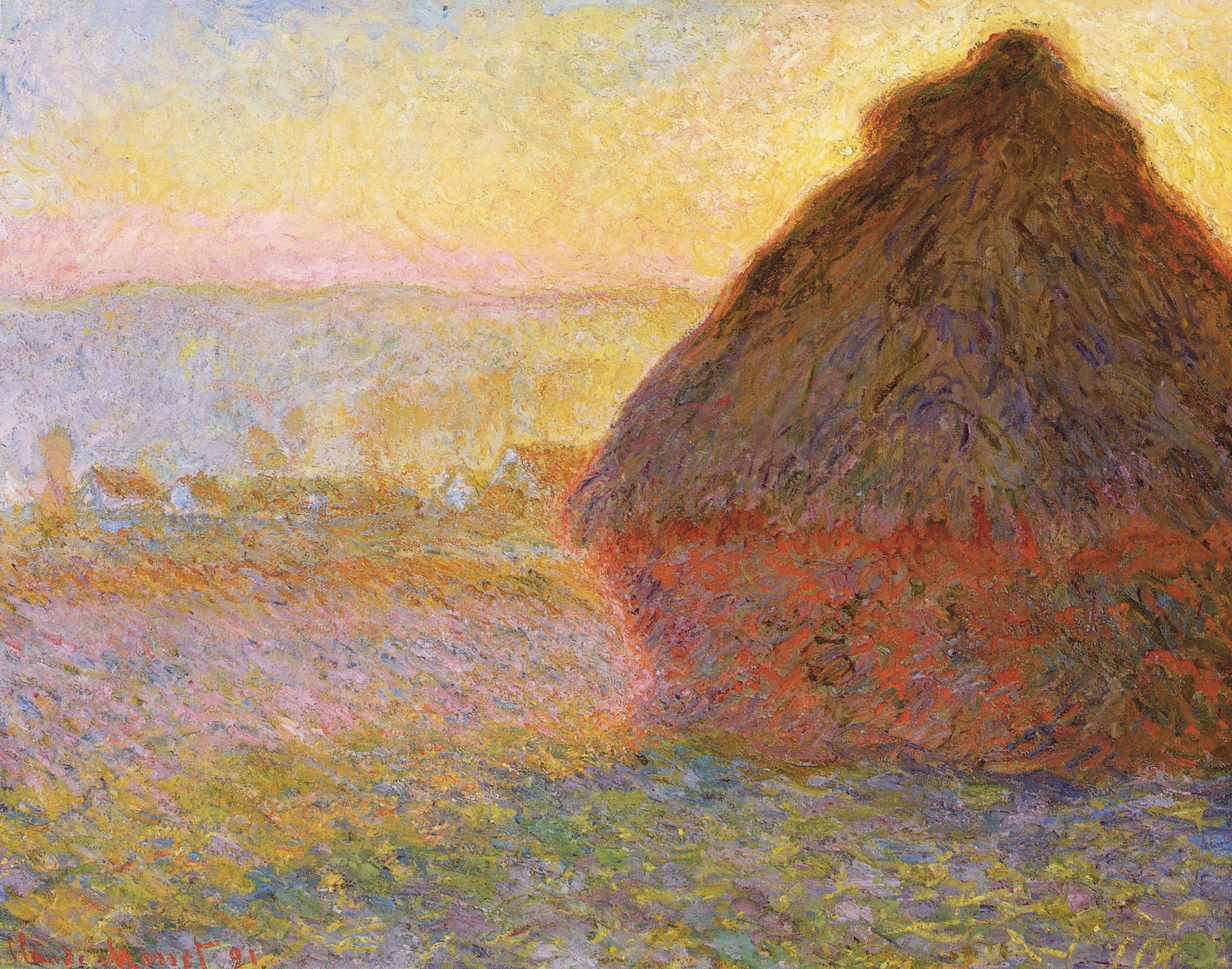
Claude Monet – Haystacks, (sunset) (1890–1891), Museum of Fine Arts Boston

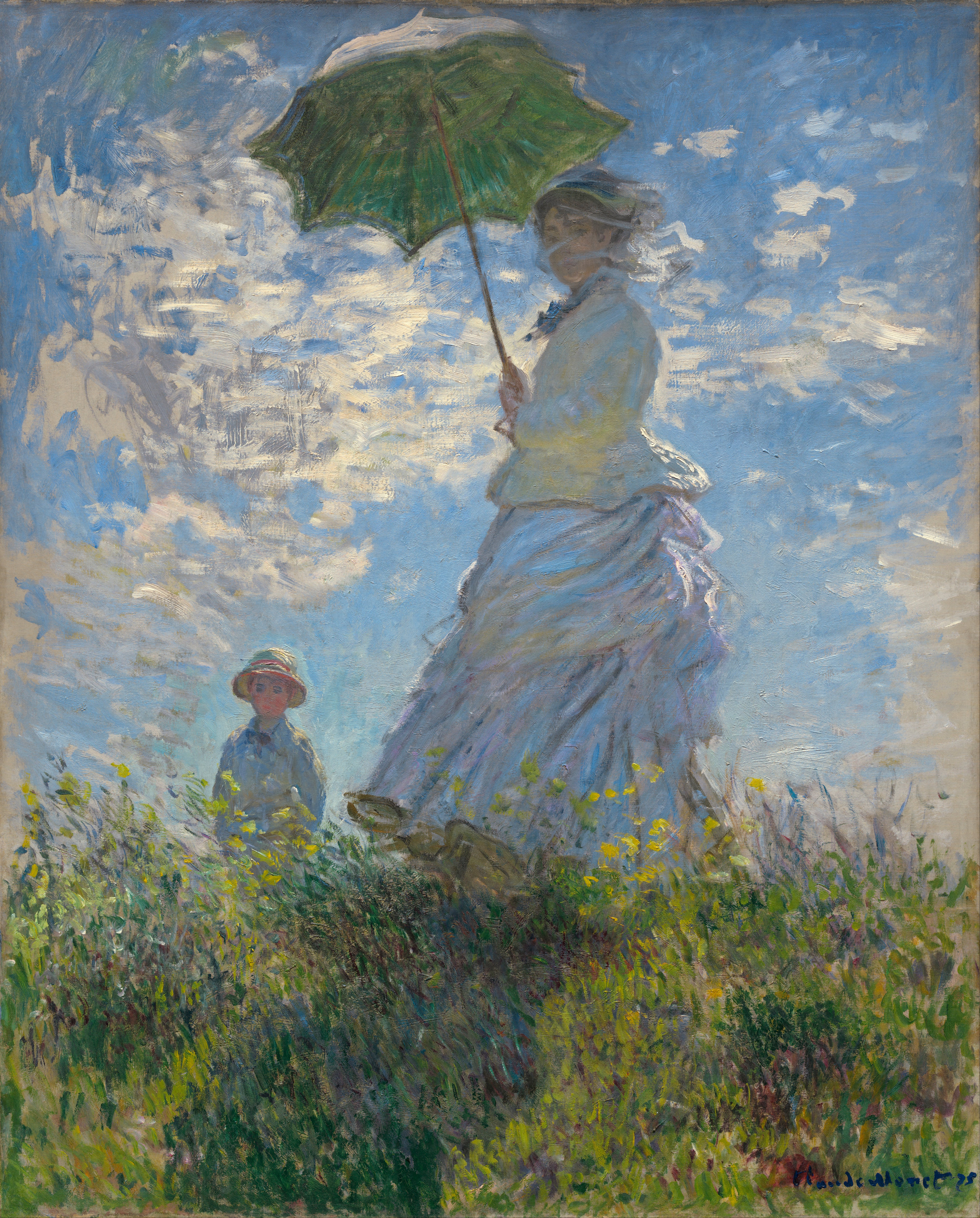
Claude Monet – Woman with a Parasol – Madame Monet and Her Son (1875), National Gallery of Art Washington

The critical response was mixed. Monet and Cézanne received the harshest attacks. Critic and humorist Louis Leroy wrote a scathing review in the newspaper Le Charivari in which, making wordplay with the title of Claude Monet's Impression, Sunrise, he gave the artists the name by which they became known. Derisively titling his article "The Exhibition of the Impressionists", Leroy declared that Monet's painting was at most, a sketch, and could hardly be termed a finished work.

He wrote, in the form of a dialogue between viewers,

"Impression—I was certain of it. I was just telling myself that, since I was impressed, there had to be some impression in it ... and what freedom, what ease of workmanship! Wallpaper in its embryonic state is more finished than that seascape."

The term Impressionist quickly gained favour with the public. It was also accepted by the artists themselves, even though they were a diverse group in style and temperament, unified primarily by their spirit of independence and rebellion. They exhibited together regardless of shifting membership eight times between 1874 and 1886. The Impressionists' style, with its loose, spontaneous brushstrokes, would soon become synonymous with modern life. Monet, Sisley, Morisot, and Pissarro may be considered the "purest" Impressionists, in their consistent pursuit of an art of spontaneity, sunlight, and colour. Degas rejected much of this, as he believed in the primacy of drawing over colour and belittled the practice of painting outdoors. Renoir turned away from Impressionism for a time during the 1880s, and never entirely regained his commitment to its ideas. Édouard Manet, although regarded by the Impressionists as their leader, never abandoned his liberal use of black as a colour (while Impressionists avoided its use and preferred to obtain darker colours by mixing), and never participated in the Impressionist exhibitions. He continued to submit his works to the Salon, where his painting Spanish Singer had won a 2nd class medal in 1861, and he urged the others to do likewise, arguing that "the Salon is the real field of battle" where a reputation could be made.

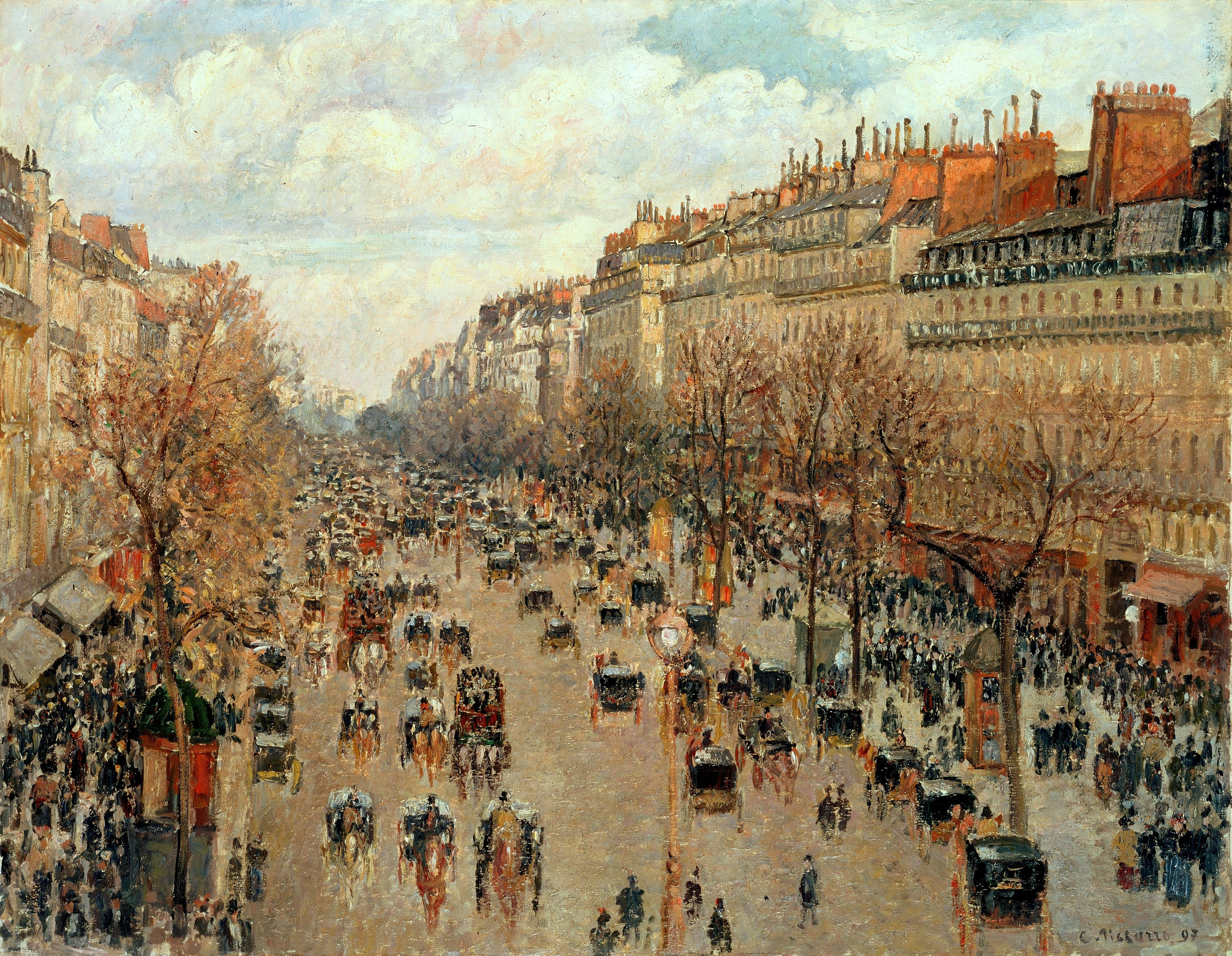
Camille Pissarro – Boulevard Montmartre (1897), Hermitage Saint Petersburg

The artists of the core group gradually reduced. Bazille died in the Franco-Prussian War in 1870. Defections occurred as Cézanne, followed later by Renoir, Sisley, and Monet, abstained from the group exhibitions so they could submit their works to the Salon. Disagreements arose from issues such as Guillaumin's membership in the group, championed by Pissarro and Cézanne against opposition from Monet and Degas, who thought him unworthy. Degas invited Mary Cassatt to display her work in the 1879 exhibition, but also insisted on the inclusion of Jean-François Raffaëlli, Ludovic Lepic, and other realists who did not represent Impressionist practices, causing Monet in 1880 to accuse the Impressionists of "opening doors to first-come daubers".

In this regard, the seventh Paris Impressionist exhibition in 1882 was the most selective of all including the works of only nine "true" impressionists, namely Gustave Caillebotte, Paul Gauguin, Armand Guillaumin, Claude Monet, Berthe Morisot, Camille Pissarro, Pierre-Auguste Renoir, Alfred Sisley, and Victor Vignon. The group then divided again over the invitations to Paul Signac and Georges Seurat to exhibit with them at the 8th Impressionist exhibition in 1886. Pissarro was the only artist to show at all eight Paris Impressionist exhibitions.

=== Commercial success ===
The individual artists achieved few financial rewards from the Impressionist exhibitions, but their art gradually won a degree of public acceptance and support. Their art dealer was Paul Durand-Ruel, who played a major role as he kept works of Impressionism in the public realm and accessible to French citizens. He also arranged shows for the Paris Impressionists in London and New York. Although Sisley died in poverty in 1899, Renoir had a great Salon success in 1879. Monet became secure financially during the early 1880s and so did Pissarro by the early 1890s. By this time the methods of Impressionist painting, in a diluted form, had become commonplace in Salon art.

== 20th-century presentation of Impressionism ==
Impressionism was a 19th century art movement. In the early 20th century different views emerged on how artistic works of Impressionism should be exhibited to the general public. Françoise Cachin insisted that Impressionism should be contextualised by arranging a selection of historic objects so as suggest progress. René Huyghe and Georges Salles in the summer of 1945 celebrated Impressionism as French art and exhibited the paintings of the core group artists alongside historic French master painters, drawing a straight aesthetic line that connected French art schools in the history of the French nation. They were acutely aware, that following World War II the Allies expected a post-nationalistic ethos of humanism. Apart from informing the public about French art history, art works of Impressionism had been placed prominently only if they were considered master works and worth teaching. The French bourgeoisie demanded straightforward realism and the core group of the Impressionism movement never claimed for themselves to have visualised intellectual or moral judgement. Impressionism alongside other early 19th century art was reduced to the ranks of large-scale epic creations for the Salon or State. Meanwhile, the curator Jean Cassou was tasked with assembling art work to fill the Musée National d'Art Moderne.

== Impressionist techniques ==
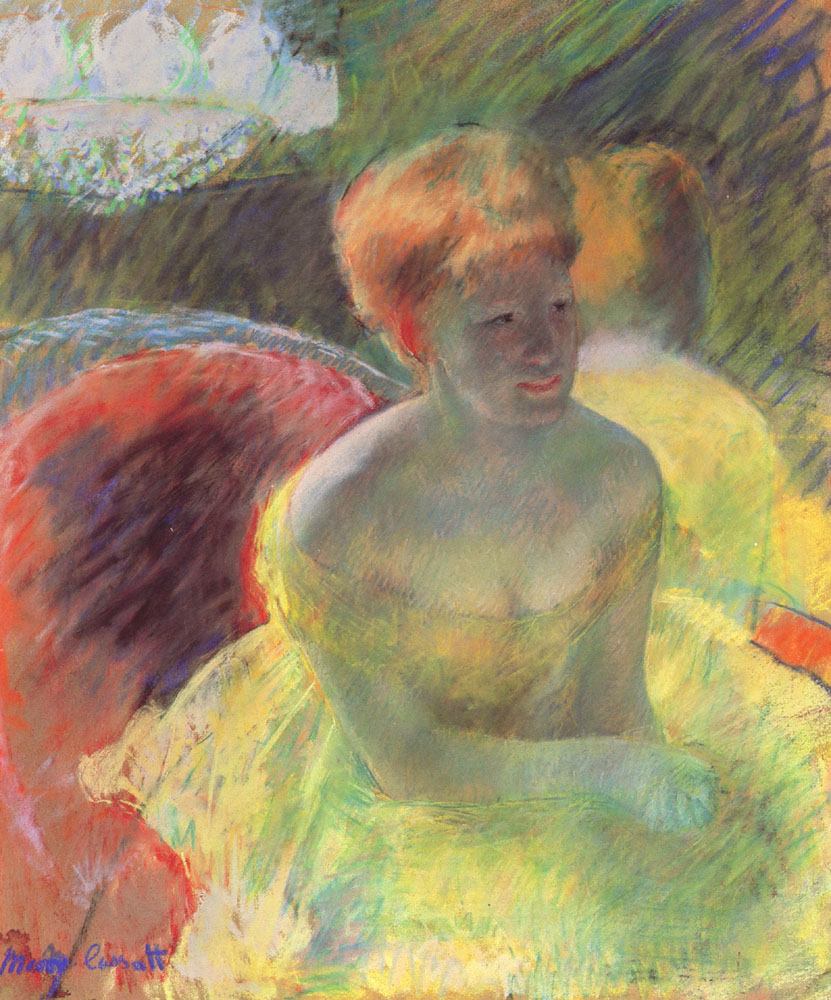
Mary Cassatt – Lydia Leaning on Her Arms (in a theatre box) (1879)

Trouville Harbor at Low Tide by Eugène Boudin, 1887, Musée de Cambrai.

French painters who prepared the way for Impressionism include the Romantic colourist Eugène Delacroix; the leader of the realists, Gustave Courbet; and painters of the Barbizon school such as Théodore Rousseau. The Impressionists learned much from the work of Johan Barthold Jongkind, Jean-Baptiste-Camille Corot, and Eugène Boudin, who painted from nature in a direct and spontaneous style that prefigured Impressionism, and who befriended and advised the younger artists.

A number of identifiable techniques and working habits contributed to the innovative style of the Impressionists. Although these methods had been used by previous artists—and are often conspicuous in the work of artists such as Frans Hals, Diego Velázquez, Peter Paul Rubens, John Constable, and J. M. W. Turner—the Impressionists were the first to use them all together, and with such consistency. These techniques include:

- Short, thick strokes of paint quickly capture the essence of the subject, rather than its details. The paint is often applied impasto.
- Colours are applied side by side with as little mixing as possible, a technique that exploits the principle of simultaneous contrast to make the colour appear more vivid to the viewer.
- Greys and dark tones are produced by mixing complementary colours. Pure impressionism avoids the use of black paint.
- Wet paint is placed into wet paint without waiting for successive applications to dry, producing softer edges and intermingling of colour.
- Impressionist paintings do not exploit the transparency of thin paint films (glazes), which earlier artists manipulated carefully to produce effects. The impressionist painting surface is typically opaque.
- The paint is applied to a white or light-coloured ground. Previously, painters often used dark grey or strongly coloured grounds.
- The play of natural light is emphasised. Close attention is paid to the reflection of colours from object to object. Painters often worked in the evening to produce effets de soir—the shadowy effects of evening or twilight.
- In paintings made en plein air (outdoors), shadows are boldly painted with the blue of the sky as it is reflected onto surfaces, giving a sense of freshness previously not represented in painting. Blue shadows on snow inspired the technique.

New technology played a role in the development of the style. Impressionists took advantage of the mid-century introduction of premixed paints in tin tubes (resembling modern toothpaste tubes), which allowed artists to work more spontaneously, both outdoors and indoors. Previously, painters made their own paints individually, by grinding and mixing dry pigment powders with linseed oil, which were then stored in animal bladders.

Many vivid synthetic pigments became commercially available to artists for the first time during the 19th century. These included cobalt blue, viridian, cadmium yellow, and synthetic ultramarine blue, all of which were in use by the 1840s, before Impressionism. The Impressionists' manner of painting made bold use of these pigments, and of even newer colours such as cerulean blue, which became commercially available to artists in the 1860s.

The Impressionists' progress toward a brighter style of painting was gradual. During the 1860s, Monet and Renoir sometimes painted on canvases prepared with the traditional red-brown or grey ground. By the 1870s, Monet, Renoir, and Pissarro usually chose to paint on grounds of a lighter grey or beige colour, which functioned as a middle tone in the finished painting. By the 1880s, some of the Impressionists had come to prefer white or slightly off-white grounds, and no longer allowed the ground colour a significant role in the finished painting.

== Content and composition ==
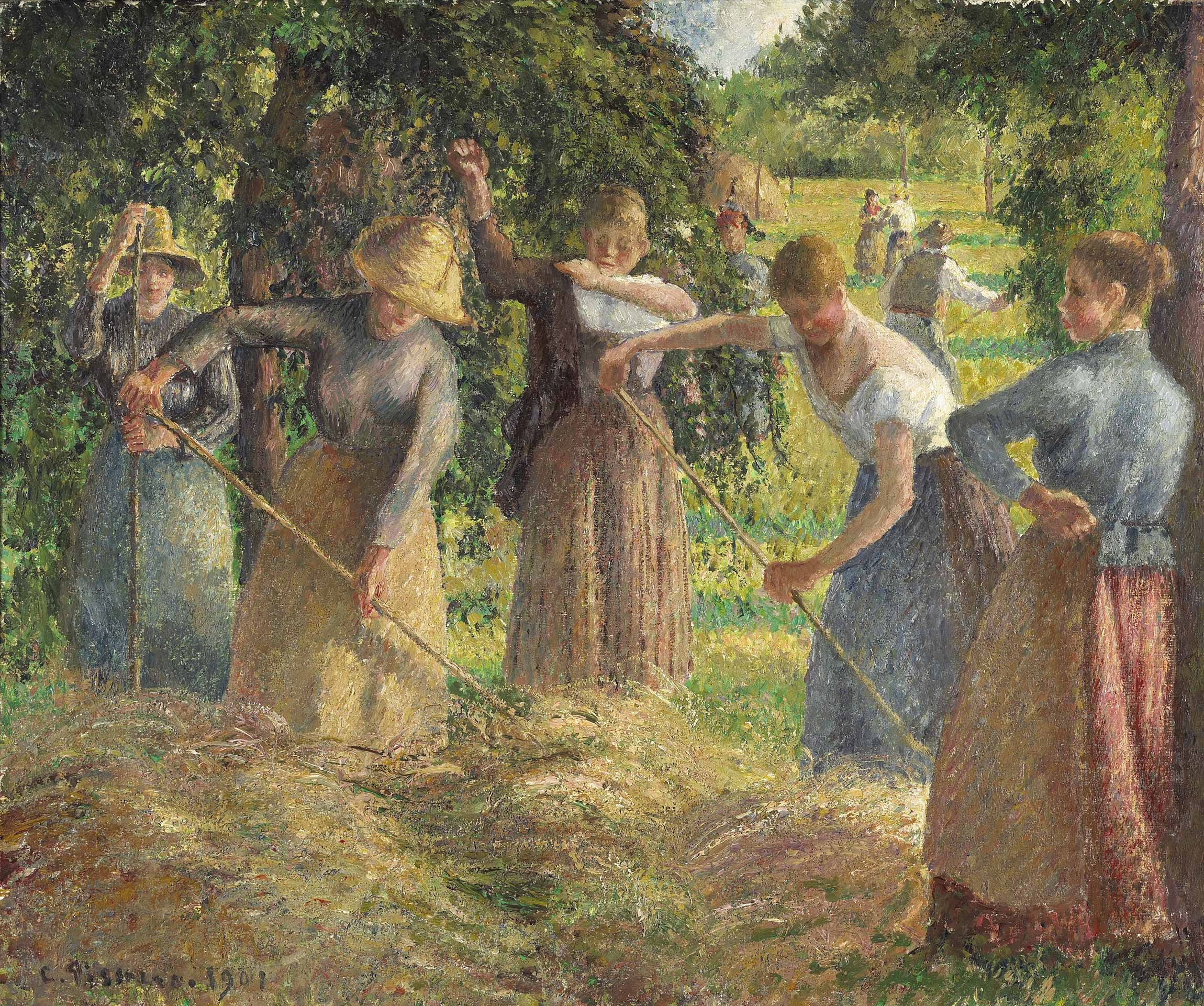
Camille Pissarro – Hay Harvest at Éragny (1901), National Gallery of Canada

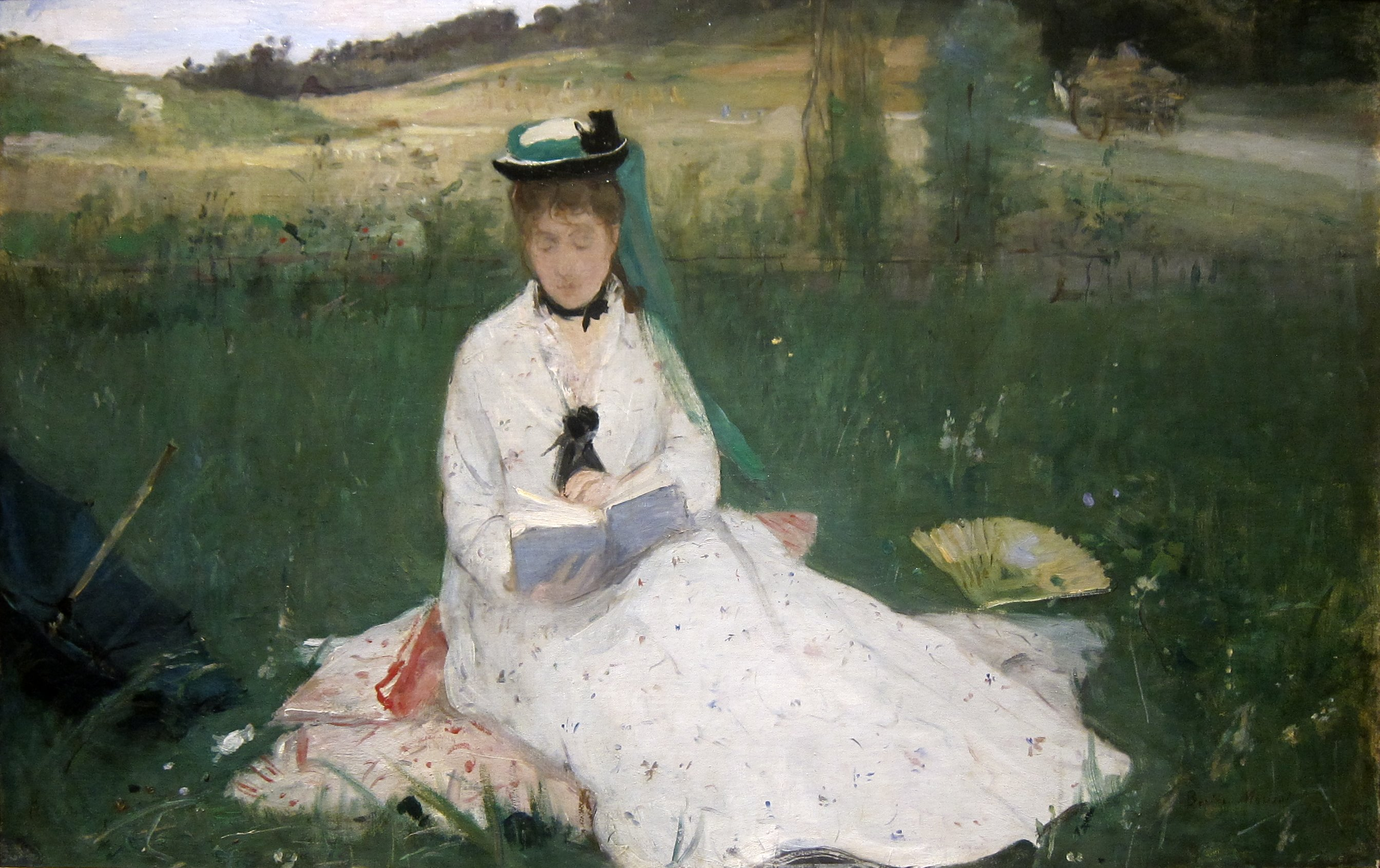
Berthe Morisot – Reading (1873), Cleveland Museum of Art

The Impressionists reacted to modernity by exploring "a wide range of non-academic subjects in art" such as middle-class leisure activities and "urban themes, including train stations, cafés, brothels, the theater, and dance". They found inspiration in the newly widened avenues of Paris, bounded by new tall buildings that offered opportunities to depict bustling crowds, popular entertainments, and nocturnal lighting in artificially closed-off spaces.

A painting such as Caillebotte's Paris Street; Rainy Day (1877) strikes a modern note by emphasising the isolation of individuals amid the outsized buildings and spaces of the urban environment. When painting landscapes, the Impressionists did not hesitate to include the factories that were proliferating in the countryside. Earlier painters of landscapes had conventionally avoided smokestacks and other signs of industrialisation, regarding them as blights on nature's order and unworthy of art.

Prior to the Impressionists, other painters, notably such 17th-century Dutch painters as Jan Steen, had emphasised common subjects, but their methods of composition were traditional. They arranged their compositions so that the main subject commanded the viewer's attention. J. M. W. Turner, while an artist of the Romantic era, anticipated the style of impressionism with his artwork. The Impressionists relaxed the boundary between subject and background so that the effect of an Impressionist painting often resembles a snapshot, a part of a larger reality captured as if by chance. Photography was gaining popularity, and as cameras became more portable, photographs became more candid. Photography inspired Impressionists to represent momentary action, not only in the fleeting lights of a landscape, but in the day-to-day lives of people.

The development of Impressionism can be considered partly as a reaction by artists to the challenge presented by photography, which seemed to devalue the artist's skill in reproducing reality. Both portrait and landscape paintings were deemed somewhat deficient and lacking in truth as photography "produced lifelike images much more efficiently and reliably".

In spite of this, photography actually inspired artists to pursue other means of creative expression, and rather than compete with photography to emulate reality, artists focused "on the one thing they could inevitably do better than the photograph—by further developing into an art form its very subjectivity in the conception of the image, the very subjectivity that photography eliminated". The Impressionists sought to express their perceptions of nature, rather than create exact representations. This allowed artists to depict subjectively what they saw with their "tacit imperatives of taste and conscience". Photography encouraged painters to exploit aspects of the painting medium, like colour, which photography then lacked: "The Impressionists were the first to consciously offer a subjective alternative to the photograph".

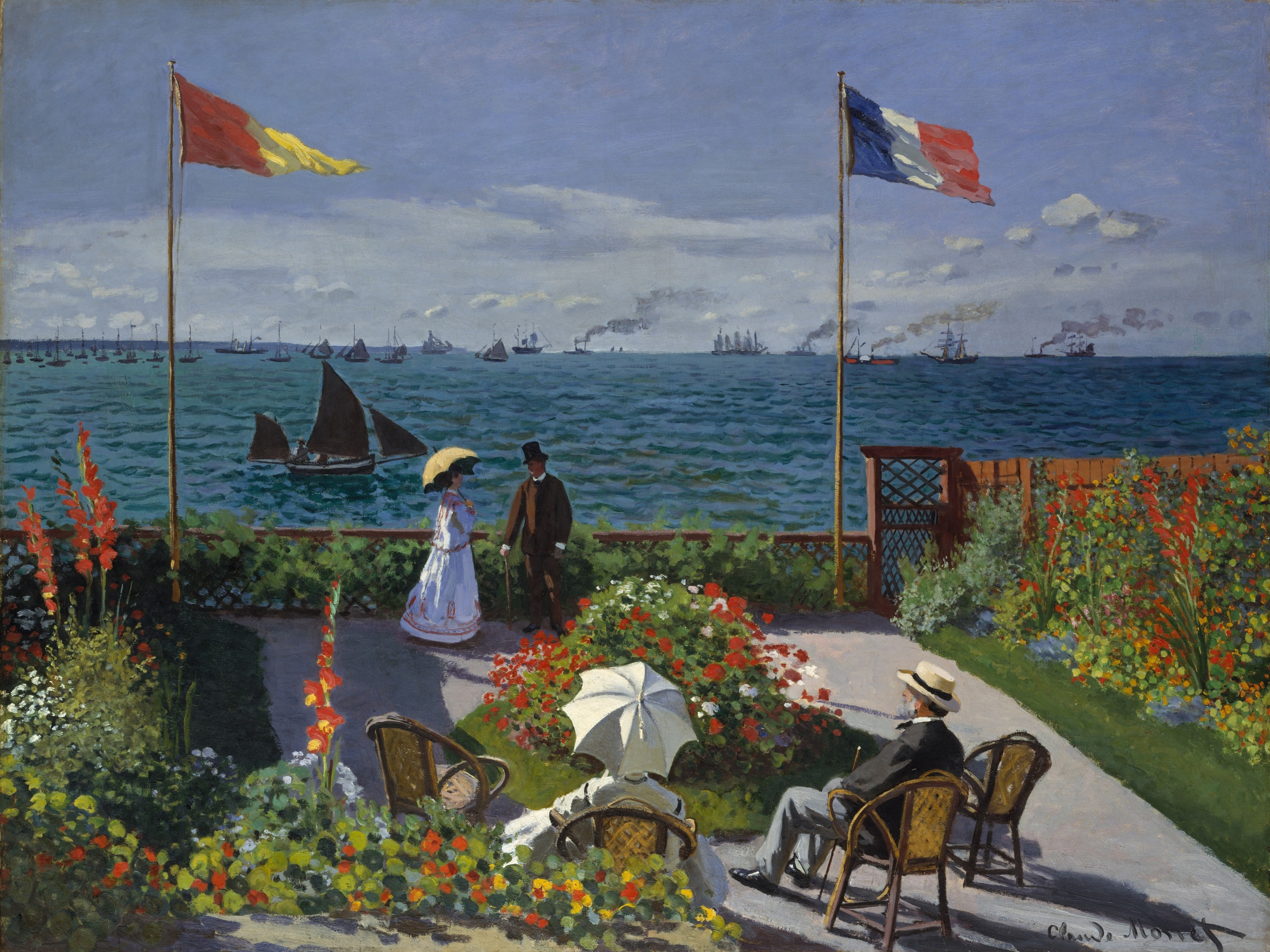
Claude Monet – Jardin à Sainte-Adresse (1867), Metropolitan Museum of Art. A work showing the influence of Japanese prints

Another major influence was Japanese ukiyo-e art prints (Japonism). The art of these prints contributed significantly to the "snapshot" angles and unconventional compositions that became characteristic of Impressionism. An example is Monet's Jardin à Sainte-Adresse (1867), with its bold blocks of colour and composition on a strong diagonal slant showing the influence of Japanese prints.

Edgar Degas was both an avid photographer and a collector of Japanese prints. His The Dance Class (La classe de danse) of 1874 shows both influences in its asymmetrical composition. The dancers are seemingly caught off guard in various awkward poses, leaving an expanse of empty floor space in the lower right quadrant.

== Female Impressionists ==
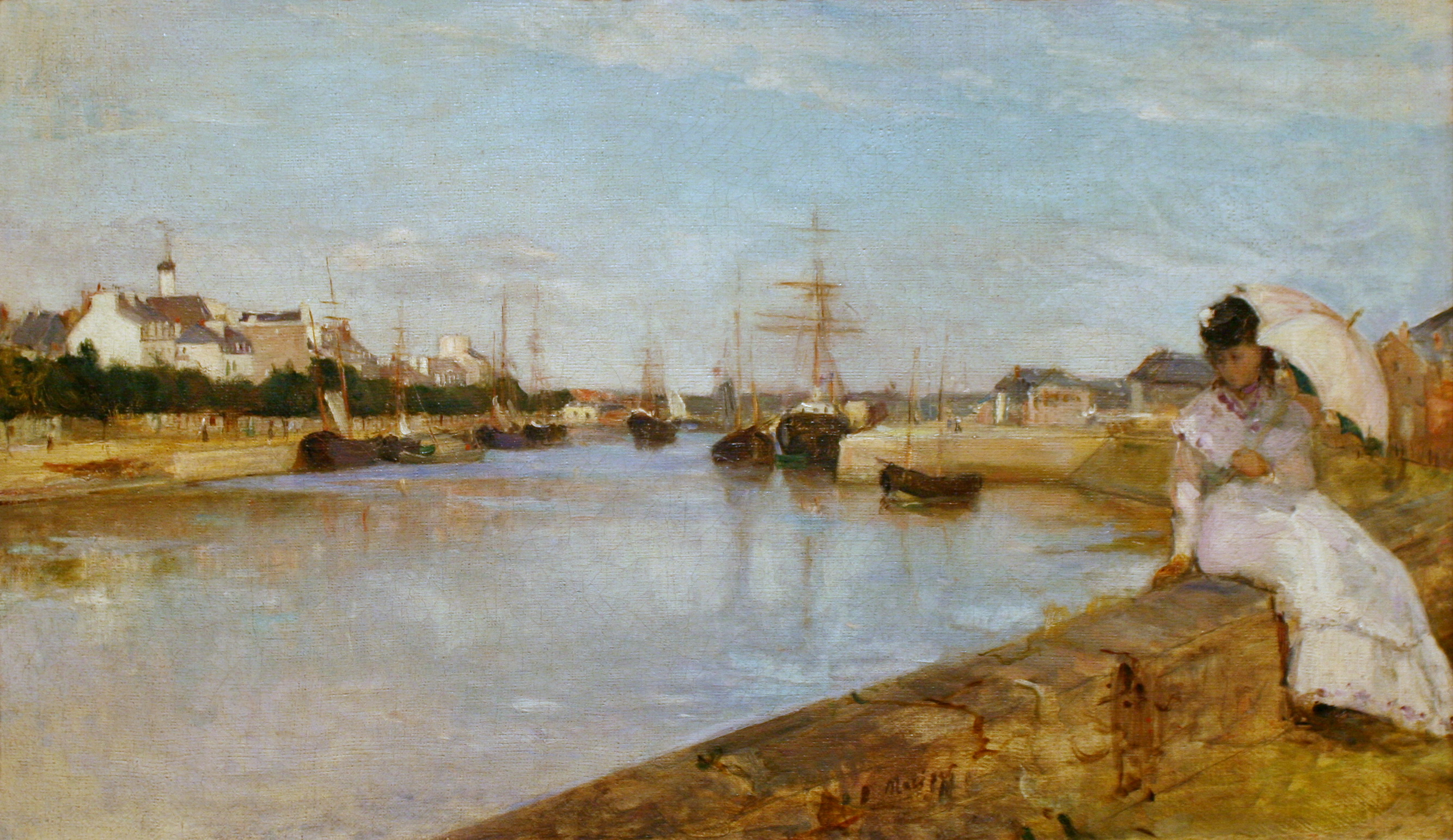
Berthe Morisot – The Harbour at Lorient (1869), National Gallery of Art Washington

Impressionists, in varying degrees, were looking for ways to depict visual experience and contemporary subjects. Female Impressionists were interested in these same ideals but had many social and career limitations compared to male Impressionists. They were particularly excluded from the imagery of the bourgeois social sphere of the boulevard, cafe, and dance hall.

As well as imagery, women were excluded from the formative discussions that resulted in meetings in those places. That was where male Impressionists were able to form and share ideas about Impressionism. In the academic realm, women were believed to be incapable of handling complex subjects, which led teachers to restrict what they taught female students. It was also considered unladylike to excel in art, since women's true talents were then believed to centre on homemaking and mothering.

Yet several women were able to find success during their lifetime, even though their careers were affected by personal circumstances – Bracquemond, for example, had a husband who was resentful of her work which caused her to give up painting. The four most well known, namely, Mary Cassatt, Eva Gonzalès, Marie Bracquemond, and Berthe Morisot, are, and were, often referred to as the 'Women Impressionists'. Their participation in the series of eight Impressionist exhibitions that took place in Paris from 1874 to 1886 varied: Morisot participated in seven, Cassatt in four, Bracquemond in three, and Gonzalès did not participate.

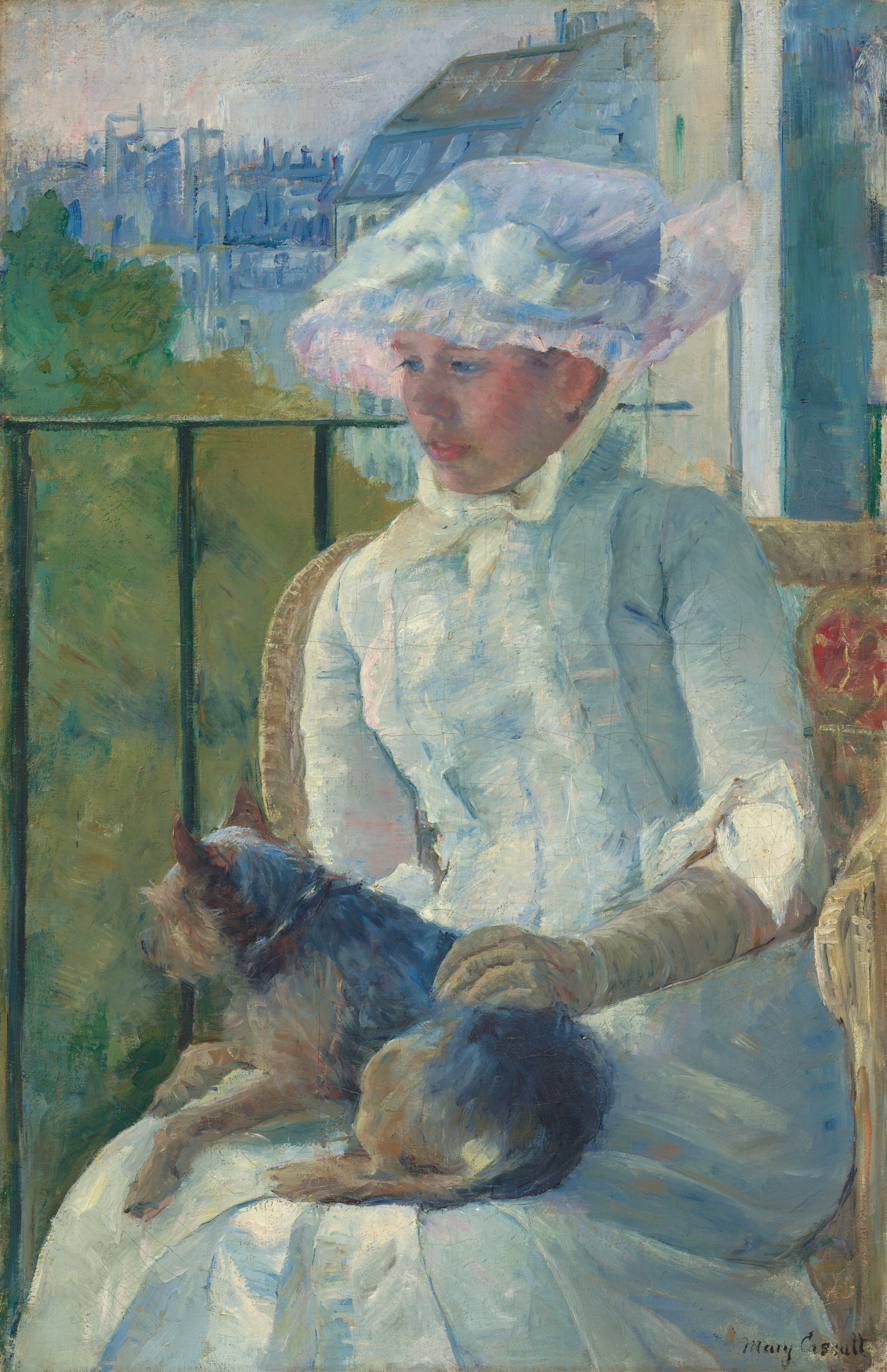
Mary Cassatt – Young Girl at a Window (1885), oil on canvas, National Gallery of Art Washington

The critics of the time lumped these four together without regard to their personal styles, techniques, or subject matter. Critics viewing their works at the exhibitions often attempted to acknowledge the women artists' talents but circumscribed them within a limited notion of femininity. Arguing for the suitability of Impressionist technique to women's manner of perception, Parisian critic S.C. de Soissons wrote:

One can understand that women have no originality of thought, and that literature and music have no feminine character; but surely women know how to observe, and what they see is quite different from that which men see, and the art which they put in their gestures, in their toilet, in the decoration of their environment is sufficient to give is the idea of an instinctive, of a peculiar genius which resides in each one of them.

While Impressionism legitimised the domestic social life as subject matter, of which women had intimate knowledge, it also tended to limit them to that subject matter. Portrayals of often-identifiable sitters in domestic settings, which could offer commissions, were dominant in the exhibitions. The subjects of the paintings were often women interacting with their environment by either their gaze or movement. Cassatt, in particular, was aware of her placement of subjects: she kept her predominantly female figures from objectification and cliche; when they are not reading, they converse, sew, drink tea, and when they are inactive, they seem lost in thought.

The women Impressionists, like their male counterparts, were striving for "truth", for new ways of seeing and new painting techniques; each artist had an individual painting style. Women Impressionists, particularly Morisot and Cassatt, were conscious of the balance of power between women and objects in their paintings – the bourgeois women depicted are not defined by decorative objects, but instead, interact with and dominate the things with which they live. There are many similarities in their depictions of women who seem both at ease and subtly confined. Gonzalès' Box at the Italian Opera depicts a woman staring into the distance, at ease in a social sphere but confined by the box and the man standing next to her. Cassatt's painting Young Girl at a Window is brighter in colour but remains constrained by the canvas edge as she looks out the window.

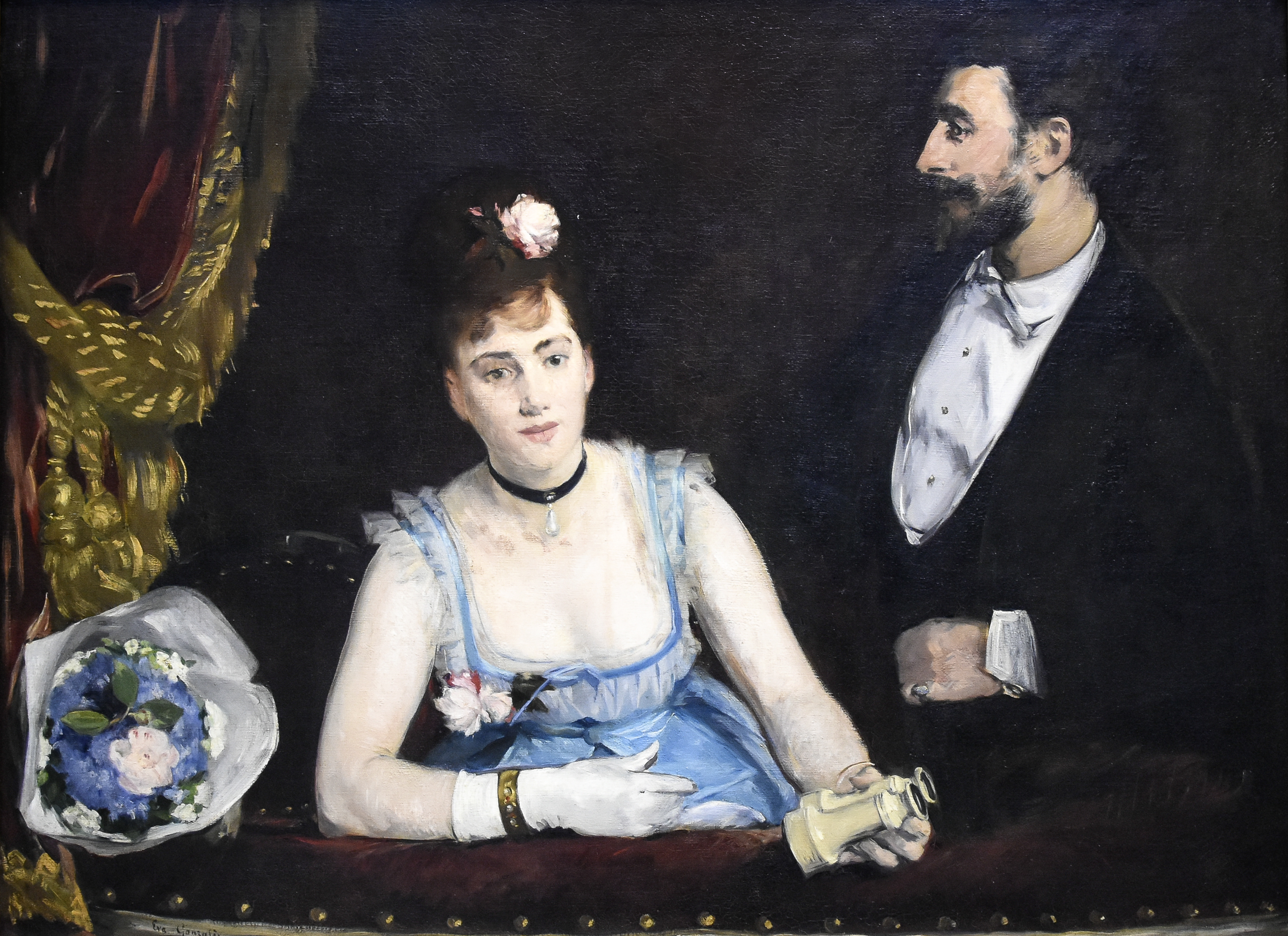
Eva Gonzalès – Box at the Italian Opera (Note: Title in French: Une Loge aux Italiens) (c. 1874), oil on canvas, Musée d'Orsay

Despite their success in their ability to have a career and Impressionism's demise attributed to its allegedly feminine characteristics—its sensuality, dependence on sensation, physicality, and fluidity—the four women artists, and other, lesser-known women Impressionists, were largely omitted from art historical textbooks covering Impressionist artists until Tamar Garb's Women Impressionists published in 1986. For example, Impressionism by Jean Leymarie, published in 1955 included no information on any women Impressionists.

Painter Androniqi Zengo Antoniu is co-credited with the introduction of impressionism to Albania.

== Prominent Impressionists ==
The central figures in the development of Impressionism in France, listed alphabetically, were:

- Frédéric Bazille (1841–1870), who only posthumously participated in the Impressionist exhibitions
- Gustave Caillebotte (1848–1894), who, younger than the others, joined forces with them in the mid-1870s
- Mary Cassatt (1844–1926), American-born, she lived in Paris and participated in four Impressionist exhibitions
- Paul Cézanne (1839–1906), although he later broke away from the Impressionists
- Edgar Degas (1834–1917), who despised the term Impressionist
- Armand Guillaumin (1841–1927)
- Édouard Manet (1832–1883), who did not participate in any of the Impressionist exhibitions
- Claude Monet (1840–1926), the most prolific and stereotypical of the Impressionists
- Berthe Morisot (1841–1895) who participated in all Impressionist exhibitions except in 1879
- Camille Pissarro (1830–1903), who was the only artist to participate in all eight Impressionist exhibitions
- Pierre-Auguste Renoir (1841–1919), who participated in Impressionist exhibitions in 1874, 1876, 1877 and 1882
- Alfred Sisley (1839–1899)

== Timeline: lives of the Impressionists ==
The Impressionists

== Gallery ==
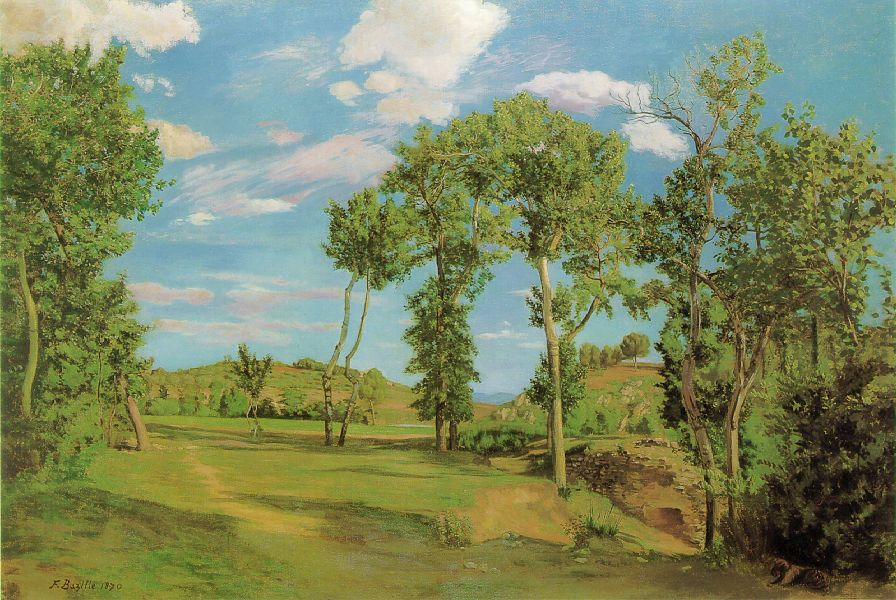
Frédéric Bazille – Paysage au bord du Lez (1870), Minneapolis Institute of Art

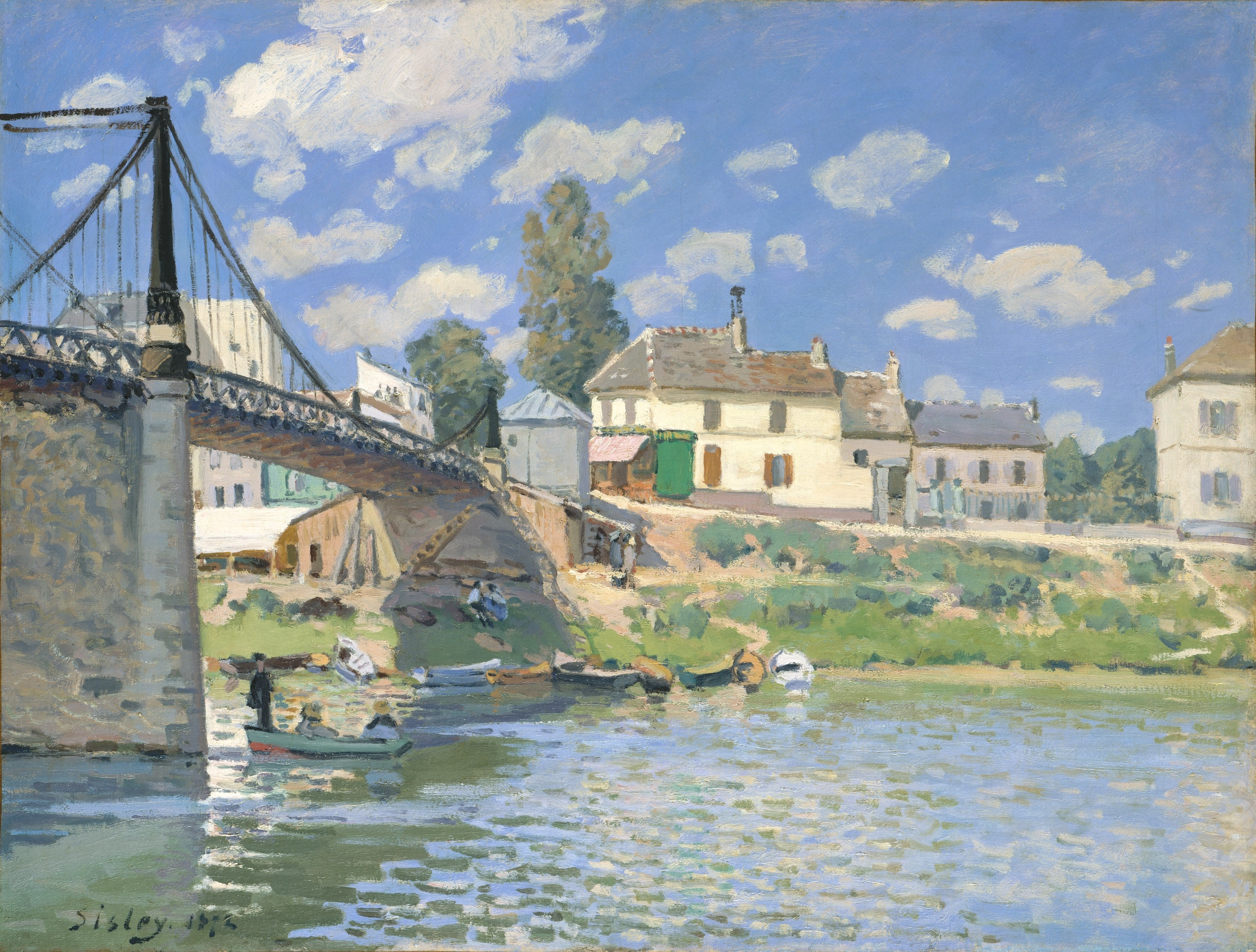
Alfred Sisley – Bridge at Villeneuve-la-Garenne (1872), Metropolitan Museum of Art

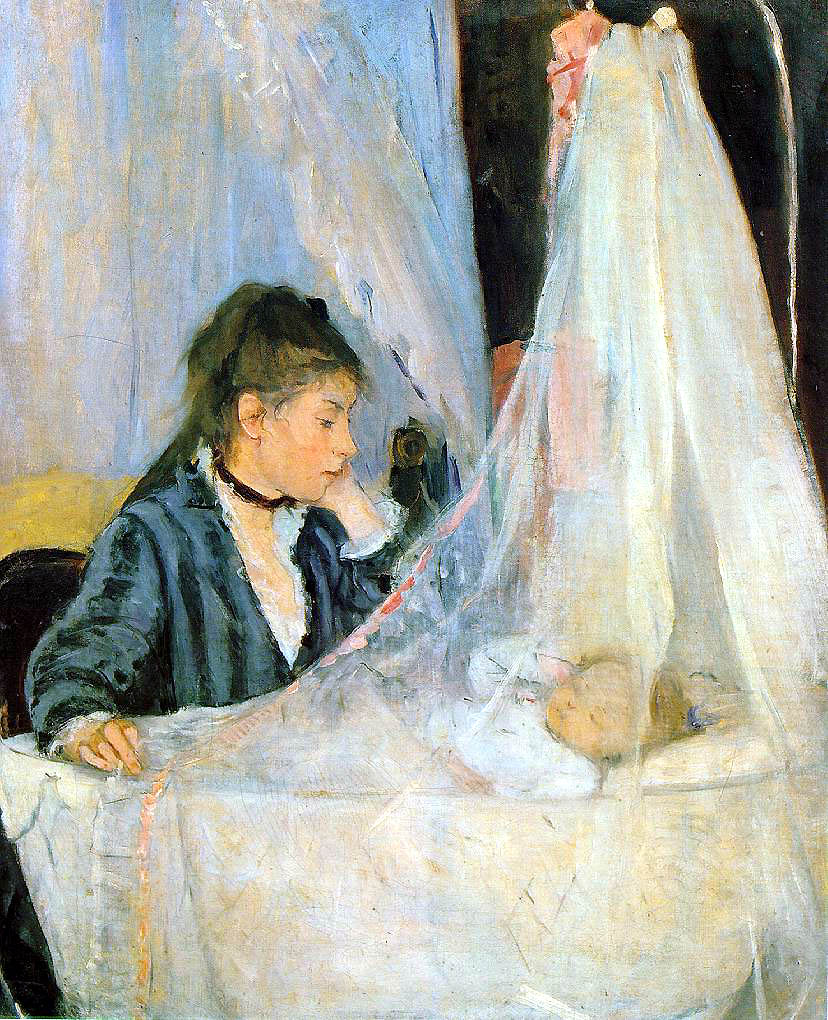
Berthe Morisot – The Cradle (1872), Musée d'Orsay

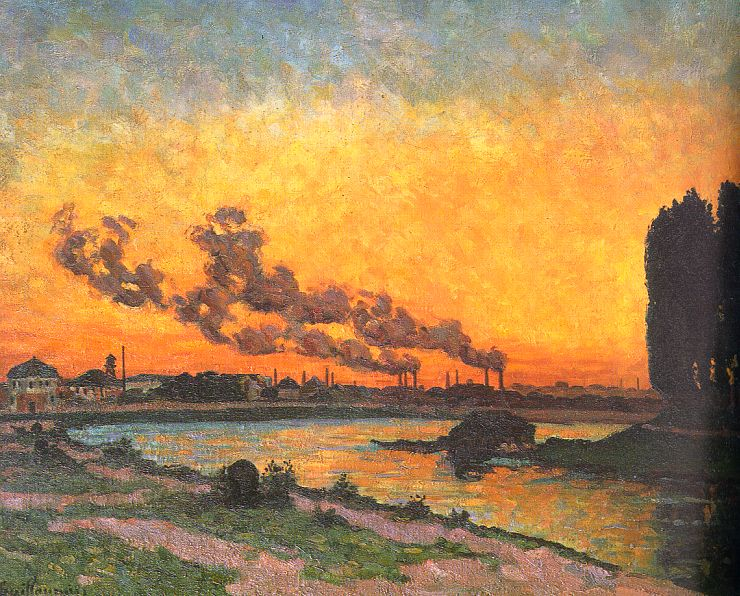
Armand Guillaumin – Sunset at Ivry (Note: Title in French: Soleil couchant à Ivry) (1873), Musée d'Orsay

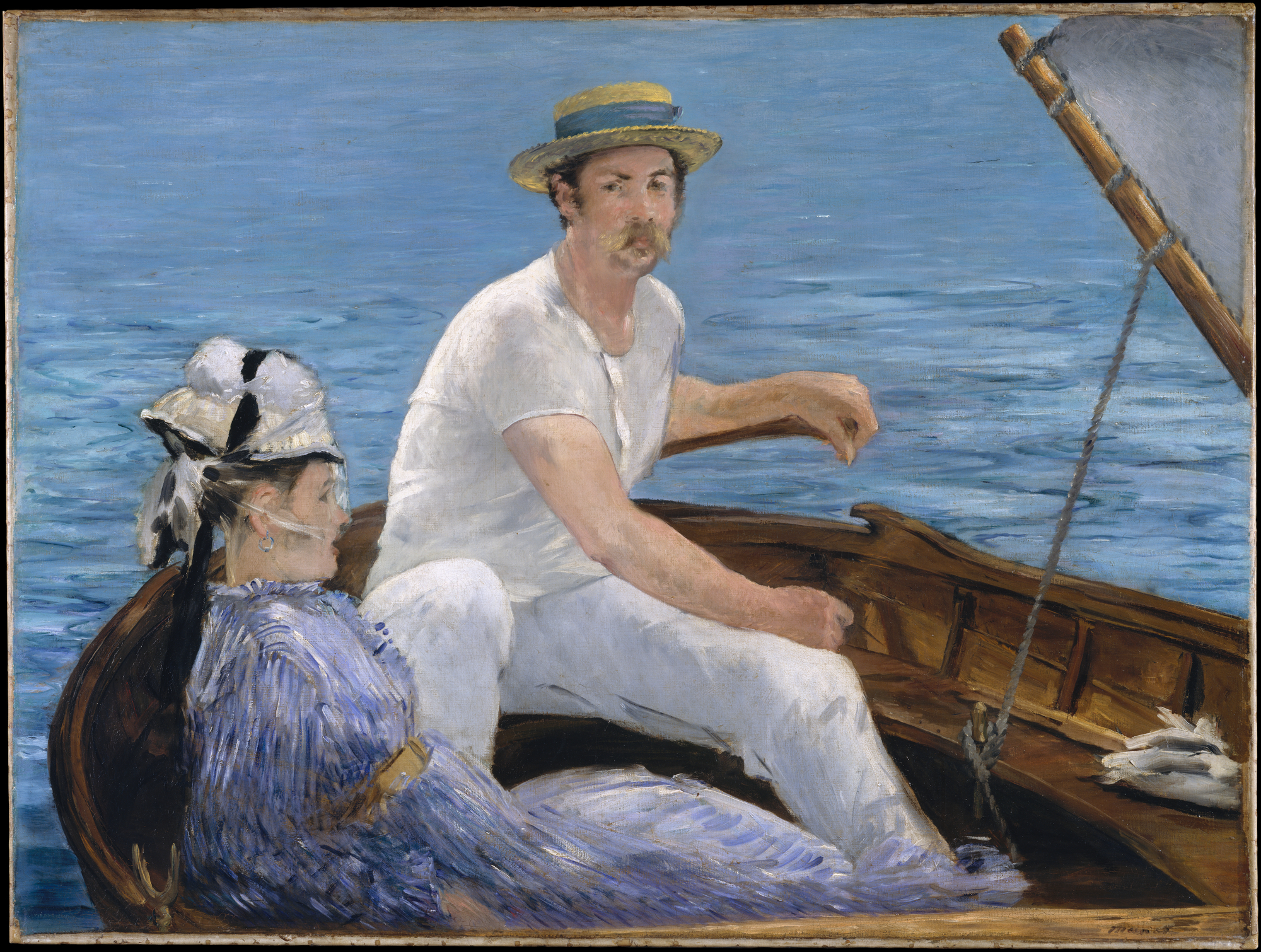
Édouard Manet – Boating (1874), Metropolitan Museum of Art

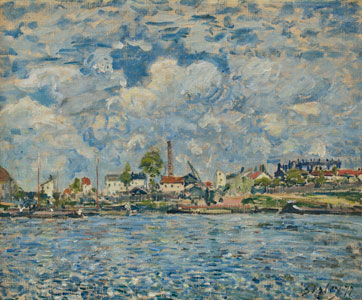
Alfred Sisley – La Seine au point du jour (1877), MuMa

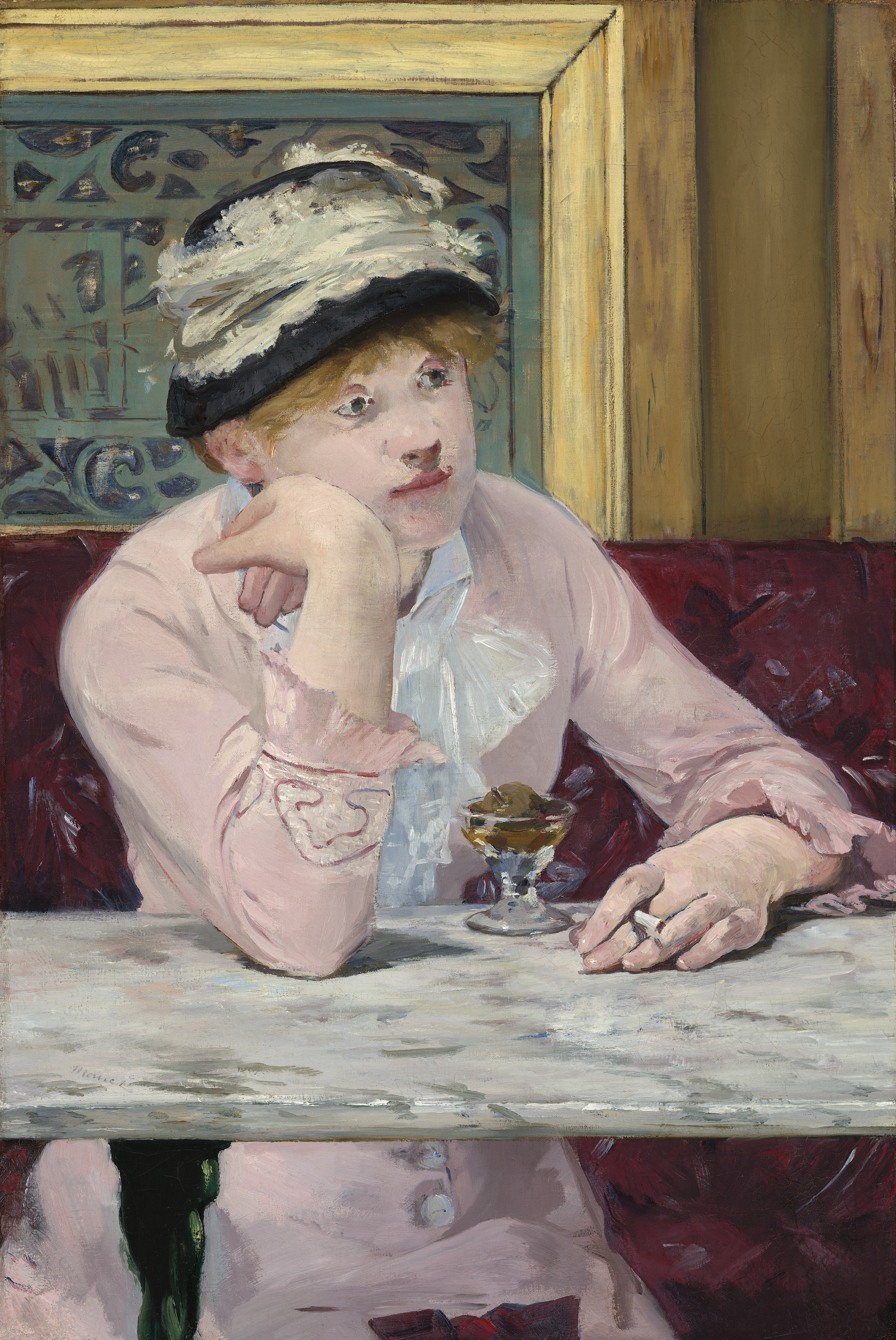
Édouard Manet – The Plum (1878), National Gallery of Art Washington

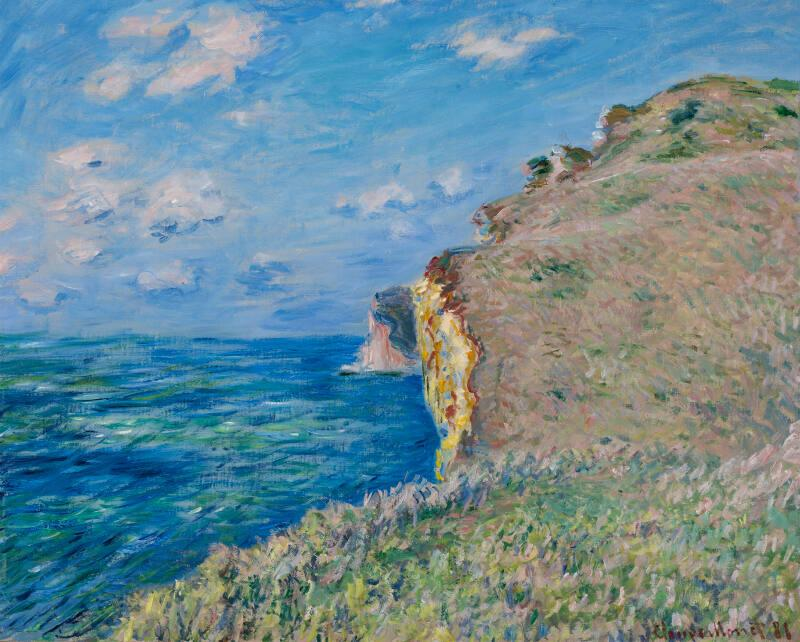
Claude Monet – La Falaise à Fécamp (1881), Aberdeen Art Gallery

Édouard Manet – A Bar at the Folies-Bergère 'Un Bar aux Folies-Bergère' (1882), Courtauld Institute of Art

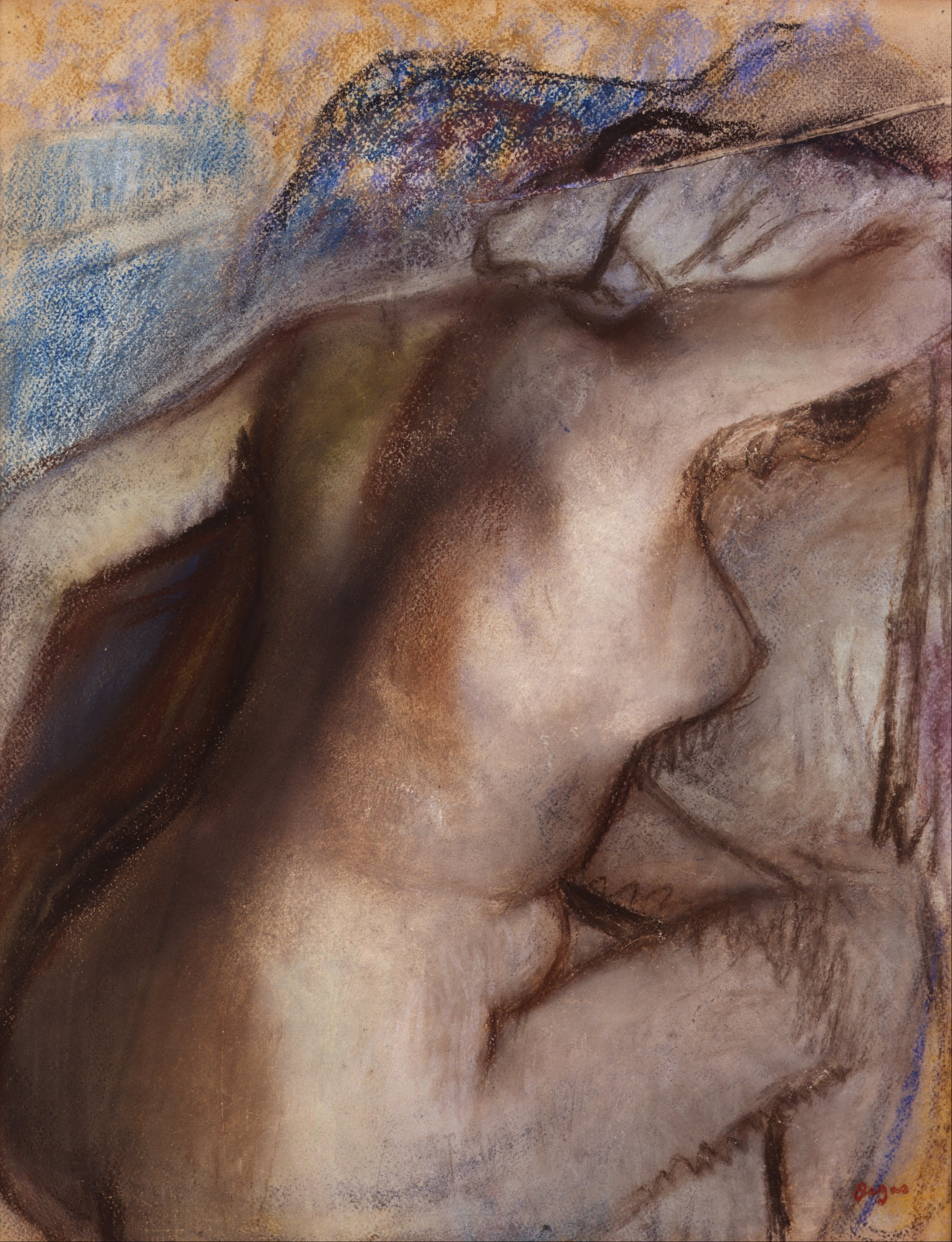
Edgar Degas – After the Bath, Woman Drying Herself (c. 1884–'86, reworked 1890–1900), MuMa

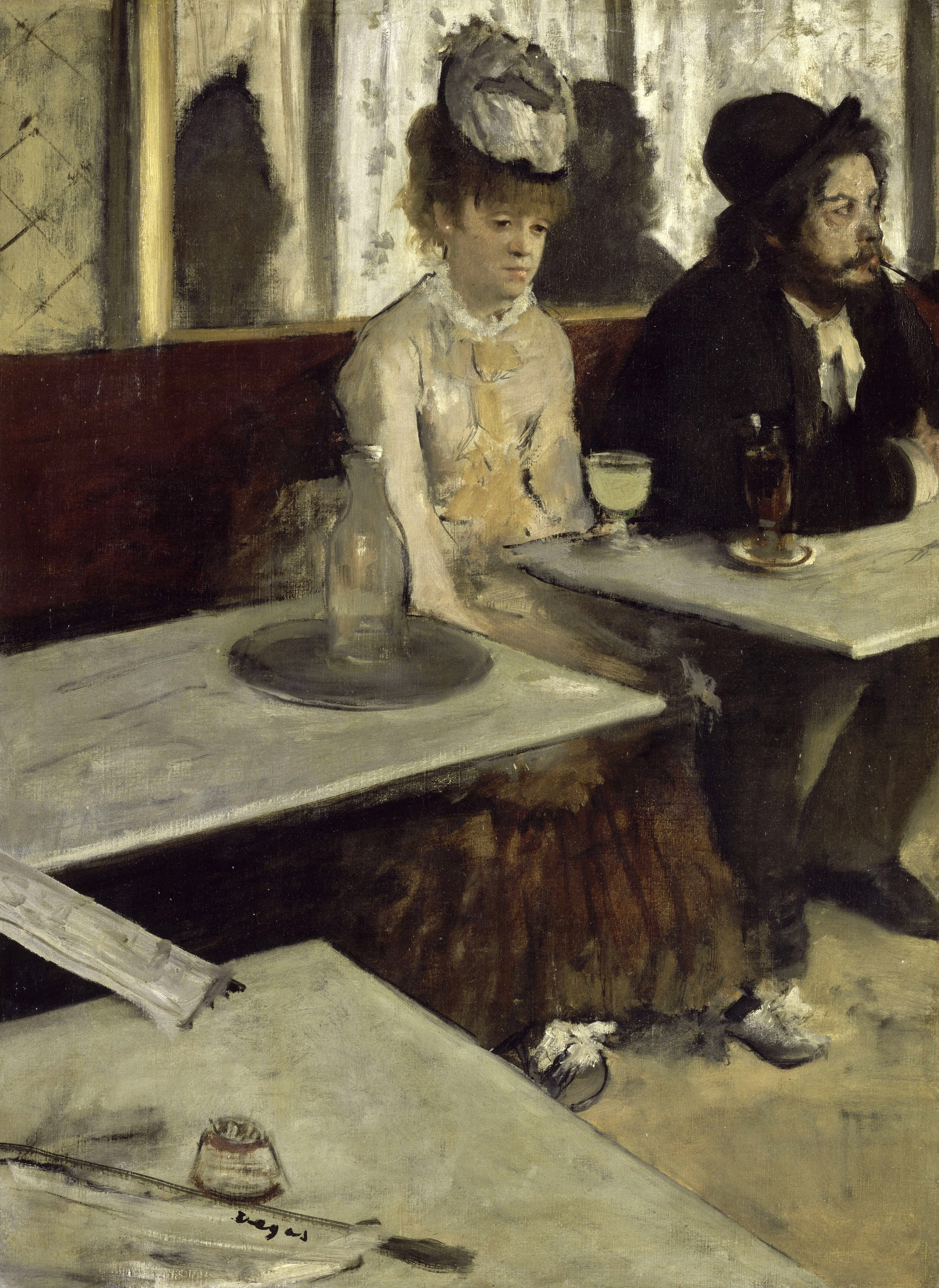
Edgar Degas – L'Absinthe (1876), Musée d'Orsay

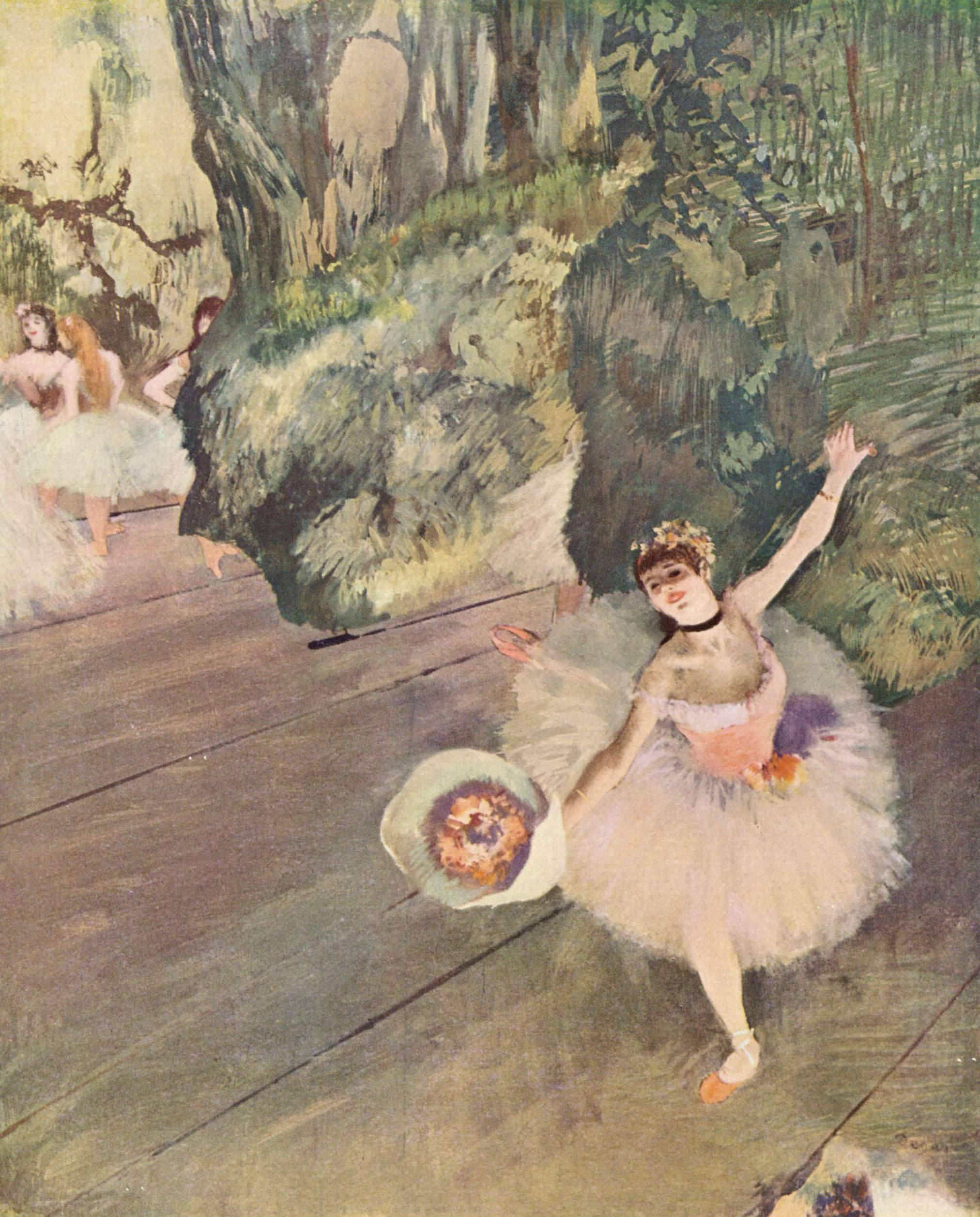
Edgar Degas – Dancer Taking a Bow (The Prima Ballerina) (1878), Getty Center

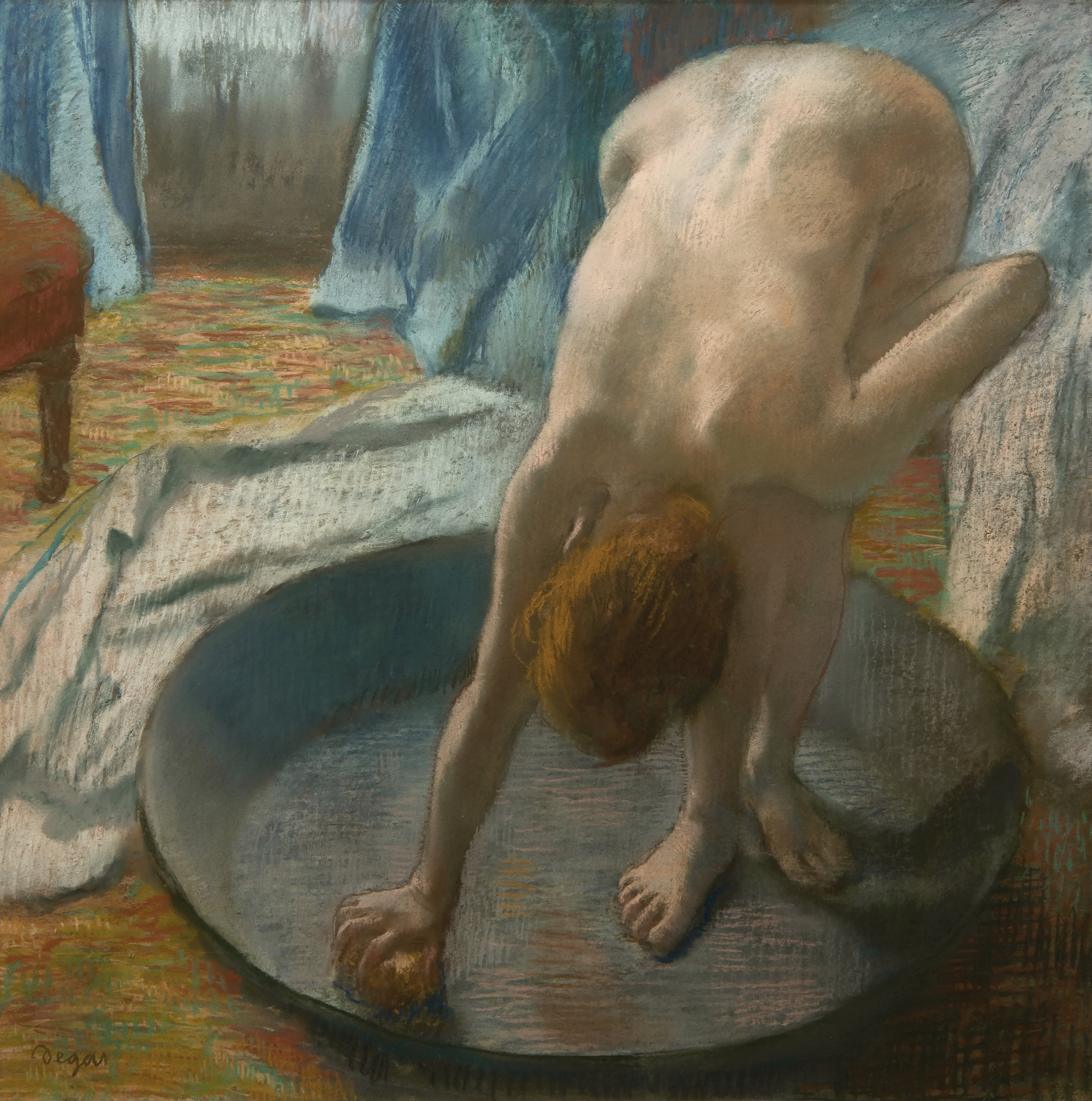
Edgar Degas – Woman in a Tub (1886), Hill–Stead Museum

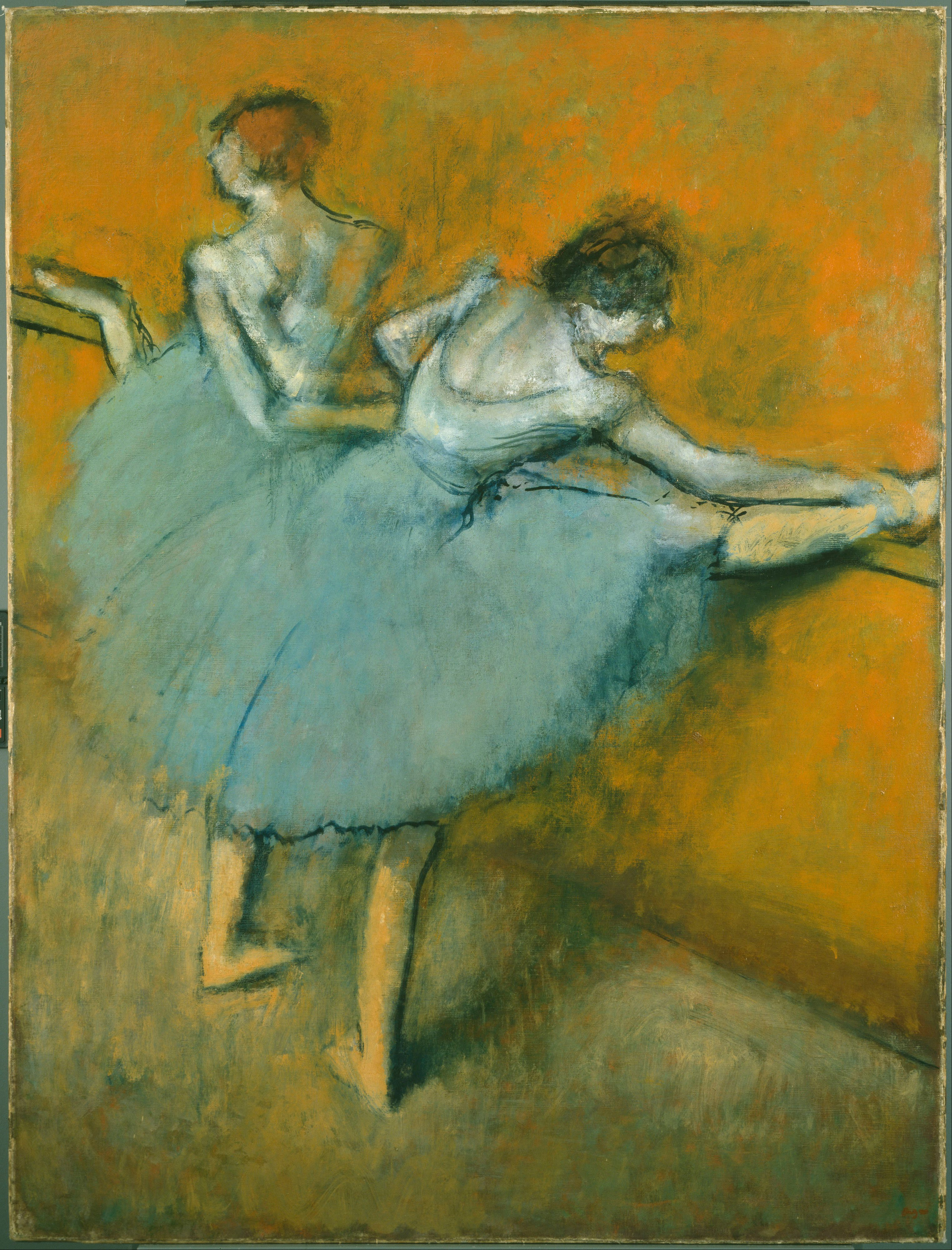
Edgar Degas – Dancers at The Bar (1888), The Phillips Collection

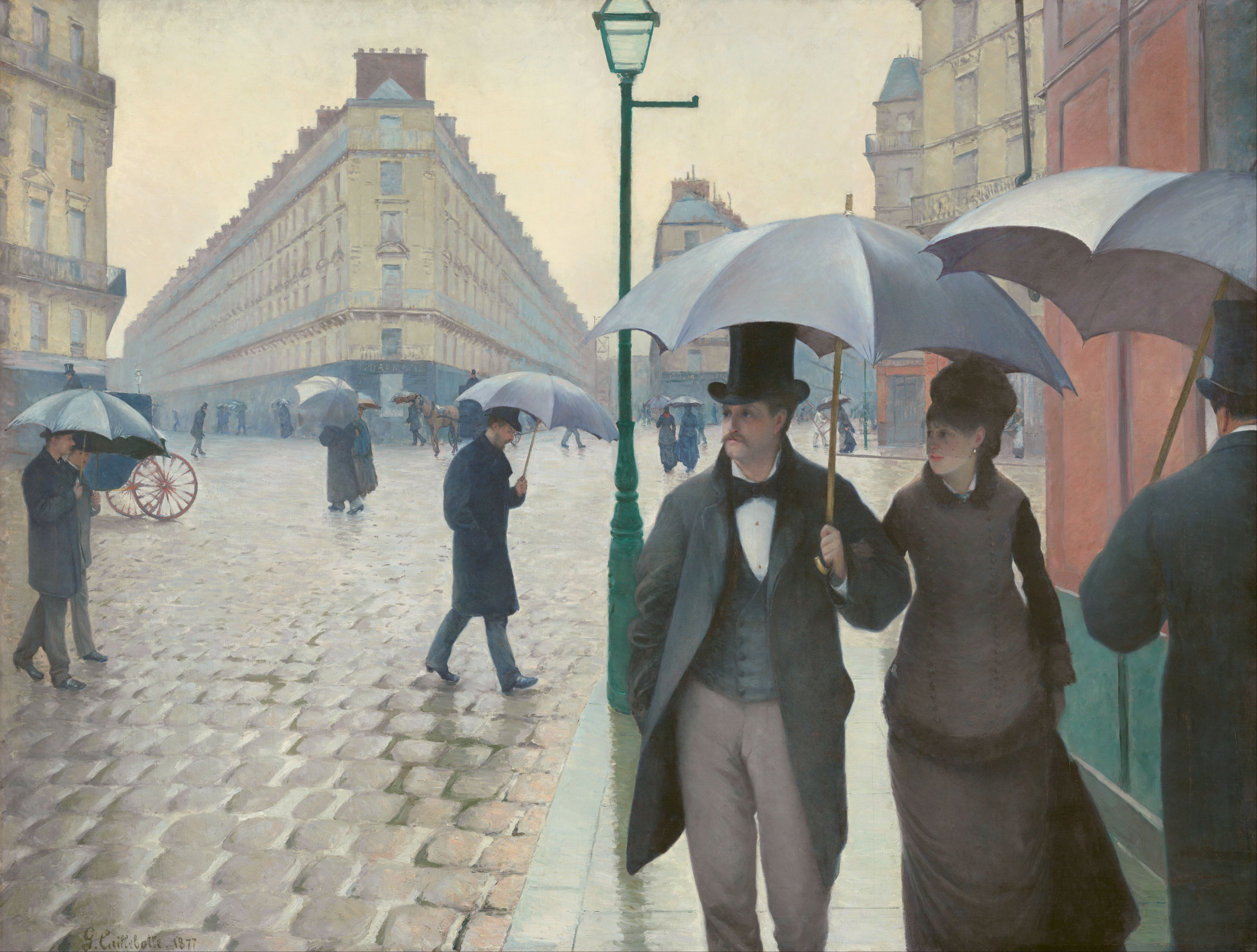
Gustave Caillebotte – Paris Street; Rainy Day (1877), Art Institute of Chicago

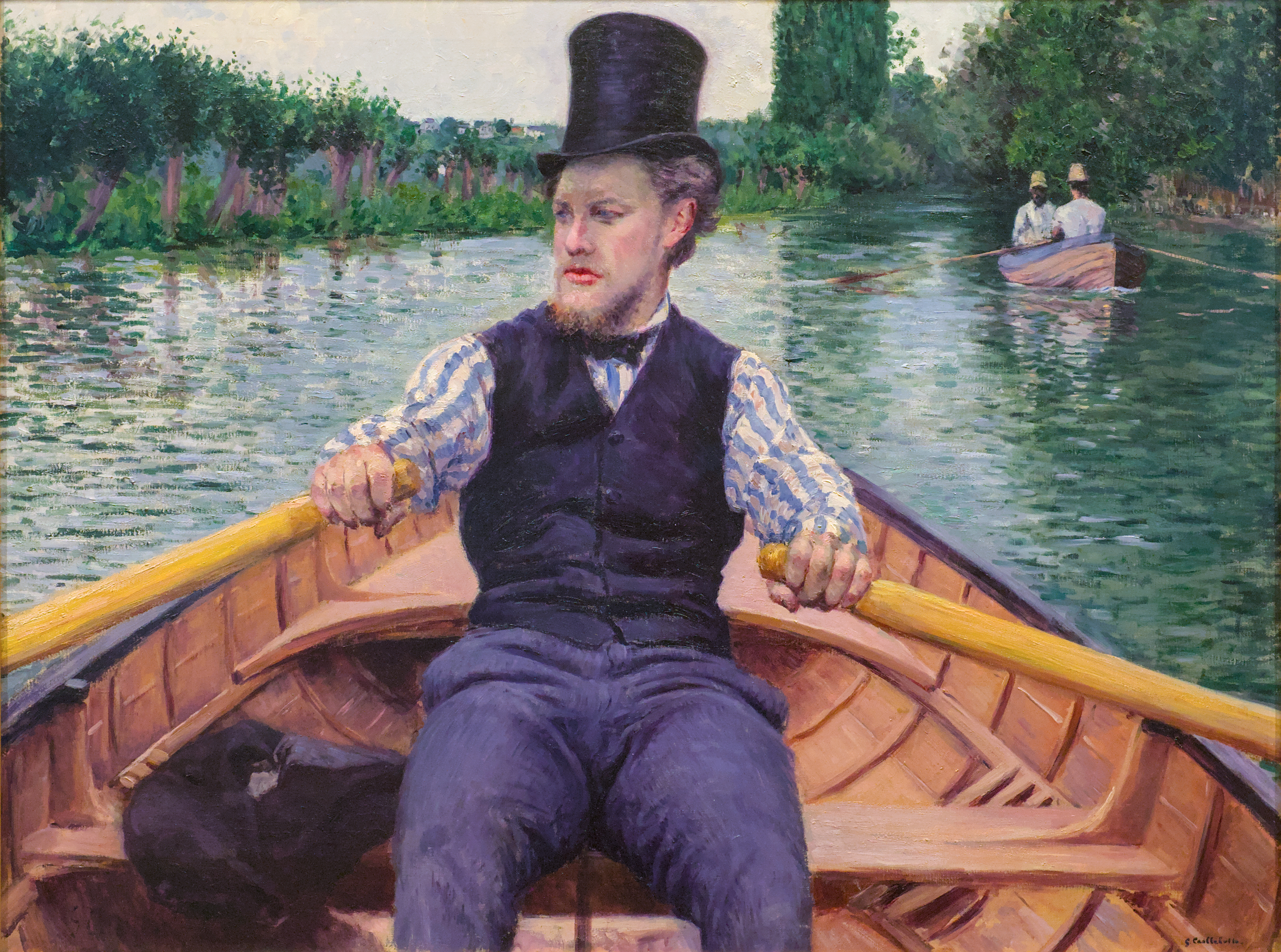
Gustave Caillebotte – Boating Party (1877–78), Musée d'Orsay

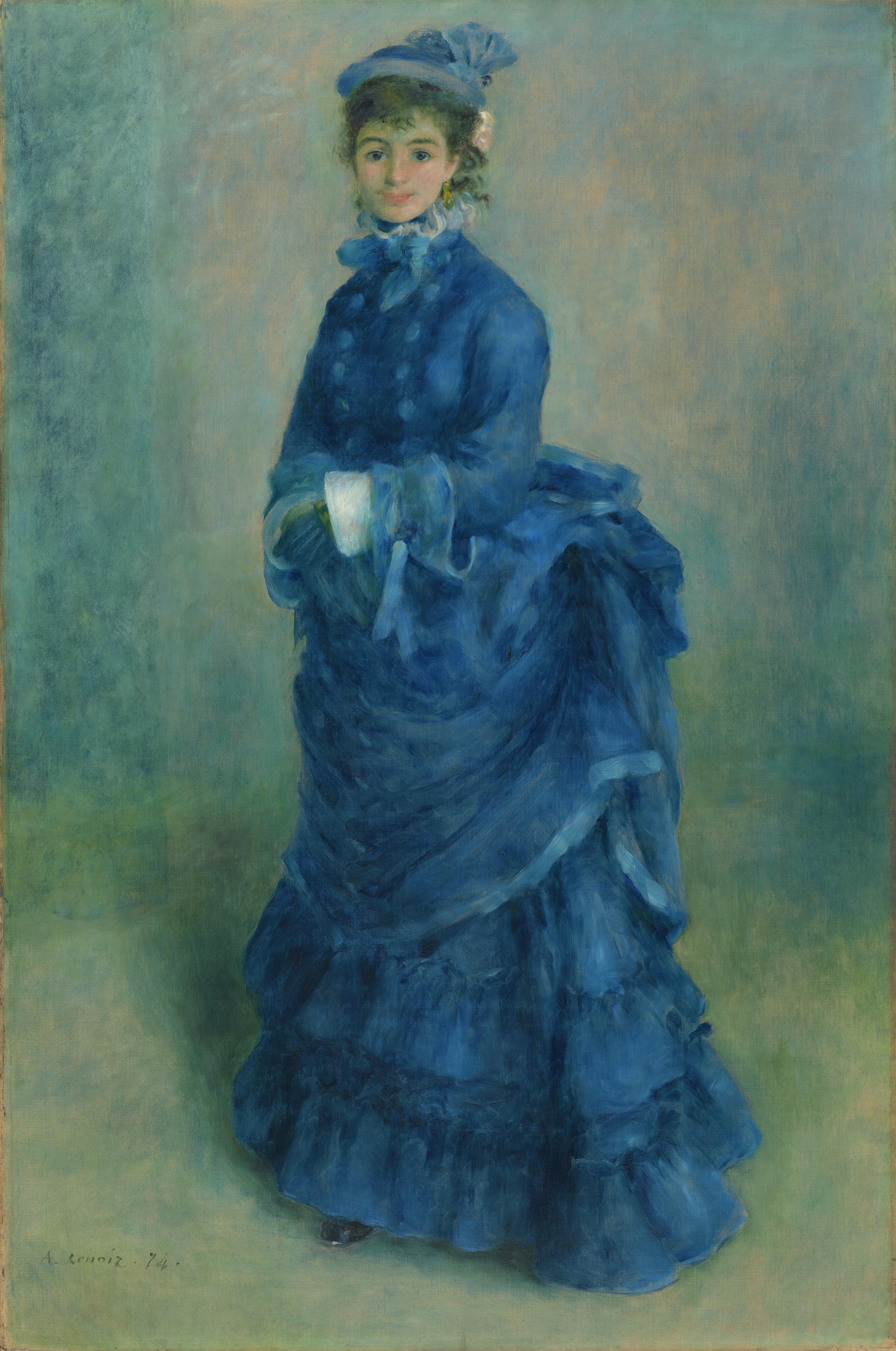
Pierre-Auguste Renoir – La Parisienne (1874), National Museum Cardiff

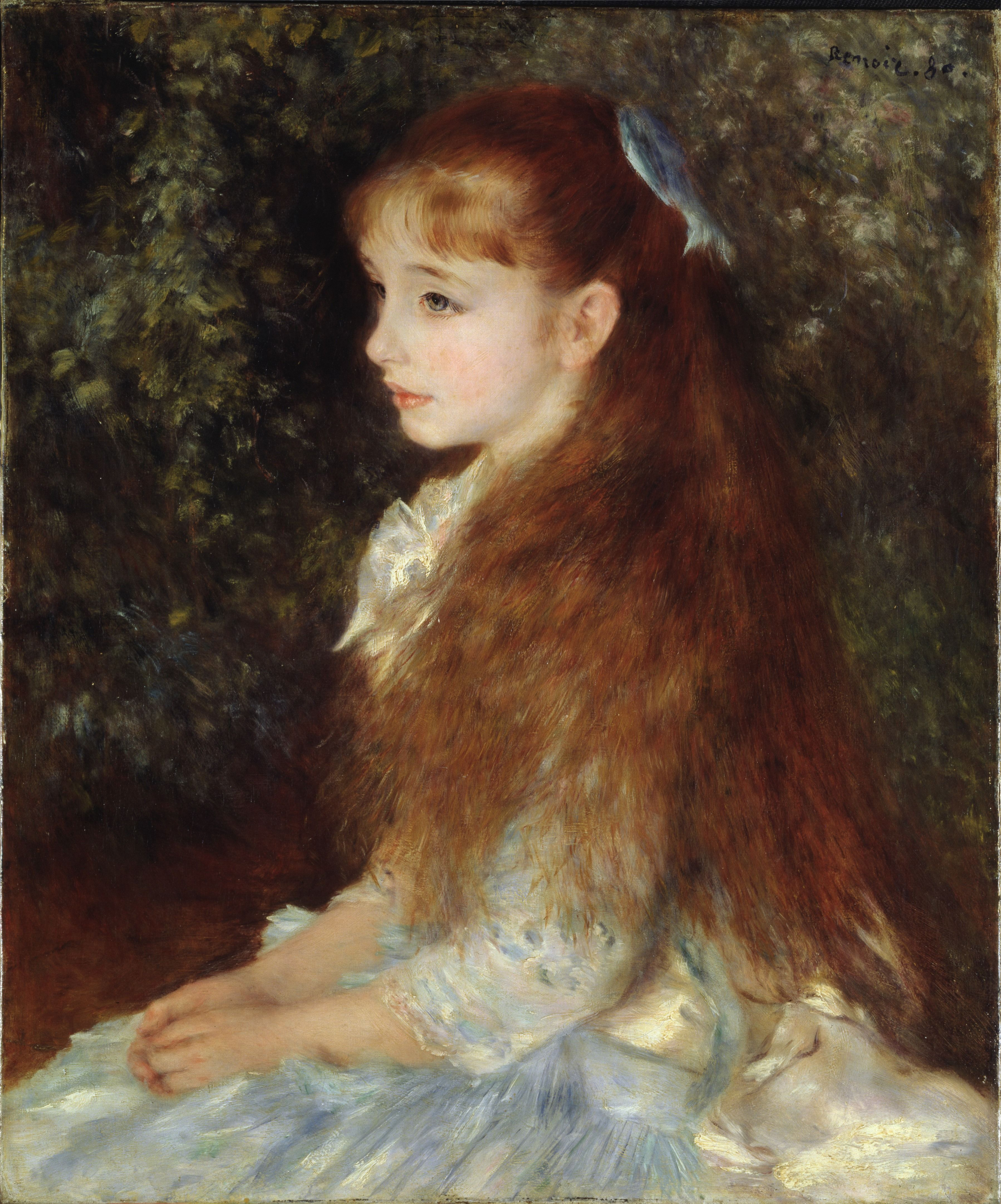
Pierre-Auguste Renoir – Portrait of Irène Cahen d'Anvers (1880), Foundation E. G. Bührle

Pierre-Auguste Renoir – Two Sisters (On the Terrace) (1881), Art Institute of Chicago

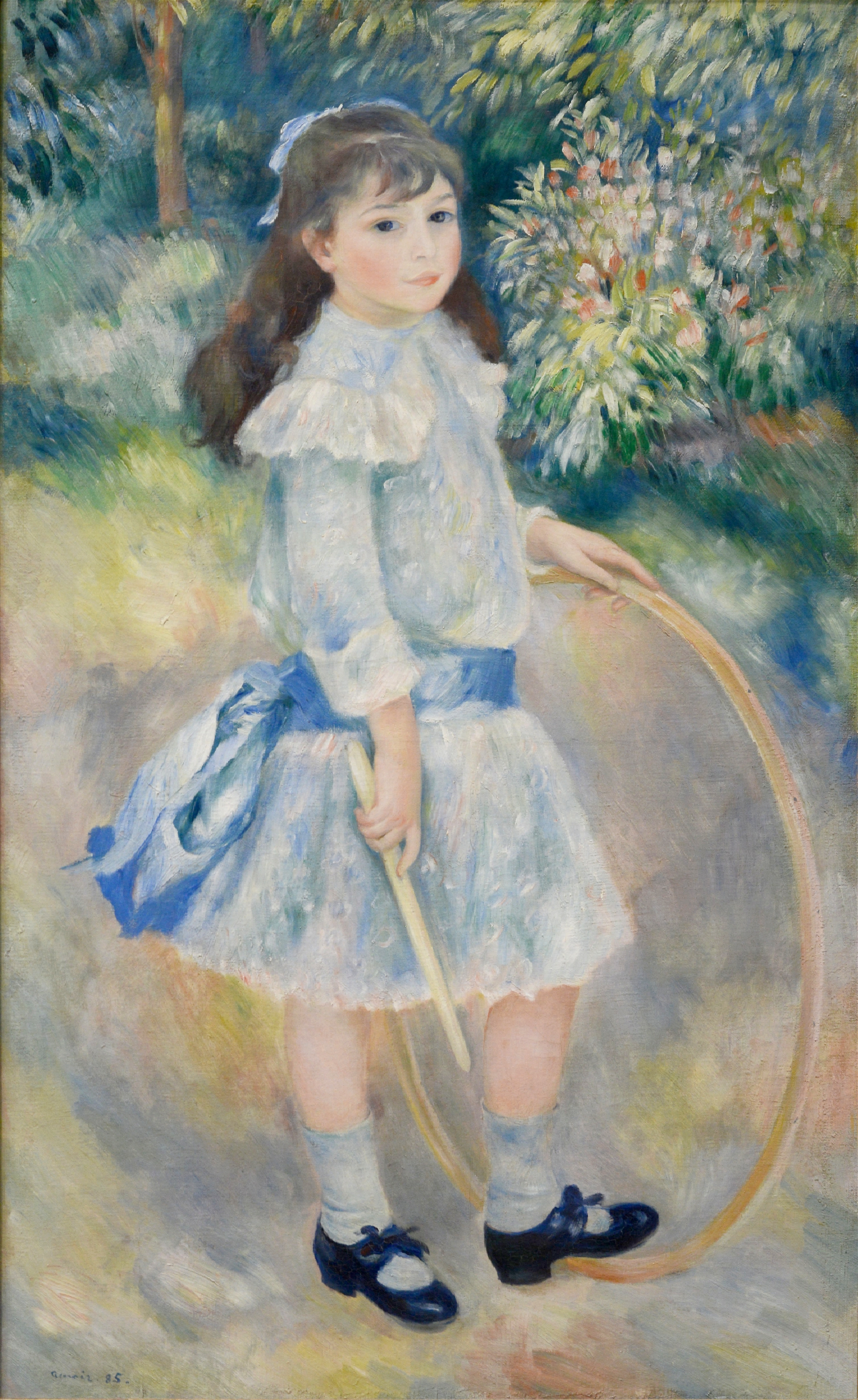
Pierre-Auguste Renoir – Girl with a Hoop (1885), National Gallery of Art Washington

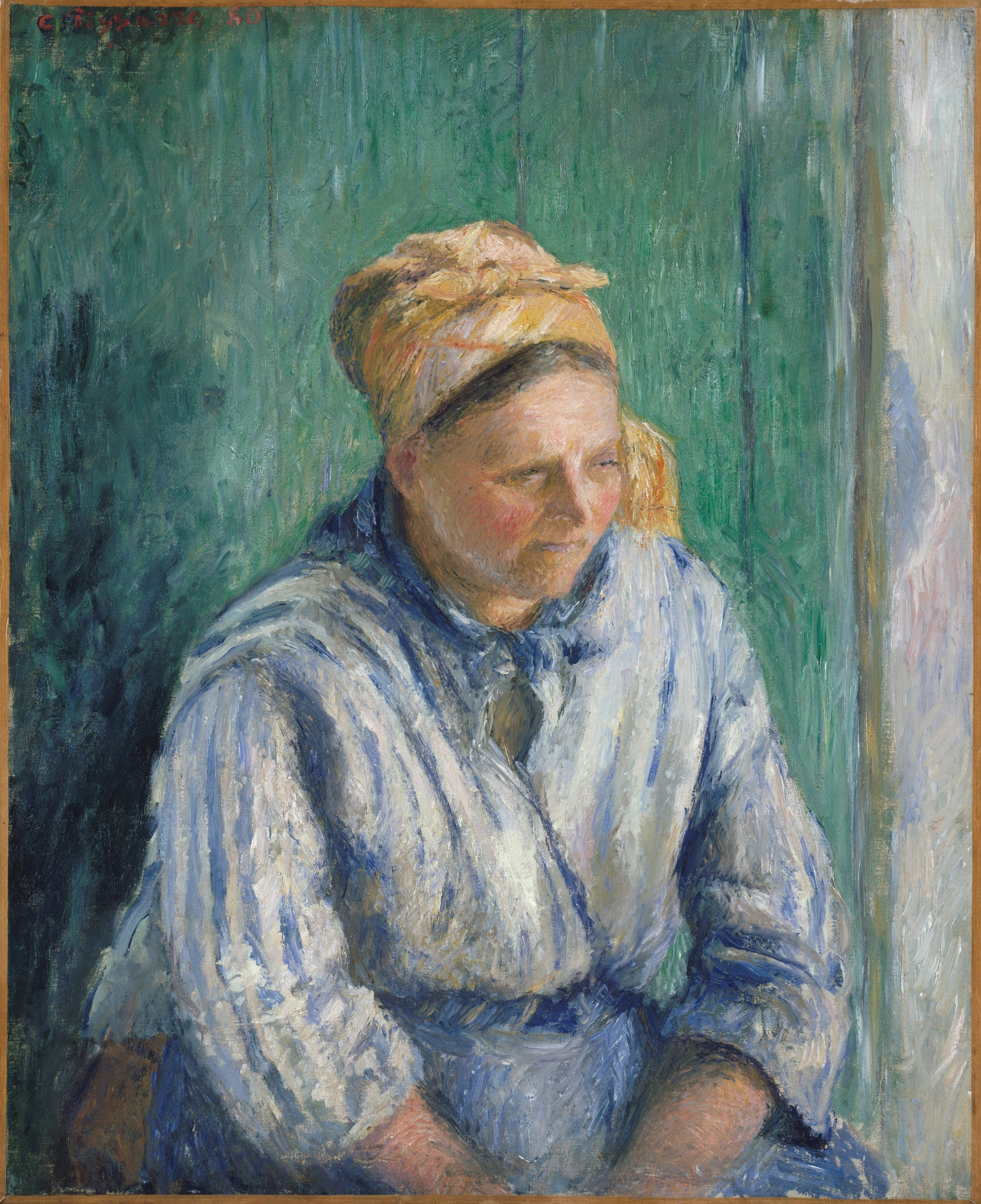
Camille Pissarro – Washerwoman, Study (1880), Metropolitan Museum of Art

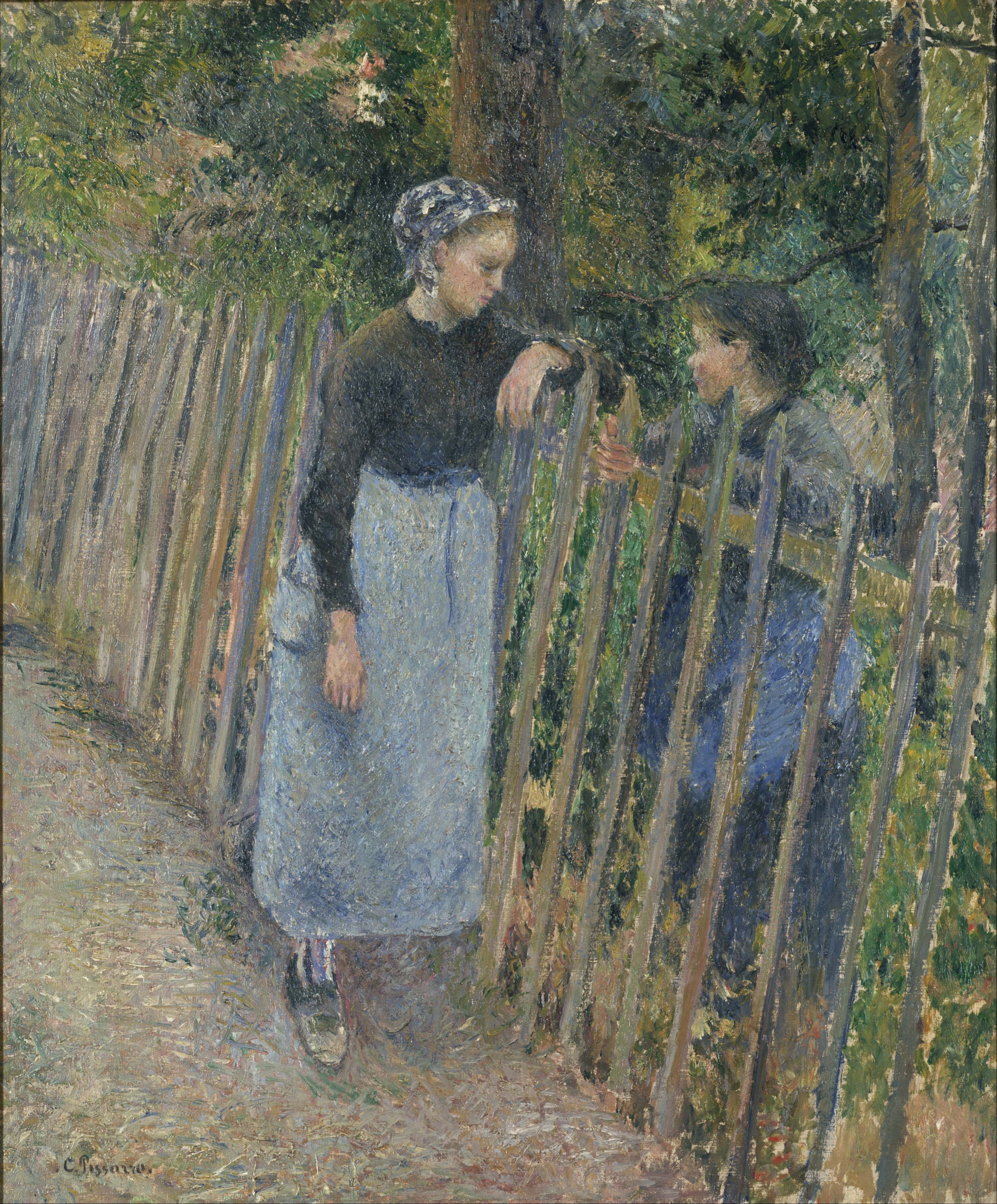
Camille Pissarro – Conversation (c. 1881), National Museum of Western Art

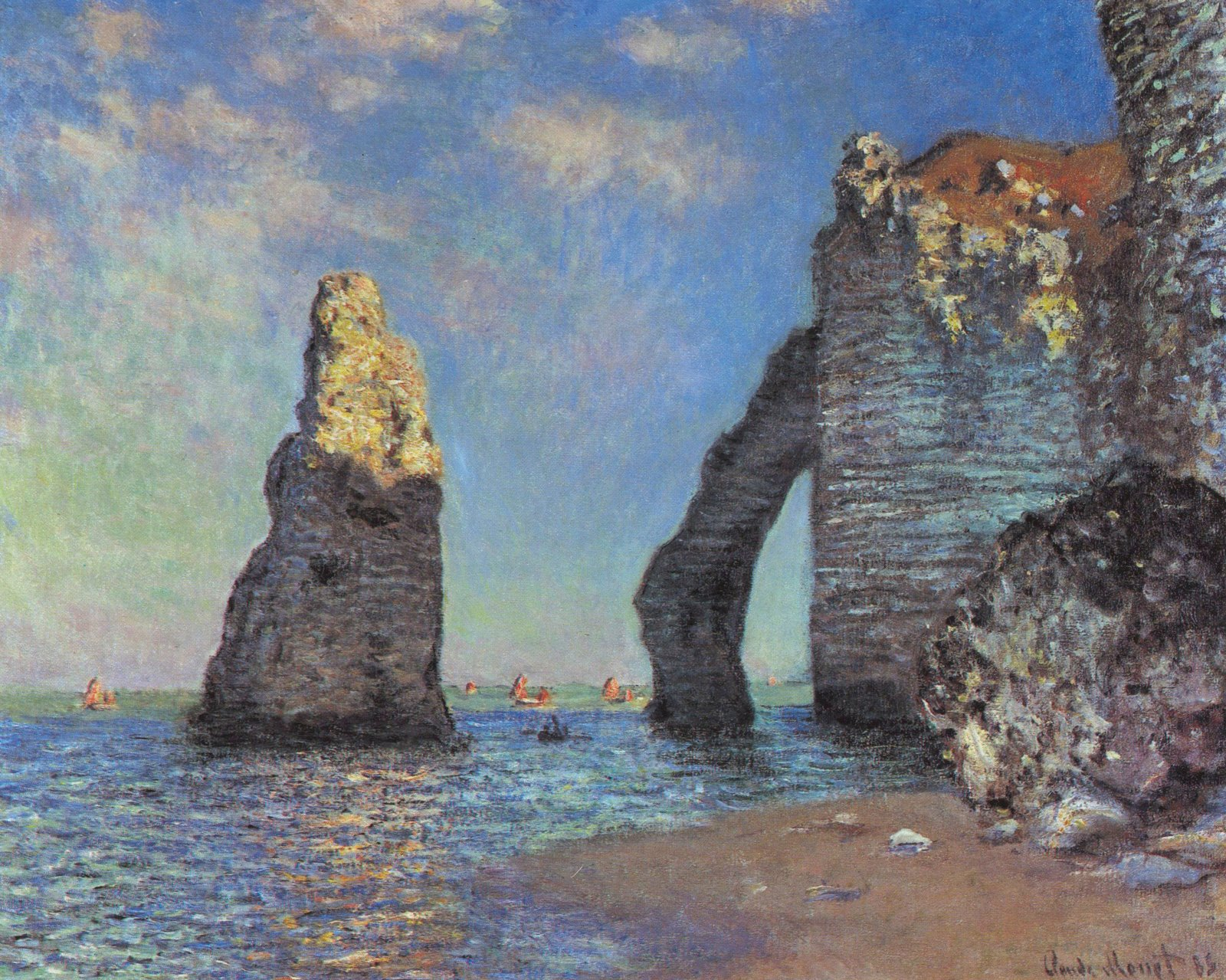
Claude Monet – The Cliff at Étretat after the Storm (1885), Clark Art Institute

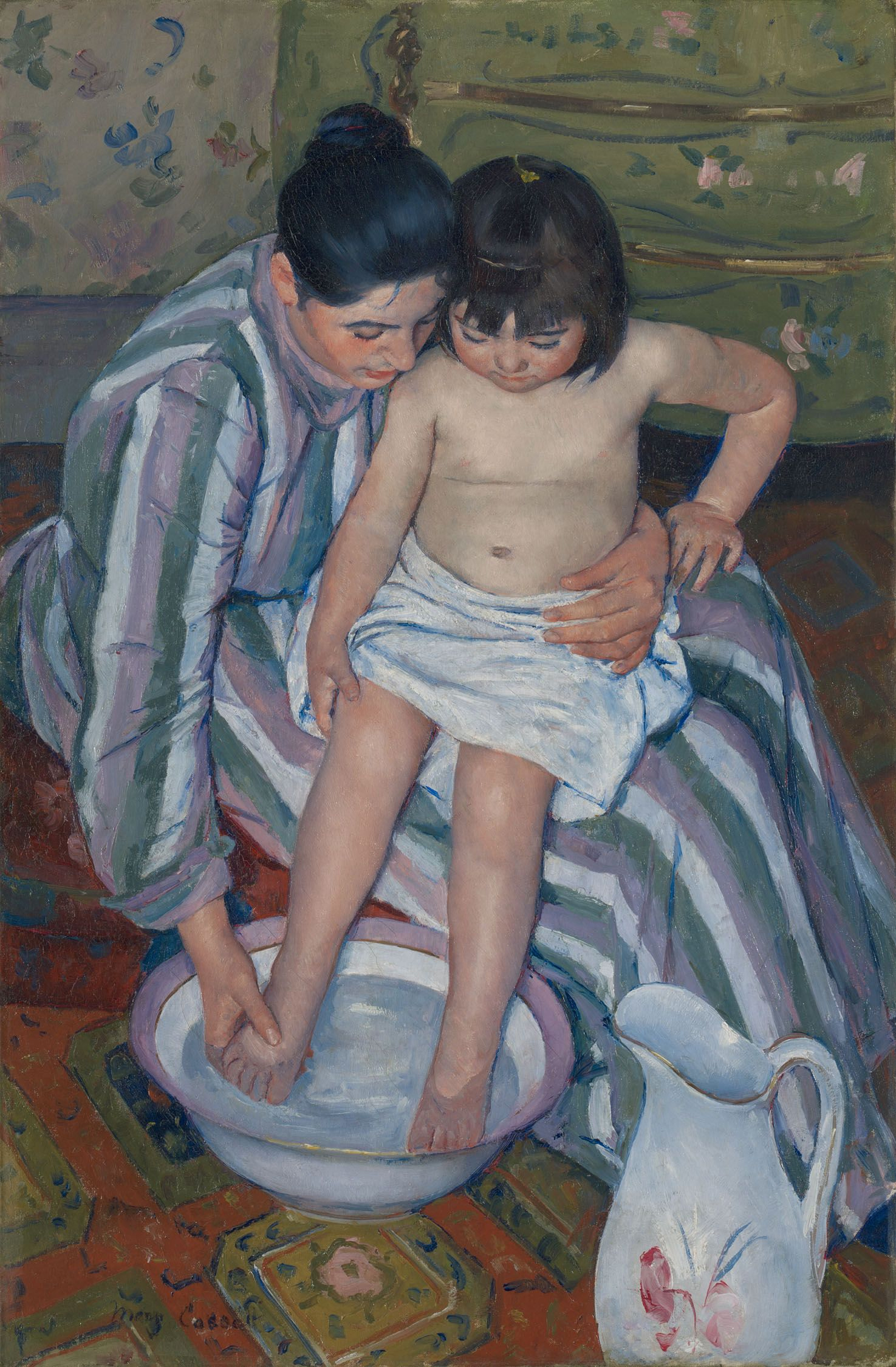
Mary Cassatt – The Child's Bath (1893), oil on canvas, Art Institute of Chicago

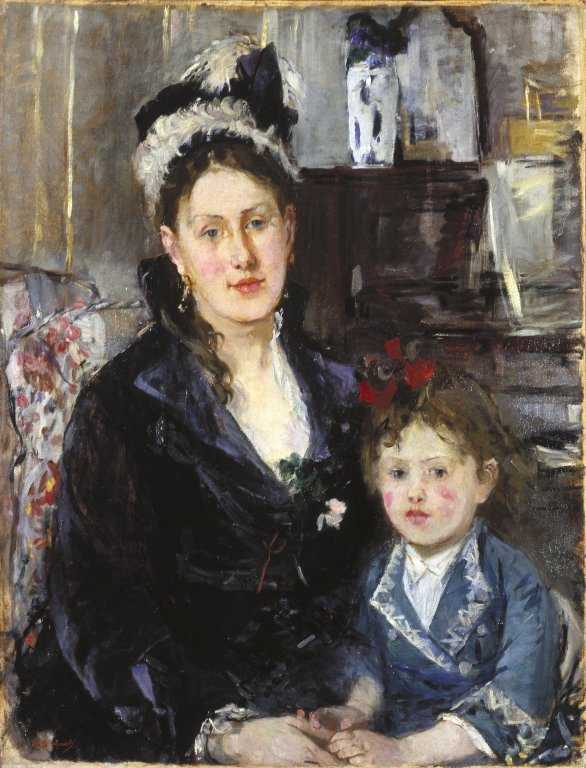
Berthe Morisot – Portrait of Mme Boursier and Her Daughter (c. 1873), Brooklyn Museum

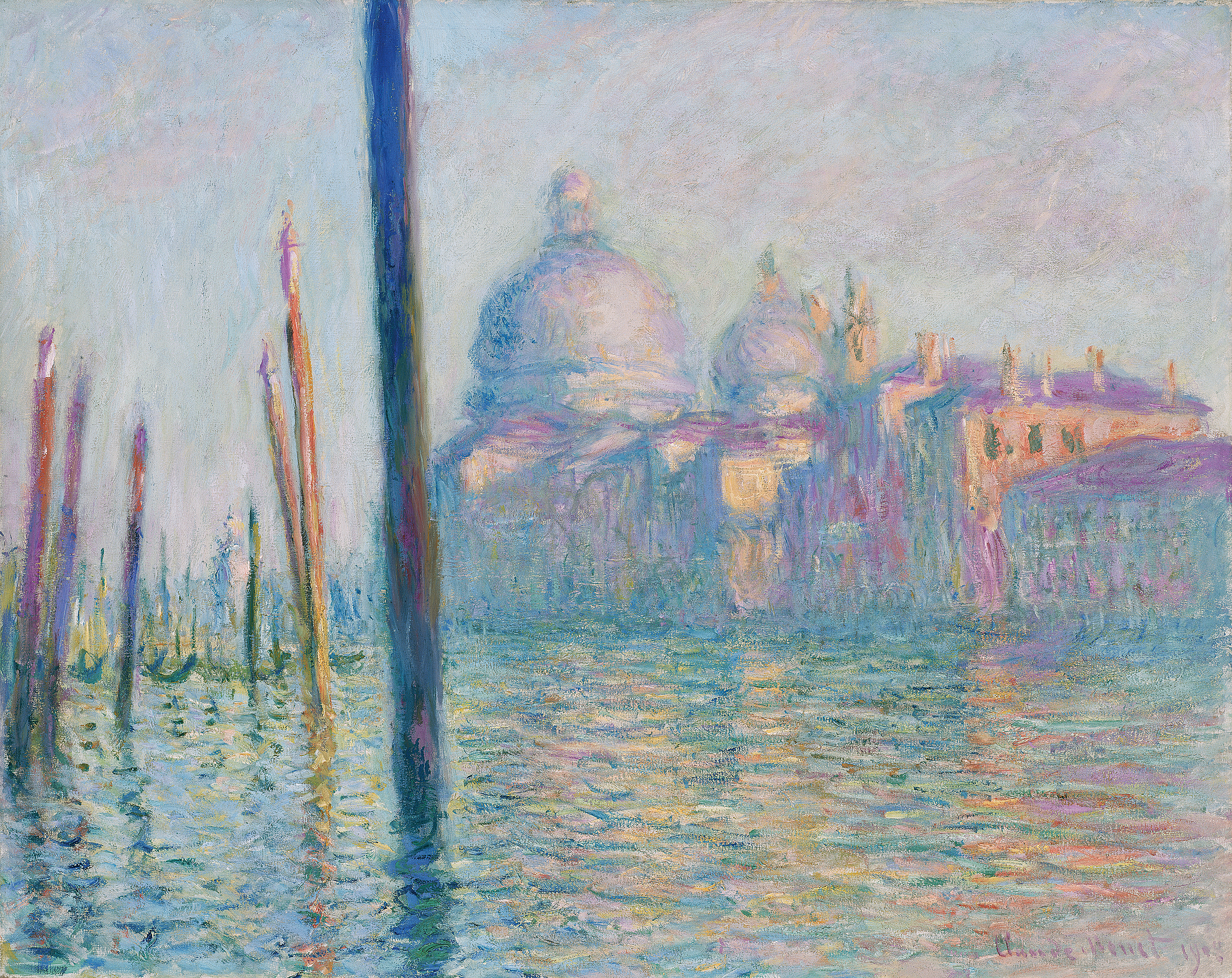
Claude Monet – Le Grand Canal (1908), Museum of Fine Arts Boston

Study for a portrait of Auguste Renoir, c. 1910, Musée de la Chartreuse de Douai.

== Associates and influenced artists ==
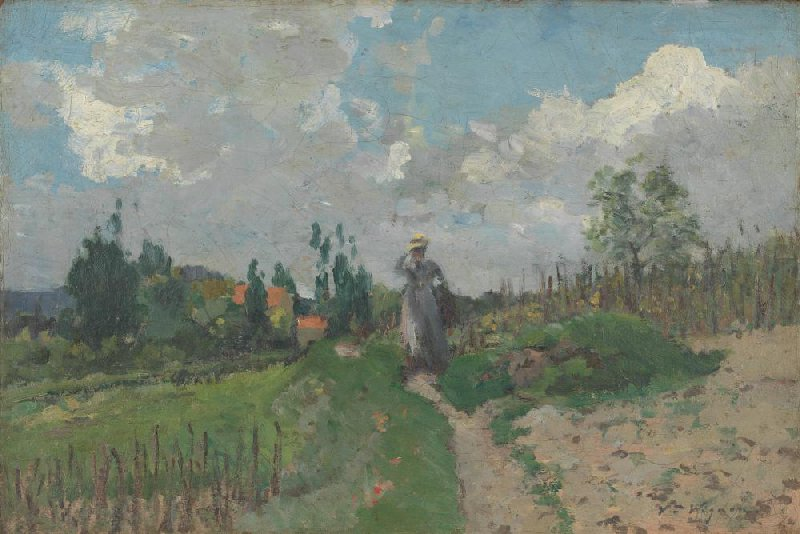
Victor Vignon – Woman in a Vineyard (c. 1880), Van Gogh Museum

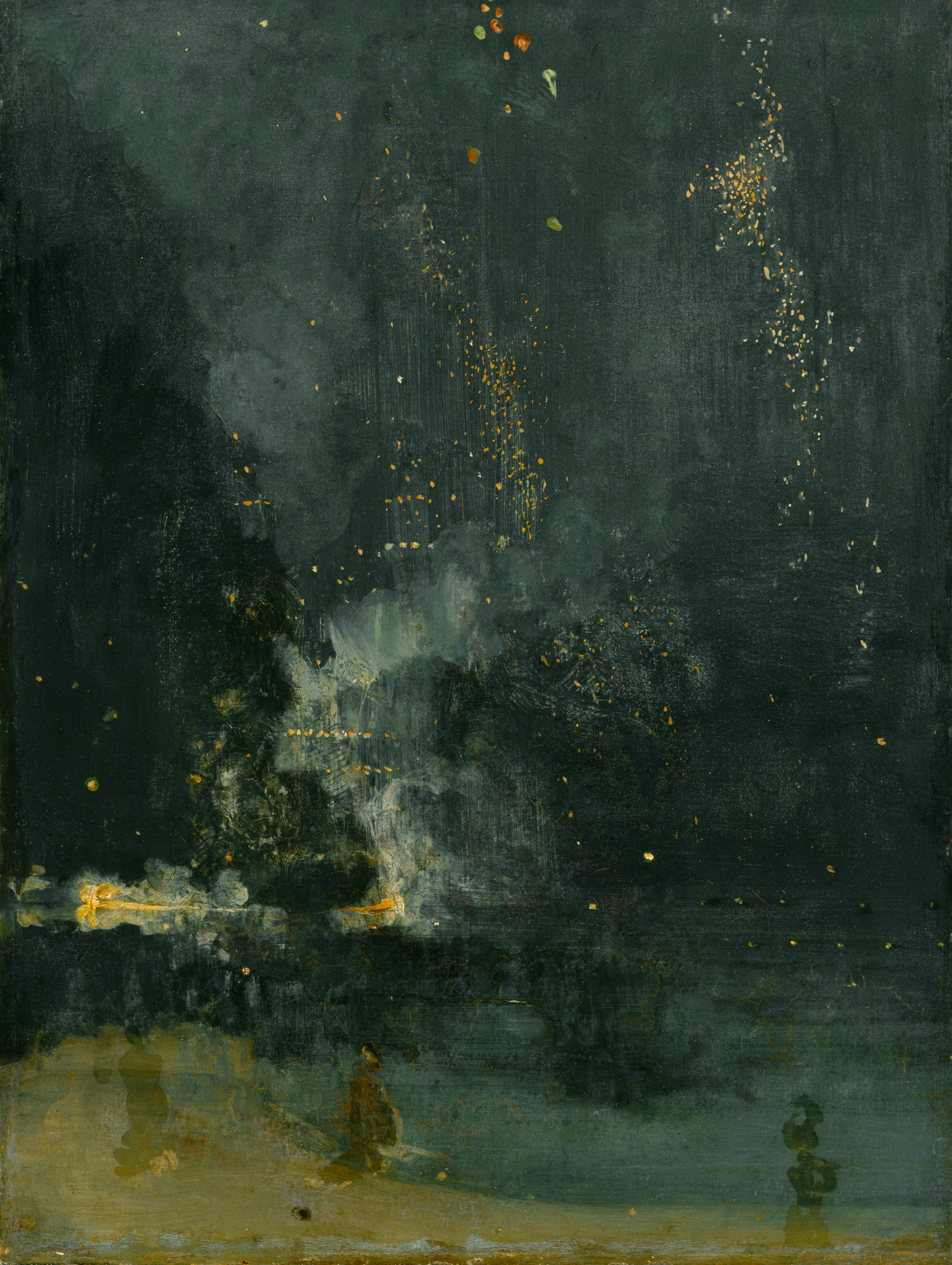
James Abbott McNeill Whistler – Nocturne in Black and Gold: The Falling Rocket (1874), Detroit Institute of Arts

Among the close associates of the Impressionists, Victor Vignon is the only artist outside the group of prominent names who participated to the most exclusive Seventh Paris Impressionist Exhibition in 1882, which was indeed a rejection to the previous less restricted exhibitions chiefly organised by Degas. Originally from the school of Corot, Vignon was a friend of Camille Pissarro, whose influence is evident in his impressionist style after the late 1870s, and a friend of post-impressionist Vincent van Gogh.

There were several other close associates of the Impressionists who adopted their methods to some degree. These include Jean-Louis Forain, who participated in Impressionist exhibitions in 1879, 1880, 1881 and 1886, and Giuseppe De Nittis, an Italian artist living in Paris who participated in the first Impressionist exhibit at the invitation of Degas, although the other Impressionists disparaged his work. Federico Zandomeneghi was another Italian friend of Degas who showed with the Impressionists. Eva Gonzalès was a follower of Manet who did not exhibit with the group.

James Abbott McNeill Whistler was an American-born painter who played a part in Impressionism although he did not join the group and preferred grayed colours. Walter Sickert, an English artist, was initially a follower of Whistler, and later an important disciple of Degas. He did not exhibit with the Impressionists. In 1904, the artist and writer Wynford Dewhurst wrote the first important study of the French painters published in English, Impressionist Painting: its genesis and development, which did much to popularise Impressionism in Great Britain.

By the early 1880s, Impressionist methods were affecting, at least superficially, the art of the Salon. Fashionable painters, such as Jean Béraud and Henri Gervex, found critical and financial success by brightening their palettes while retaining the smooth finish expected of Salon art. Works by these artists are sometimes casually referred to as Impressionism, despite their remoteness from Impressionist practice.

The influence of the French Impressionists lasted long after most of them had died. Artists like J.D. Kirszenbaum were borrowing Impressionist techniques throughout the twentieth century.

== Beyond France ==
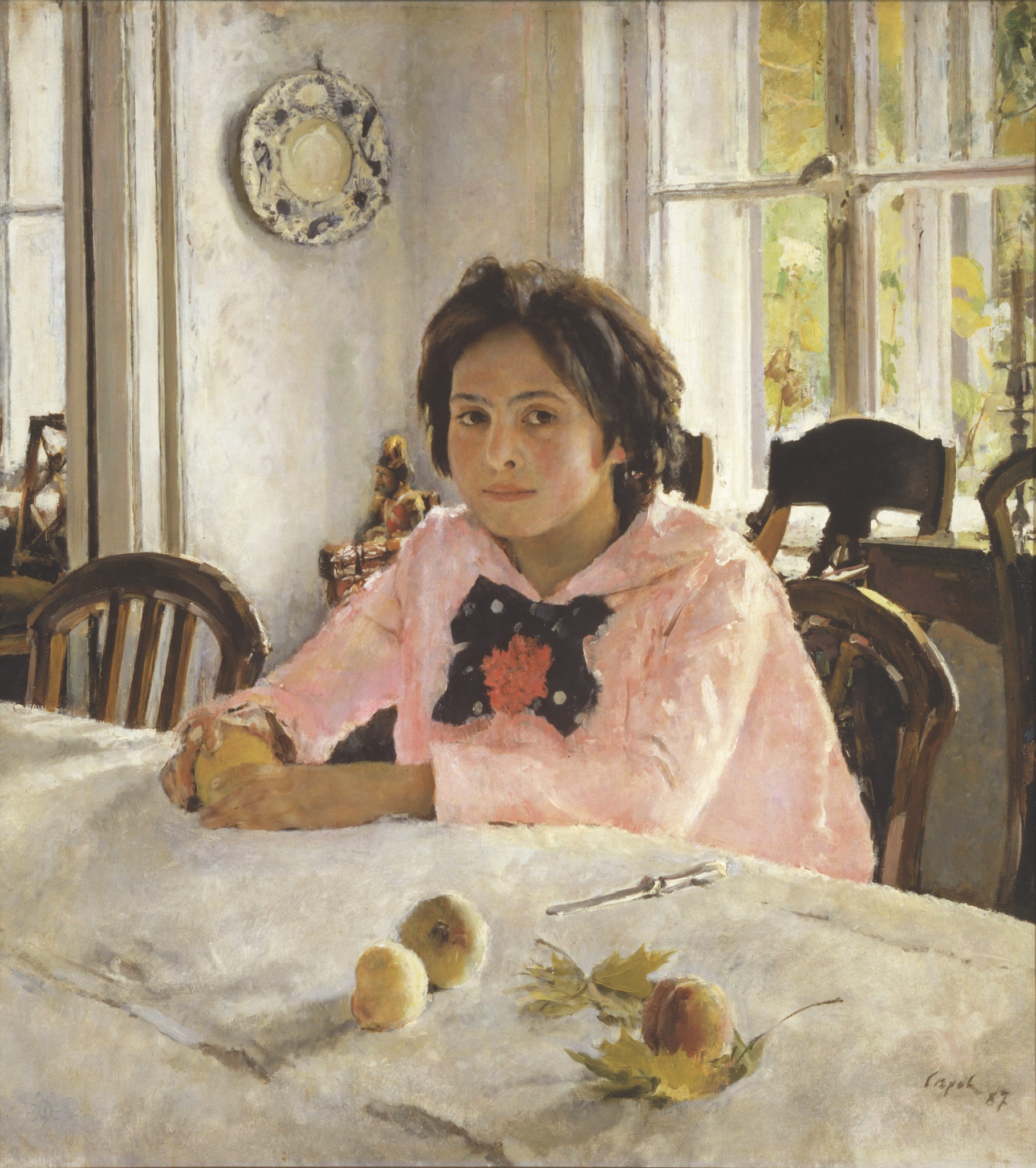
Valentin Serov – Girl with Peaches (1887) Tretyakov Gallery

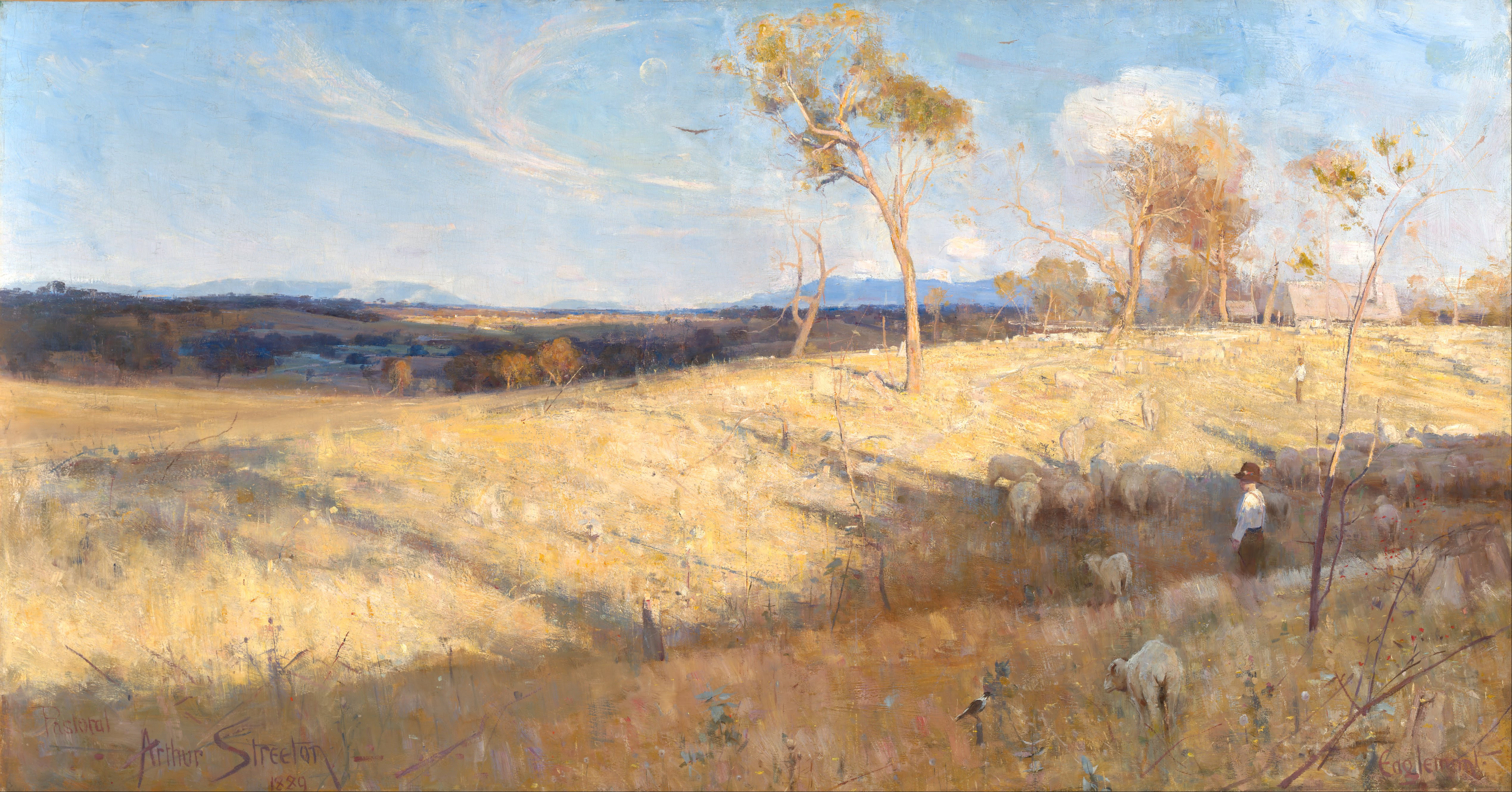
Arthur Streeton – Golden Summer, Eaglemont (1889), National Gallery of Australia. An example of Australian impressionism.

Peder Severin Krøyer – Hip, Hip, Hurrah! (1888), Gothenburg Museum of Art. Shows members of the Skagen Painters.

As the influence of Impressionism spread beyond France, artists, too numerous to list, became identified as practitioners of the new style. Some of the more important examples are:

- The American Impressionists, including Mary Cassatt, William Merritt Chase, Frederick Carl Frieseke, Childe Hassam, Willard Metcalf, Lilla Cabot Perry, Theodore Robinson, Edmund Charles Tarbell, John Henry Twachtman, Catherine Wiley, and J. Alden Weir in the United States
  - The California Impressionists, including William Wendt, Guy Rose, Alson Clark, Donna N. Schuster, and Sam Hyde Harris
- Maurice Cullen, Laura Muntz Lyall, and Helen McNicoll in Canada
- Wynford Dewhurst, Walter Richard Sickert, and Philip Wilson Steer were well known Impressionist painters from the United Kingdom. Pierre Adolphe Valette, who was born in France but who worked in Manchester, was the tutor of L. S. Lowry. William McTaggart in Scotland
- William John Leech, Roderic O'Conor, and Walter Osborne in Ireland
- The Australian Impressionists, including Tom Roberts, Arthur Streeton, Walter Withers, Charles Conder, Frederick McCubbin, and E. Phillips Fox (who were prominent members of the Heidelberg School), and John Russell, a friend of Van Gogh, Rodin, Monet and Matisse.
- James Nairn in New Zealand
- The Amsterdam Impressionists in the Netherlands, including George Hendrik Breitner, Isaac Israëls, Willem Bastiaan Tholen, Willem de Zwart, Willem Witsen, Marie Henry Mackenzie, and Jan Toorop.
- Anna Boch, Vincent van Gogh's friend Eugène Boch, Georges Lemmen, and Théo van Rysselberghe, Impressionist painters from Belgium.
- Skagen Painters a group of Scandinavian artists who painted in a small Danish fishing village
- Frits Thaulow in Norway and later France
- Ásgrímur Jónsson in Iceland
- Joaquín Sorolla and Fermín Arango in Spain
- The German Impressionists, including Max Liebermann, Lovis Corinth, Ernst Oppler, Max Slevogt, and August von Brandis
- Theodor von Ehrmanns and Hugo Charlemont, who were rare Impressionists among the more dominant Vienna Secessionist painters in Austria
- László Mednyánszky and Pál Szinyei Merse in Hungary
- The Slovenian Impressionists, Ivan Grohar, Rihard Jakopič, Matija Jama, and Matej Sternen. Their beginning was in the school of Anton Ažbe in Munich and they were influenced by Jurij Šubic, and Ivana Kobilca, Slovenian painters working in Paris.
- Nadežda Petrović, Milo Milunović, Kosta Miličević, Milan Milovanovi, and Mališa Glišić in Serbia
- Władysław Podkowiński, a Polish Impressionist and symbolist
- Nicolae Grigorescu in Romania
- Konstantin Korovin and Valentin Serov in Russia
- Nazmi Ziya Güran, who brought Impressionism to Turkey
- Chafik Charobim in Egypt
- Eliseu Visconti in Brazil
- Faustino Brughetti, Fernando Fader, Candido Lopez, Martín Malharro, Walter de Navazio, Ramón Silva in Argentina
- Francisco Oller, a native of Puerto Rico and a friend of Pissarro and Cézanne
- Fujishima Takeji in Japan

== Impressionism in other media ==
=== Sculpture ===
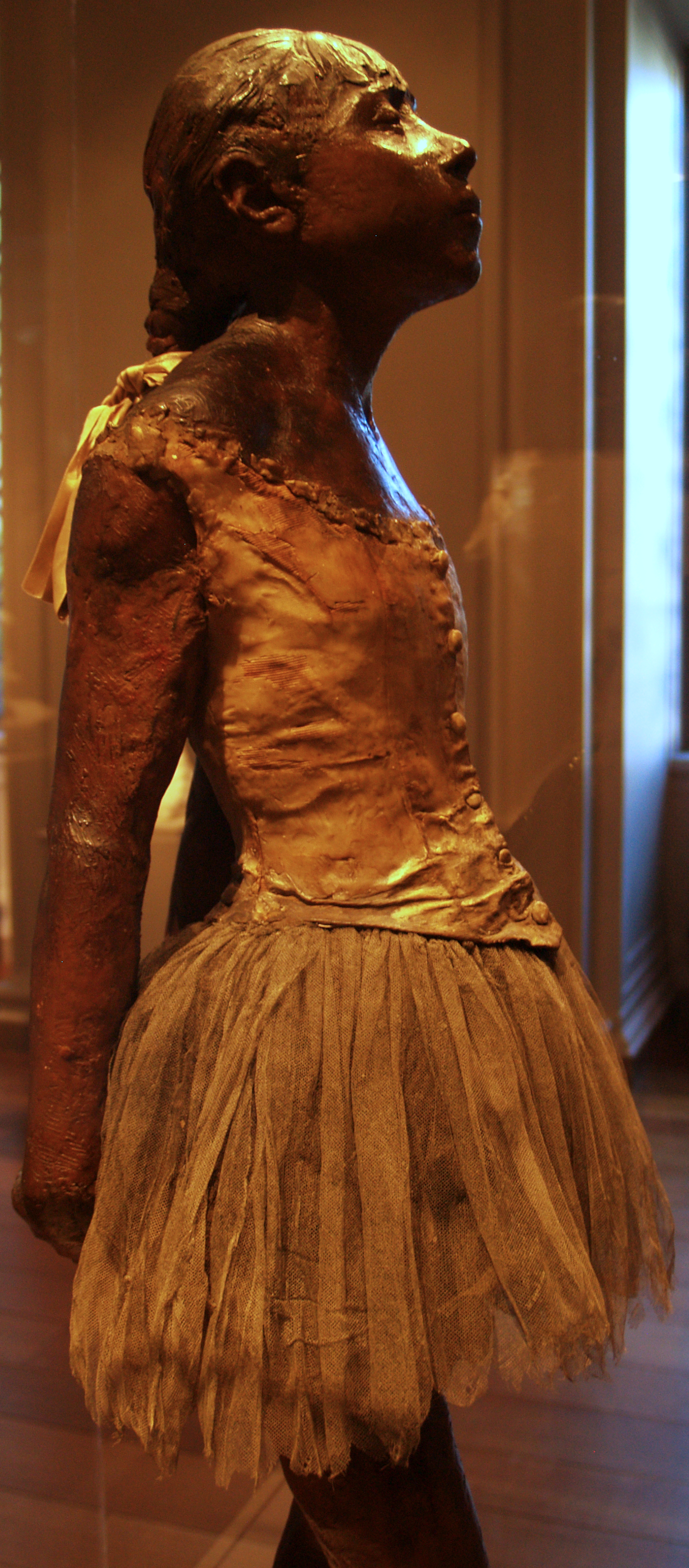
Edgar Degas – Little Dancer of Fourteen Years, National Gallery of Art Washington

While Edgar Degas was primarily known as a painter in his lifetime, he began to pursue the medium of sculpture later in his artistic career in the 1880s. He created as many as 150 sculptures during his lifetime. Degas preferred the medium of wax for his sculptures because it allowed him to make changes, start over, and further explore the modelling process. Only one of Degas's sculptures, Little Dancer of Fourteen Years, was exhibited in his lifetime, which was exhibited at the Sixth Impressionist Exhibition in 1881. Little Dancer proved to be controversial with critics. Some considered Degas to have overthrown sculptural traditions in the same way that Impressionism had overthrown the traditions of painting. Others found it to be ugly. Following the Degas's death in 1917, his heirs authorised bronze castings from 73 of the artist's sculptures.

The sculptor Auguste Rodin is sometimes called an Impressionist for the way he used roughly modelled surfaces to suggest transient light effects. The sculptor Medardo Rosso has also been called an Impressionist.

Some Russian artists created Impressionistic sculptures of animals in order to break away from old world concepts. Their works have been described as endowing birds and beasts with new spiritual characteristics.

=== Photography and film ===
While his photographs are less known than his paintings or his sculptures, Edgar Degas also pursued photography later in his life. His photographs were never exhibited during his lifetime, and not much attention was given to them following his death. It was not until the late 20th century that scholars started to take interest in Degas's photographs.

Pictorialist photographers, whose work is characterised by soft focus and atmospheric effects, have also been called Impressionists. These Impressionist photographers used various techniques such as photographing subjects out of focus, using soft focus or pinhole lenses, and manipulating the gum bichromate process to create images that resembled Impressionist paintings.

French Impressionist Cinema is a term applied to a loosely defined group of films and filmmakers in France from 1919 to 1929, although these years are debatable. French Impressionist filmmakers include Abel Gance, Jean Epstein, Germaine Dulac, Marcel L'Herbier, Louis Delluc, and Dimitri Kirsanoff.

=== Music ===
Reflets dans l'eau (5:33)
Composed by Debussy (1905), performed by Giorgi Latso (2017)

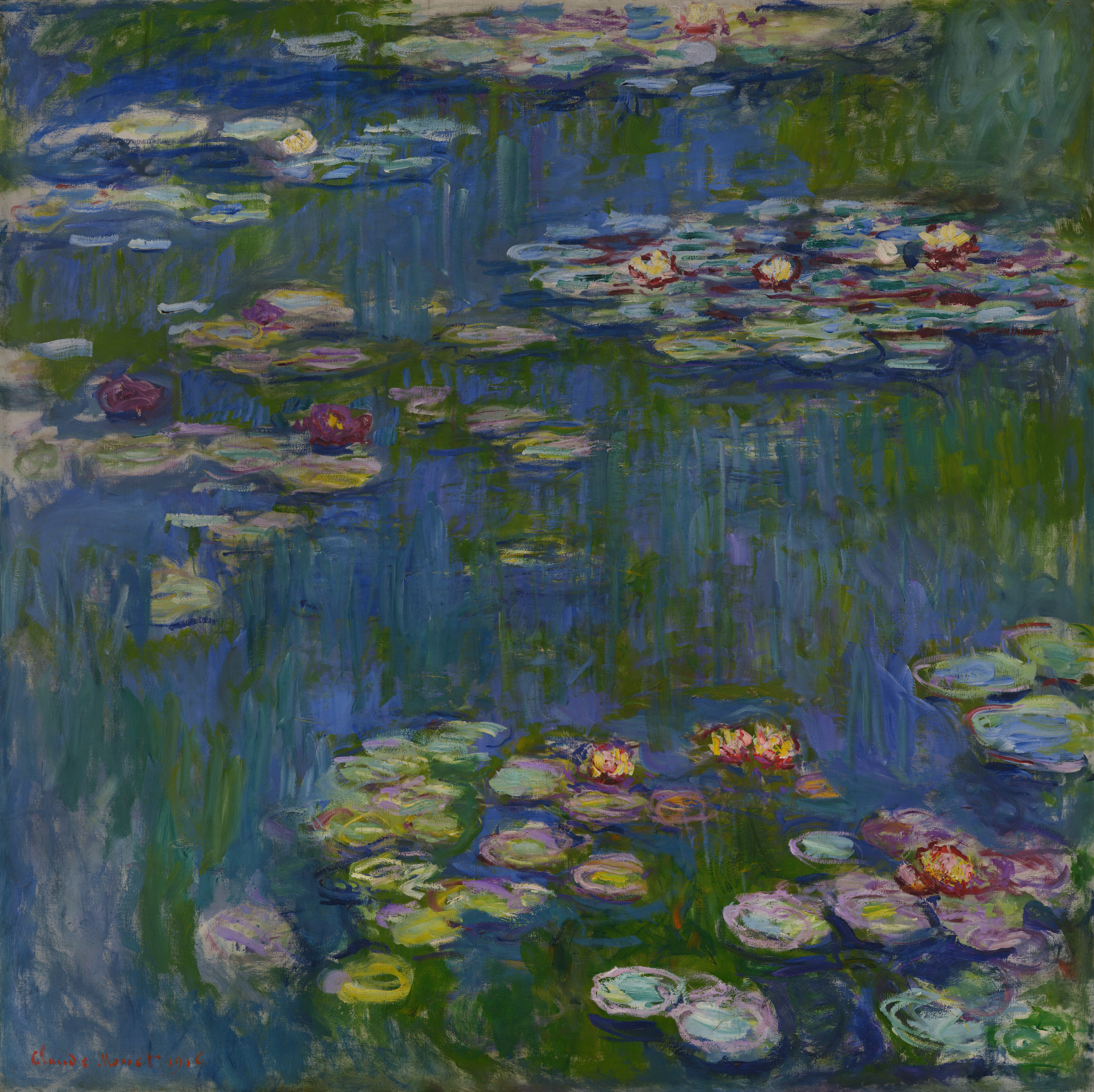
Claude Monet – Water Lilies (1916), National Museum of Western Art

Musical Impressionism is the name given to a movement in European classical music that arose in the late 19th century and continued into the middle of the 20th century. Originating in France, musical Impressionism is characterised by suggestion and atmosphere, and eschews the emotional excesses of the Romantic era. Impressionist composers favoured short forms such as the nocturne, arabesque, and prelude, and often explored uncommon scales such as the whole tone scale. Perhaps the most notable innovations of Impressionist composers were the introduction of major 7th chords and the extension of chord structures in 3rds to five- and six-part harmonies.

The influence of visual Impressionism on its musical counterpart is debatable. Claude Debussy and Maurice Ravel are generally considered the greatest Impressionist composers, but Debussy disavowed the term, calling it the invention of critics. Erik Satie was also considered in this category, though his approach was regarded as less serious and more musical novelty in nature.

Paul Dukas is another French composer sometimes considered an Impressionist, but his style is perhaps more closely aligned to the late Romanticists, Lili Boulanger, however, has clear Debussian sounds and has been considered as an Impressionist also. Musical Impressionism beyond France includes the work of such composers as Ottorino Respighi (Italy), Ralph Vaughan Williams, Cyril Scott, and John Ireland (England), Alexander Scriabin (Russia), Manuel De Falla and Isaac Albeniz (Spain), and Charles Griffes (America).

American Impressionist music differs from European Impressionist music, and these differences are mainly reflected in Charles Tomlinson Griffes's Poem for flute and orchestra. He is also the most prolific Impressionist composer in the United States.

=== Literature ===
The term Impressionism has also been used to describe works of literature in which a few select details suffice to convey the sensory impressions of an incident or scene. Impressionist literature is closely related to Symbolism, with its major exemplars being Baudelaire, Stéphane Mallarmé, Rimbaud, and Verlaine. Authors such as Virginia Woolf, D.H. Lawrence, Henry James, and Joseph Conrad have written works that are Impressionistic in the way that they describe, rather than interpret, the impressions, sensations and emotions that constitute a character's mental life. Some literary scholars, such as John G. Peters, believe literary Impressionism is better defined by its philosophical stance than by any supposed relationship with Impressionist painting.

Camille Pissarro – Children on a Farm (1887

== Post-Impressionism ==
During the 1880s several artists began to develop different precepts for the use of colour, pattern, form, and line, derived from the Impressionist example: Vincent van Gogh, Paul Gauguin, Georges Seurat, and Henri de Toulouse-Lautrec. These artists were slightly younger than the Impressionists, and their work is known as post-Impressionism. Post-Impressionist artists reacted against the Impressionists' concern with realistically reproducing the optical sensations of light and colour; they turned instead toward symbolic content and the expression of emotion.

Examples of Post-Impressionism art include Pointillism, Cloisonnism and Synthetism.

Post-Impressionism prefigured the characteristics of Futurism and Cubism, reflecting the change of attitude towards art in European society. Some of the original Impressionist artists also ventured into this new territory; Camille Pissarro briefly painted in a pointillist manner, and even Monet abandoned strict plein air painting. Paul Cézanne, who participated in the first and third Impressionist exhibitions, developed a highly individual vision emphasising pictorial structure, and he is more often called a post-Impressionist. Although these cases illustrate the difficulty of assigning labels, the work of the original Impressionist painters may, by definition, be categorised as Impressionism.

Post-Impressionism

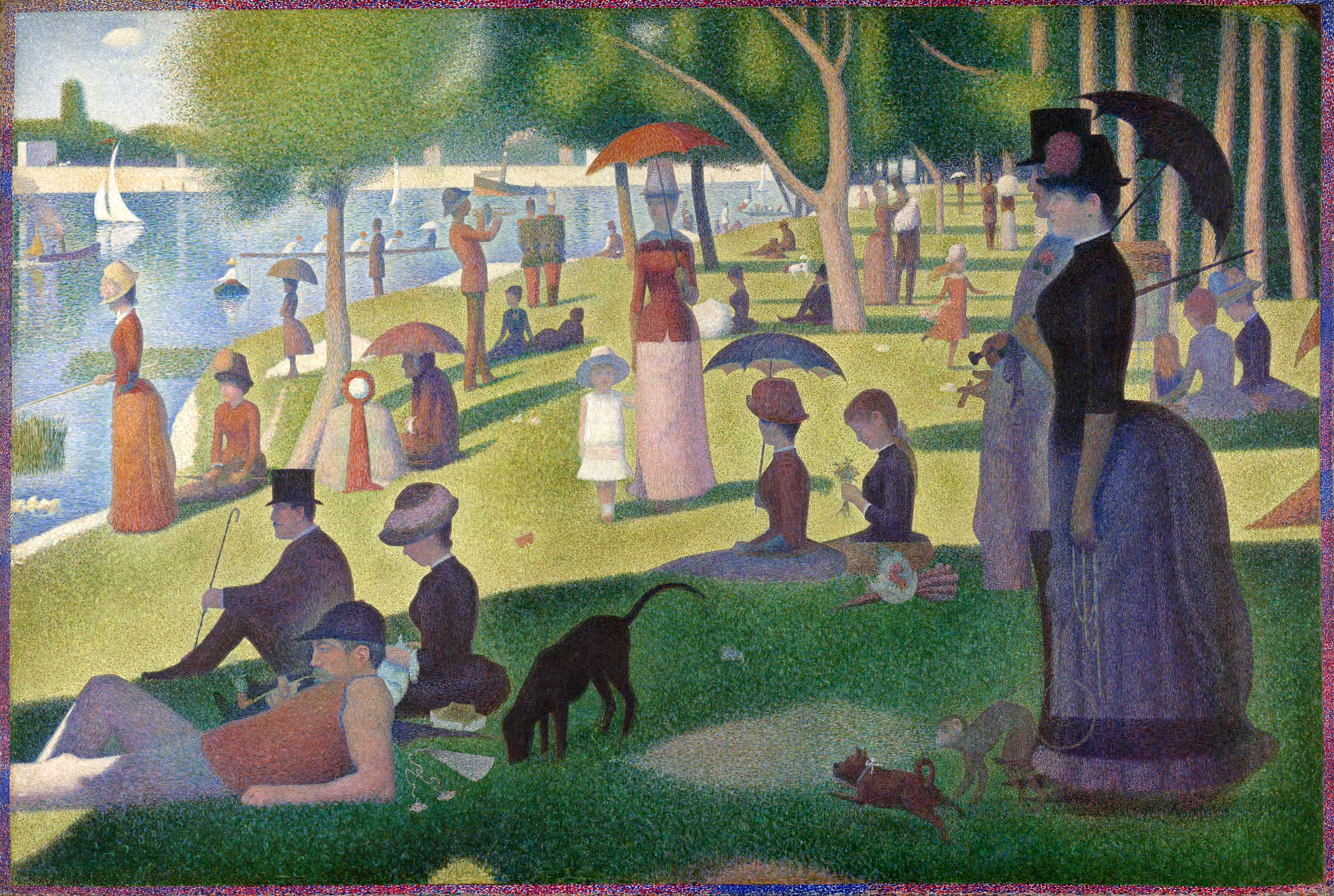
Georges Seurat – A Sunday Afternoon on the Island of La Grande Jatte (1884–1886), The Art Institute of Chicago

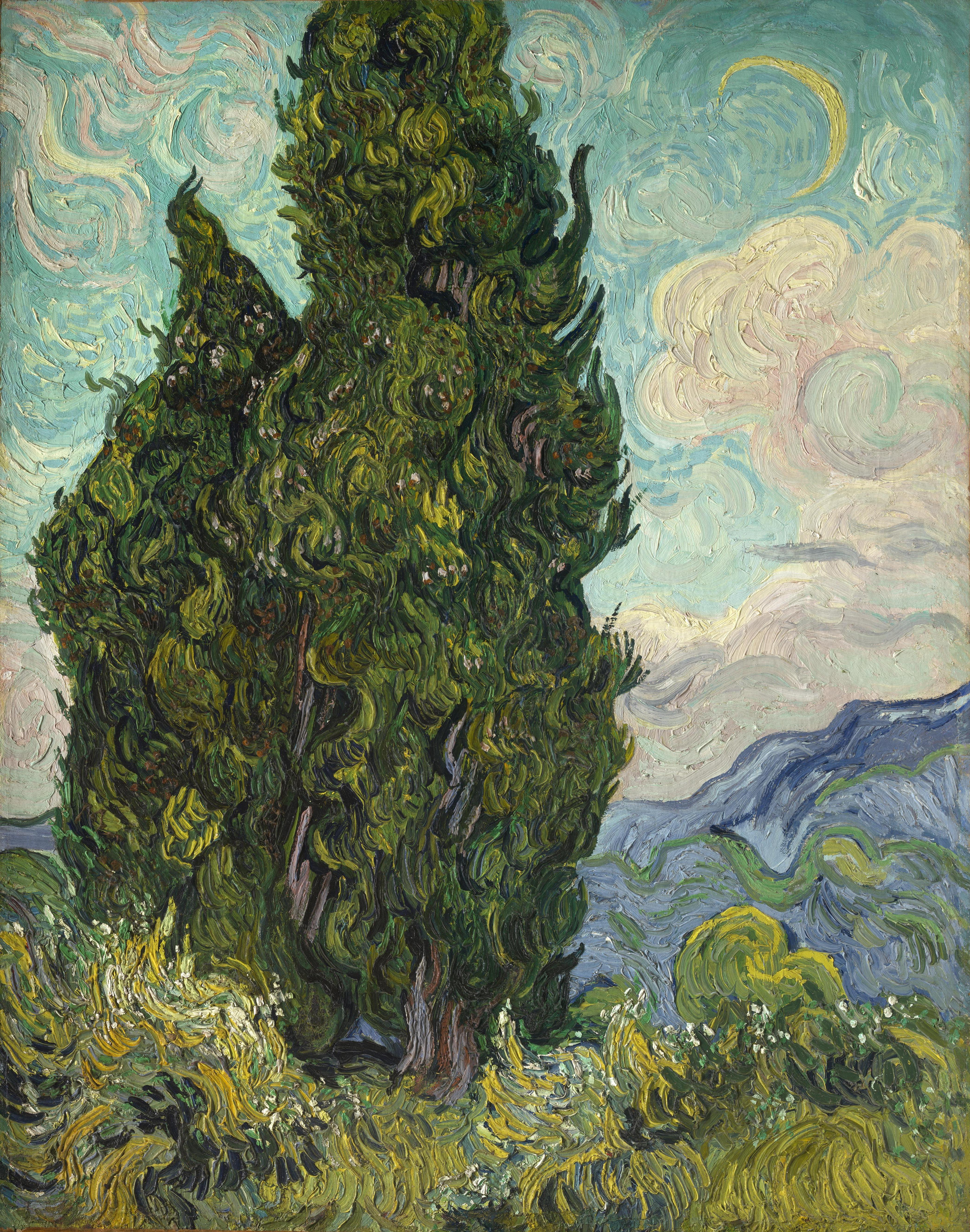
Vincent van Gogh – Cypresses (1889), Metropolitan Museum of Art

Paul Gauguin – The Midday Nap (1894), Metropolitan Museum of Art

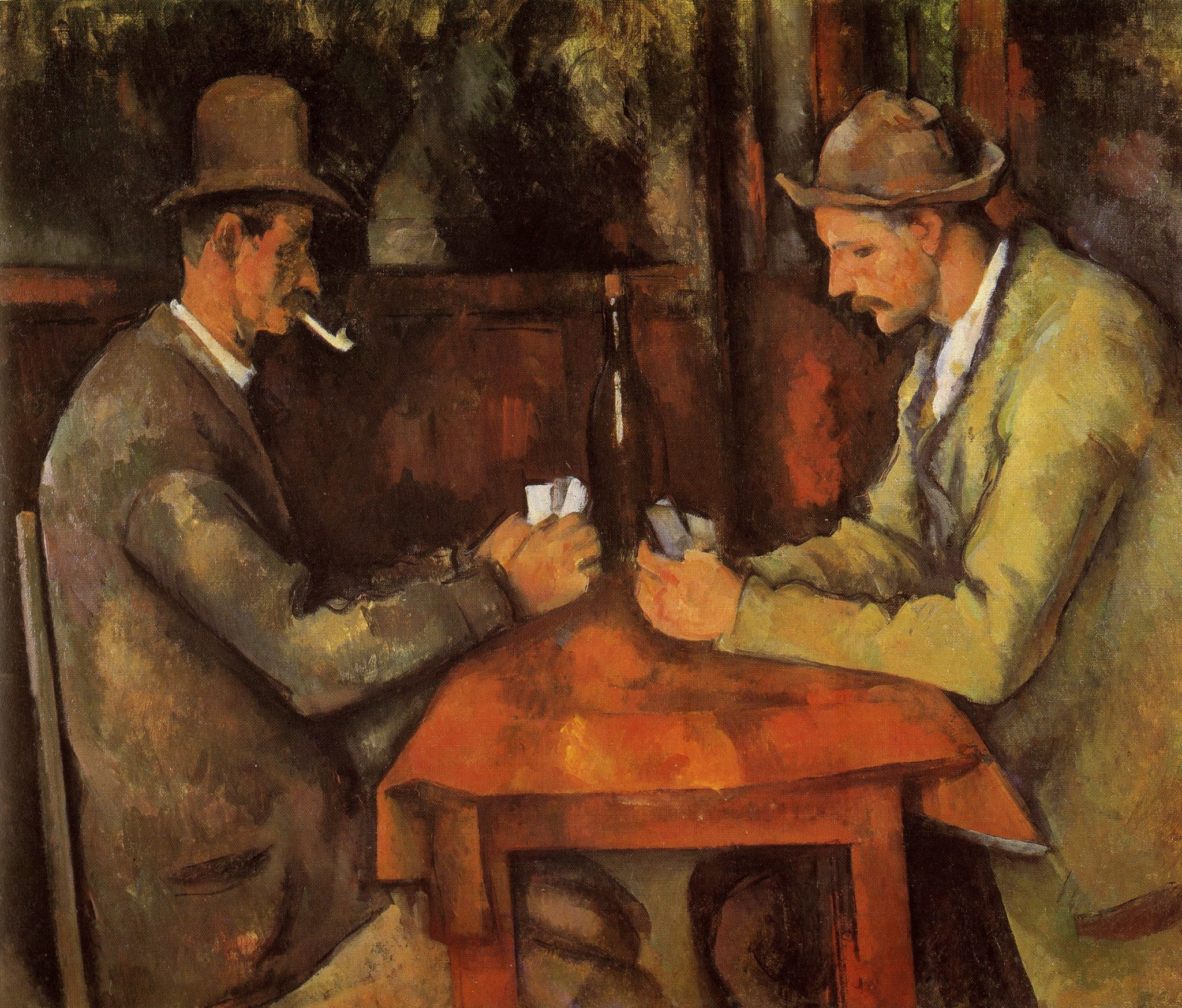
Paul Cézanne – The Card Players (1894–1895), Musée d'Orsay

== See also ==
- Cantonese school of painting, influenced by Impressionism
- History of painting
- Les XX
- Luminism (Impressionism)
- Periods in Western art history

== Citations ==
=== Works cited ===
- Baumann, Felix; Karabelnik, eds. (1994). Degas Portraits. London: Merrell Holberton. ISBN 1-85894-014-1.
- Bomford, David; Kirby, Jo; Leighton, John; Roy, Ashok (1990). Art in the Making: Impressionism. London: The National Gallery of London. ISBN 0-300-05035-6.
- Denvir, Bernard (1990). The Thames and Hudson Encyclopaedia of Impressionism. London: Thames and Hudson. ISBN 0-500-20239-7.
- Distel, Anne; Hoog, Michel; Moffett, Charles S. (1974). Impressionism; A Centenary Exhibition. New York: Metropolitan Museum of Art. ISBN 0-87099-097-7. Archived from the original on 8 November 2018.
- Eisenman, Stephen F. (2010). From Corot to Monet: The Ecology of Impressionism. Milan: Skira. ISBN 978-88-572-0706-3.
- Garb, Tamar (1986). Women Impressionists. New York: Rizzoli International Publications. ISBN 0-8478-0757-6. OCLC 14368525.
- Gordon, Robert; Forge, Andrew (1988). Degas. New York: Harry N. Abrams, Inc. ISBN 0-8109-1142-6.
- Gowing, Lawrence; Adriani, Götz; Krumrine, Mary Louise; Lewis, Mary Tompkins; Patin, Sylvie; Rewald, John (1988). Stevens, Mary Anne (ed.). Cézanne: The Early Years 1859–1872. New York: Harry N. Abrams, Inc.
- Huyghe, René (1973). Impressionism. New York: Chartwell Books. OCLC 49692648.
- Jensen, Robert (1994). Marketing modernism in fin-de-siècle Europe. Princeton, NJ: Princeton University Press. ISBN 0-691-03333-1.
- Moffett, Charles S (1986). The New Painting, Impressionism 1874–1886. Geneva: Richard Burton SA.
- Rewald, John (1973). The History of Impressionism (4th Revised ed.). New York: The Museum of Modern Art. ISBN 0-87070-360-9.
- Richardson, John (1976). Manet (3rd ed.). Oxford: Phaidon Press Ltd. ISBN 0-7148-1743-0.
- Rosenblum, Robert (1989). Paintings in the Musée d'Orsay. New York: Stewart, Tabori & Chang. ISBN 1-55670-099-7.
- Sérullaz, Maurice (1962). Moskowitz, Ira (ed.). French Impressionists: A Selection of Drawings of the French 19th Century. Boston and Toronto: Little, Brown and Company. ISBN 0-316-58560-2.
- Stoner, Joyce Hill; Rushfield, Rebecca Anne (2012). The Conservation of Easel Paintings. London: Routledge. ISBN 978-1-136-00041-6. Archived from the original on 12 November 2022.
