= Les Orangers =

Painting by Gustave Caillebotte

- The Orange Trees (English)
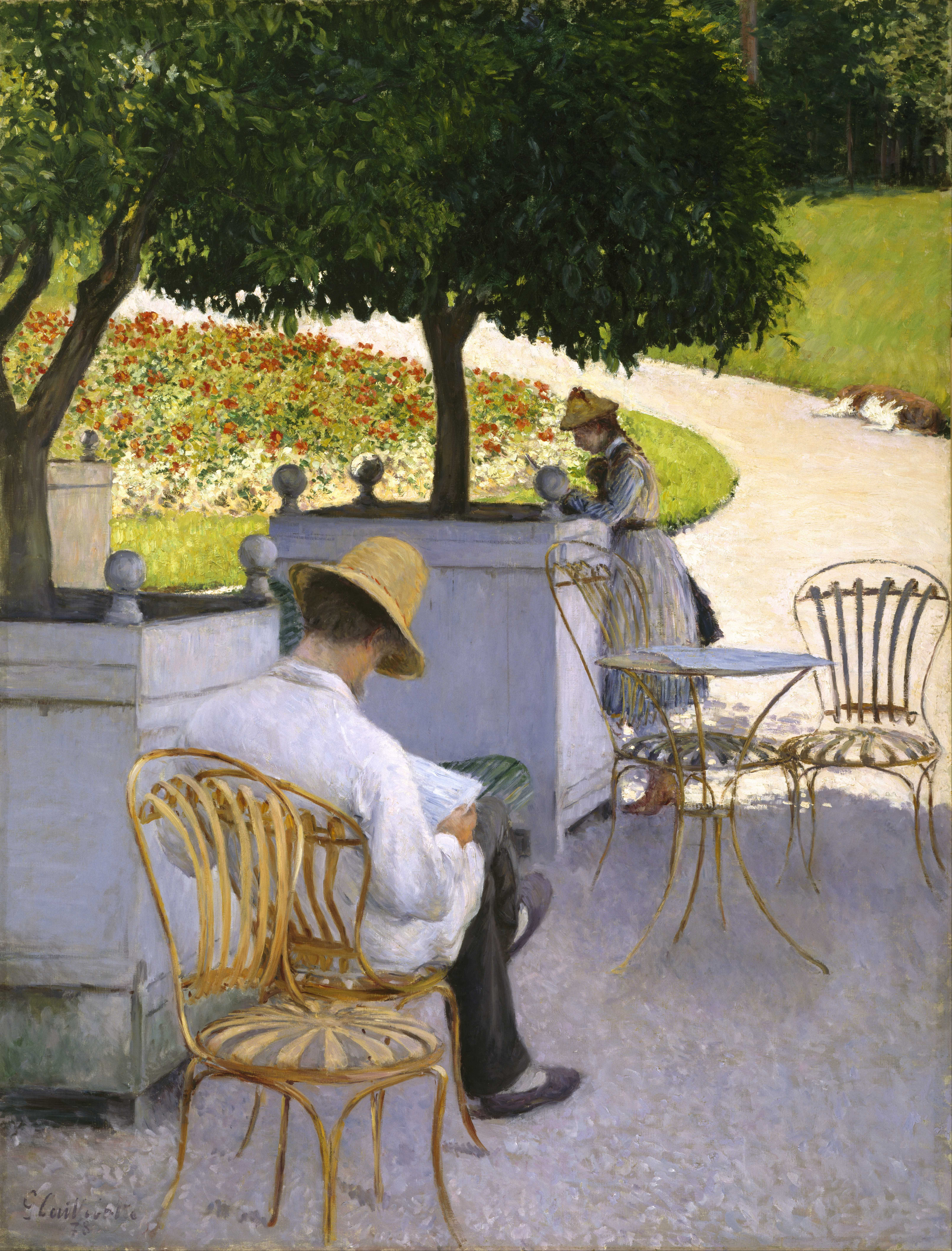
- Artist: Gustave Caillebotte
- Year: 1878
- Medium: Oil on canvas
- Dimensions: 155 cm × 117 cm (61 in × 46 in)
- Location: Museum of Fine Arts Houston, Houston

Les Orangers (English title: The Orange Trees) is an oil painting by French impressionist Gustave Caillebotte. The canvas measures 155 by 117 centimetres (61 in × 46 in). It was acquired by Audrey Jones Beck and was part of a collection that was on a long-term loan to the Museum of Fine Arts, Houston, before the collection was donated to the museum in 1999. The painting now hangs in the museum building named for Beck.

== Composition ==
Caillebotte, in common with other impressionist painters of the time, had an affinity for horticulture and was one of the movement's most avid gardeners. While many of his contemporaries preferred more organic and wild settings, Caillebotte preferred manicured, formal arrangements. He trained his fruit trees with careful pruning to encourage compact growth. Critics have suggested that this may have been in keeping with his interest in perspective.

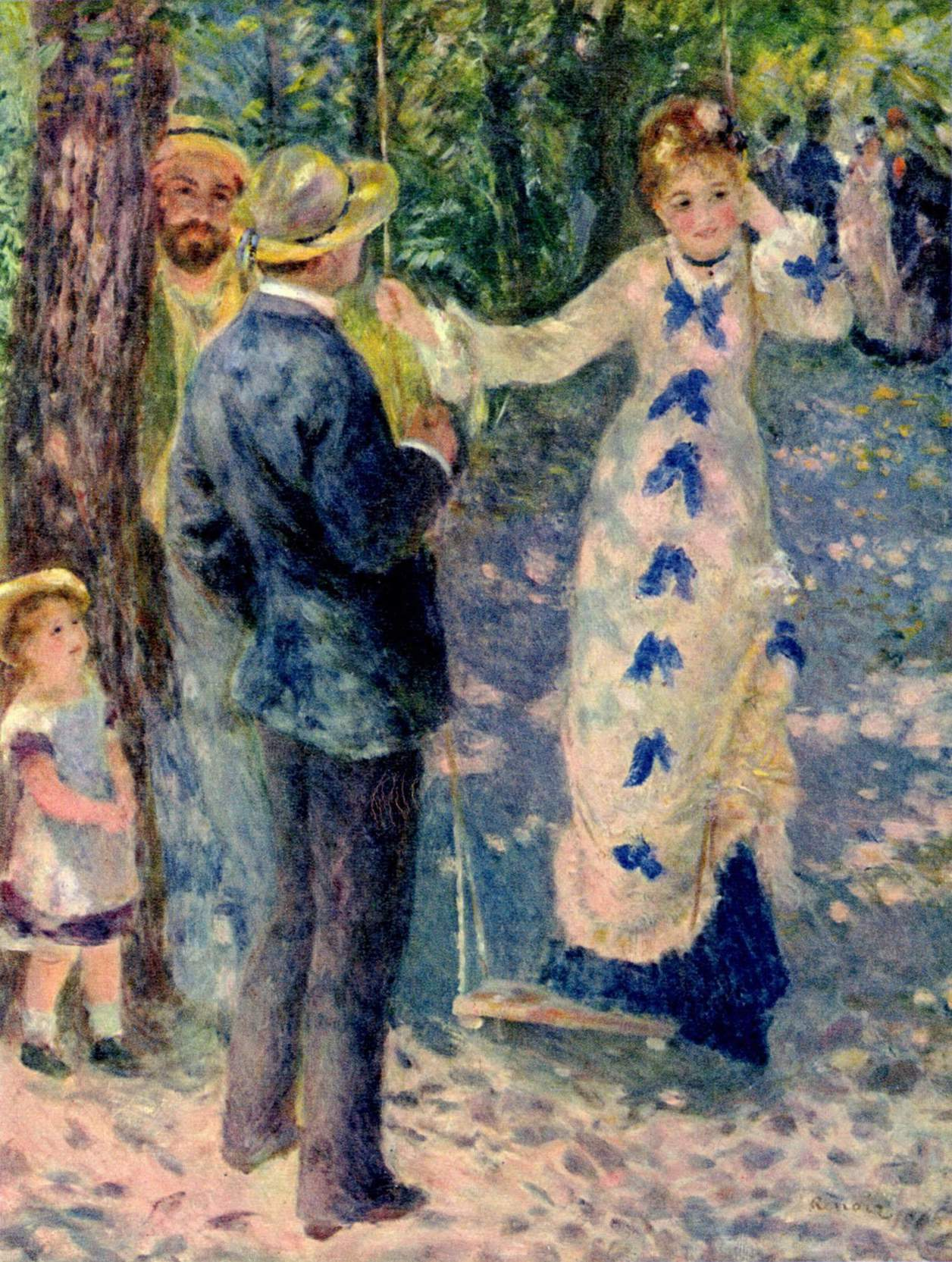
The Swing, by Pierre-Auguste Renoir (1876) shows a dappled treatment of light and shade.

Caillebotte painted this canvas en plein air at the family's country estate in Yerres in 1878. Although impressionist painters were known for painting outdoors, large canvases such as this, painted with this technique, were uncommon due to the difficulties in creating such a large work quickly, before the light changed. Caillebotte obtained one such example, Le Déjeuner by Claude Monet in March of that year, and it is likely to have influenced this work.

The image depicts a daytime scene. Caillebotte's brother Martial is reading while sitting in the shade of the orange trees with his back towards the viewer. He is dressed in the same way as Gustave himself in Renoir's Oarsmen at Chatou. Their cousin, Zoé Caillebotte, is standing at one of the Versailles tubs, then fashionable as garden planters, which contain the trees. The poses of Martial and Zoé suggest that they are each enjoying the afternoon quietly with their private thoughts. The lightweight painted sprung-steel garden chairs in the foreground appear in other works painted at Yerres, and can be seen in a contemporaneous photograph of the estate. In the background, the bright sunlight illuminates a circular flower bed surrounded by a curving gravel path, at the edge of which a dog appears to be sleeping.

Caillebotte employs sharp contrast between the shady foreground in the lower part of the image and the bright background. The shadows are painted in muted greens and purples, while the lawn and flower beds are brilliant greens, reds and whites. The strong definition between the areas of sunlight and shadow is a departure from the dappled light that occurs in similar outdoor scenes by Impressionists Renoir and Monet. Art historian and critic Kirk Varnedoe suggests that this contrast contributes to a sense of afternoon heat.

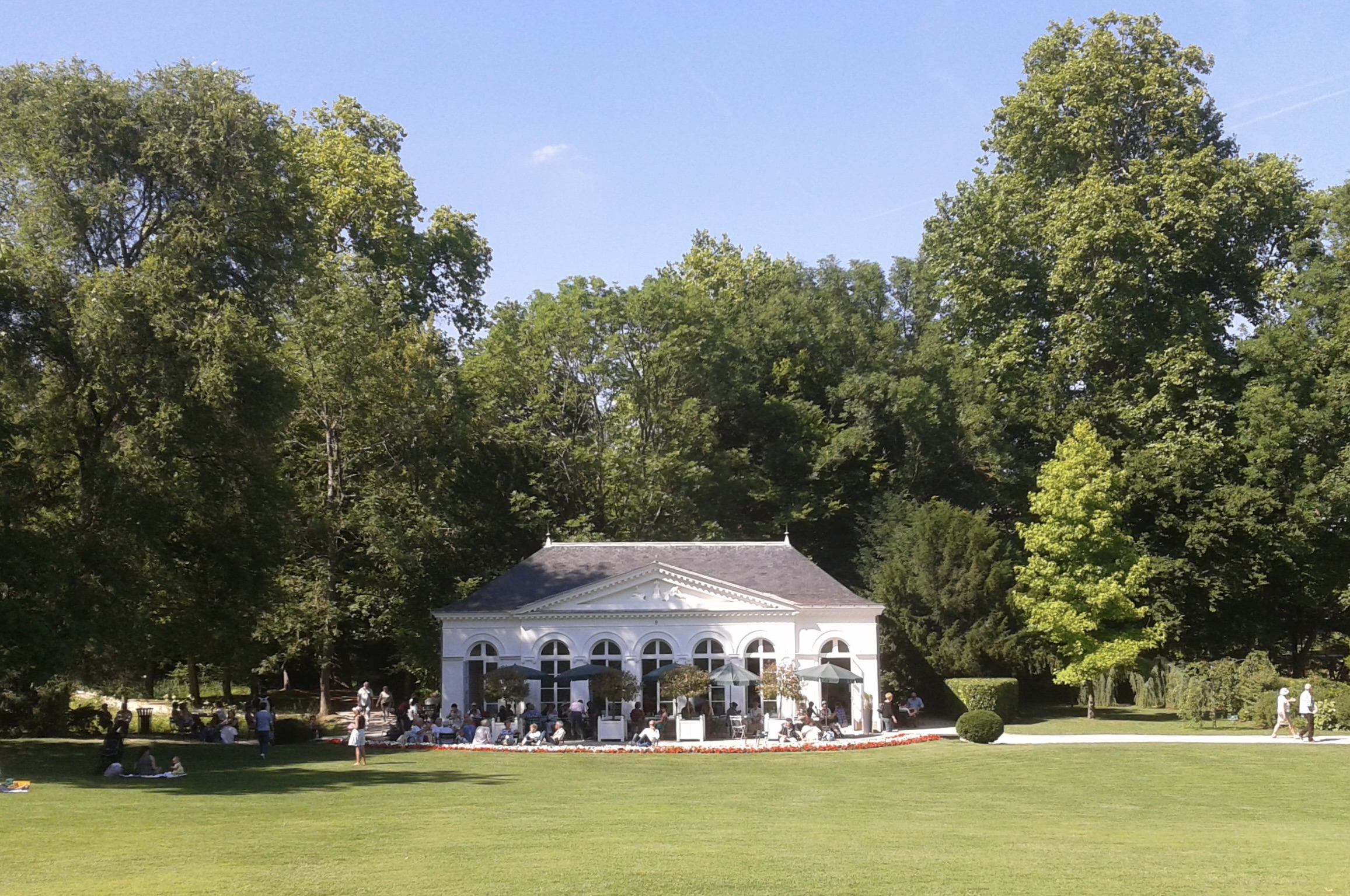
Photograph of the orangery on the Caillebotte estate in 2014.

== See also ==
- List of paintings by Gustave Caillebotte
