= Gustave Caillebotte =

French painter (1848–1894)

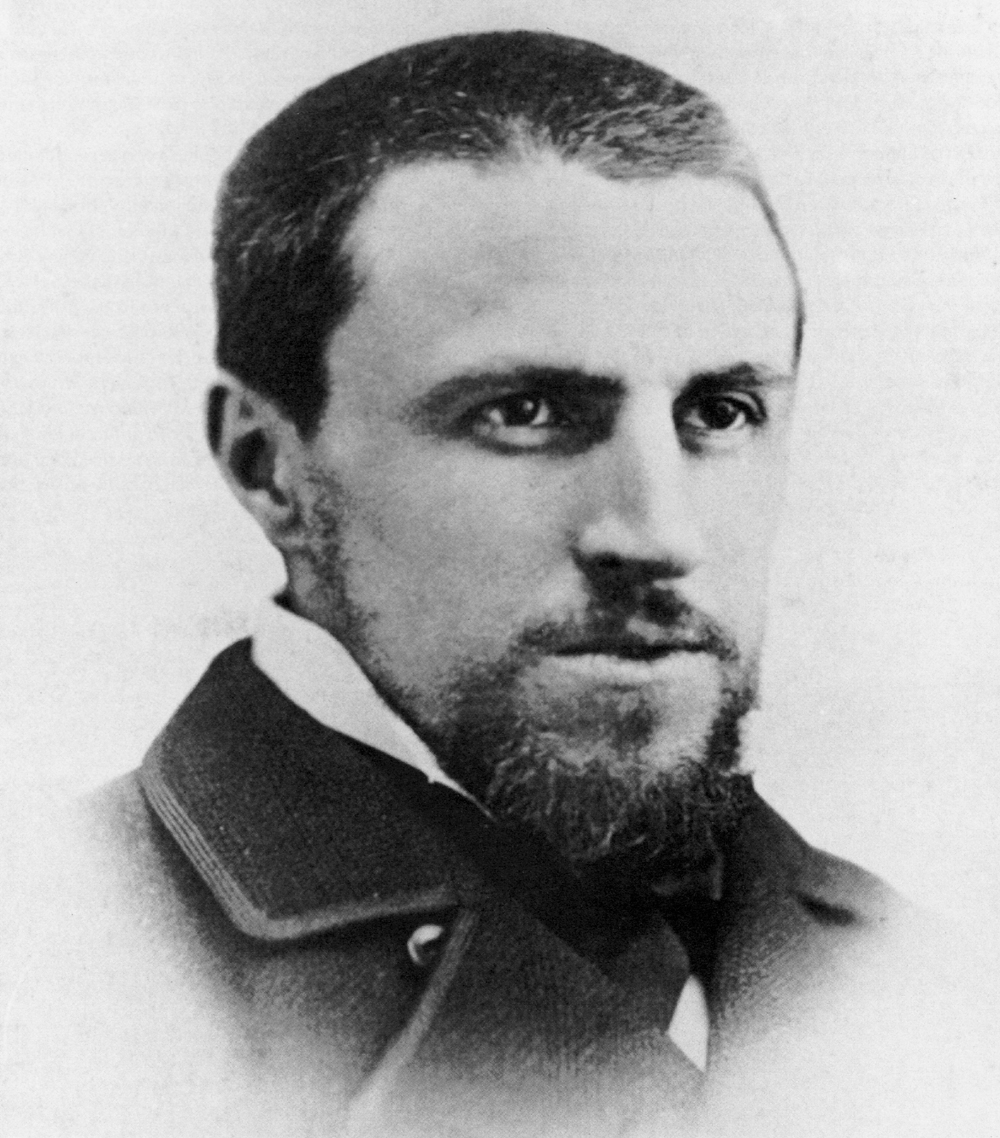
- Caillebotte, about age 30, c. 1878
- Born: 19 August 1848; Paris, France
- Died: 21 February 1894 (aged 45); Gennevilliers, France
- Resting place: Père Lachaise Cemetery, Paris
- Education: École des Beaux-Arts
- Known for: Painting
- Notable work: Paris Street; Rainy Day (1877); Les raboteurs de parquet (1875); Young Man at His Window (1876); Le Pont de l'Europe (1876); Boating Party (1877–78)
- Movement: Realism, Impressionism

Signature
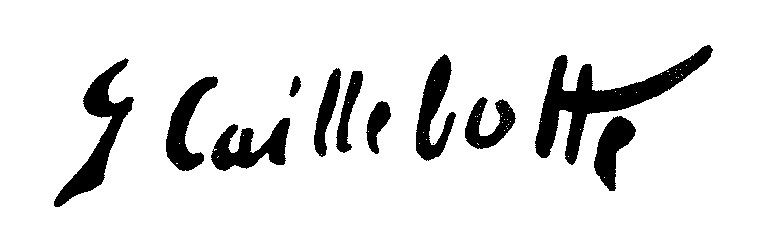

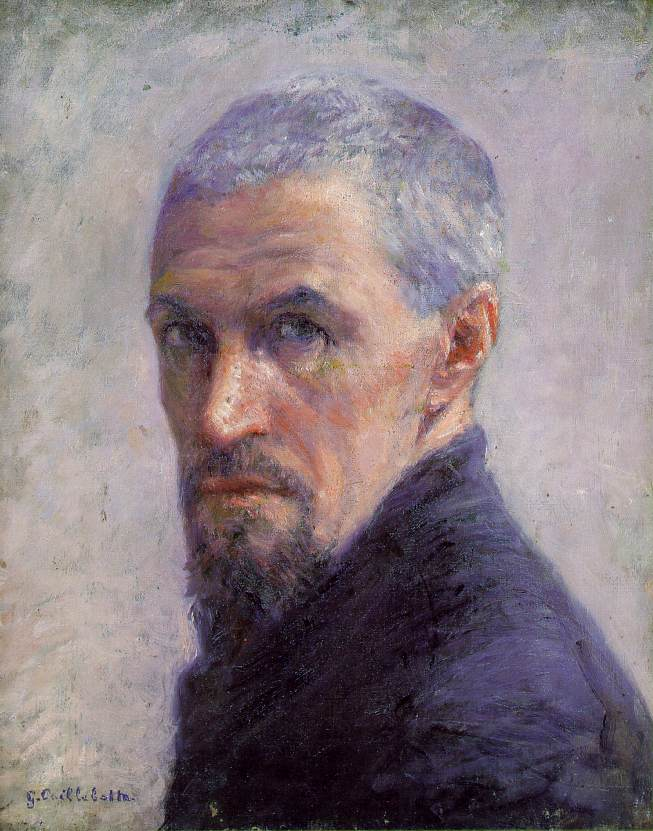
Portrait de l'artiste (Self-portrait). c. 1892. Musée d'Orsay, Paris

Gustave Caillebotte (French: [ɡystav kɑjbɔt]; 19 August 1848 – 21 February 1894) was a French painter who was a member and patron of the Impressionists, although he painted in a more realistic manner than many others in the group. Caillebotte was known for his early interest in photography as an art form. Because of his family's wealth, he was a patron of many of his fellow Impressionists. Upon his death, his bequeathed collection of their works became the central collection of Impressionism for the French Republic, despite considerable controversy.

His most well known work is Paris Street; Rainy Day, known for qualities such as its mise-en-scène presentation. The Art Institute of Chicago acquired the painting in 1964 and his work drew more attention in the 1970s. Although Caillebotte has long been regarded for his philanthropy and support as a patron and promoter of Impressionism, he did not have an international retrospective of his work until 1994, 100 years after his death. In 2022, when France successfully attained possession of Boating Party, known for its close-up action perspective, through a National treasure of France declaration process, the country asserted the work's cultural significance and prominence with a celebrated display, followed by a national tour of the work, and then an exhibition of Caillebotte's work that toured internationally.

== Early life ==
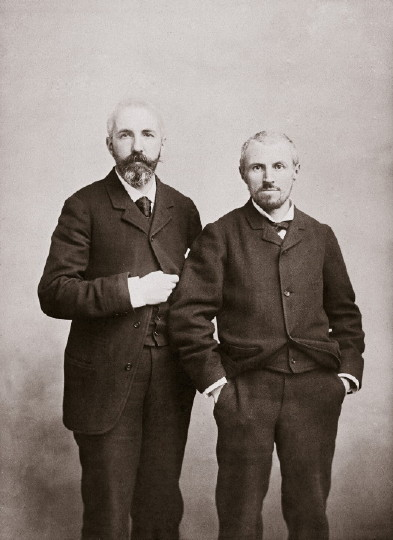
Gustave Caillebotte (right) and his brother, Martial

Gustave Caillebotte was born on 19 August 1848 to an upper-class Parisian family living in the rue du Faubourg-Saint-Denis. His father, Martial Caillebotte (1799–1874), inherited the family's military textile business and was also a judge at the Tribunal de commerce de la Seine. Caillebotte's father was twice widowed before marrying Caillebotte's mother, Céleste Daufresne (1819–1878), who had two more sons after Gustave: René (1851–1876) and Martial (1853–1910).

Caillebotte earned a law degree in 1868 and a license to practice law in 1870. He also was an engineer. Shortly after his education, he was drafted to fight in the Franco-Prussian War and served from July 1870 to March 1871 in the Garde Nationale Mobile de la Seine.

== Artistic life ==
=== Development ===
Caillebotte began painting during his war service. After the war, Caillebotte began visiting the studio of the painter Léon Bonnat, where he started to study painting seriously. He then developed an accomplished style in a relatively short time and had his first studio in his parents' home. In 1873, Caillebotte entered the École des Beaux-Arts, but apparently did not spend much time there. In some of his early works he used mother and brothers as models. His artist's studio was built in the family home at his father's direction. He inherited his father's fortune upon the latter's death in 1874 and the surviving sons divided the family fortune after their mother's death in 1878. Gustave and his brother subsequently sold the Yerres estate and moved into an apartment on the Boulevard Haussmann in Paris.

Around 1874, Caillebotte had met and befriended several artists working outside the Académie des Beaux-Arts, including Edgar Degas and Giuseppe de Nittis, and attended (but did not participate in) the First Impressionist Exhibition of 1874. The "Impressionists"—also called the "Independents", "Intransigents", and "Intentionalists"—had broken away from the academic painters showing in the annual Salons.

Caillebotte made his debut in the Second Impressionist Exhibition in 1876 showing eight paintings, including Les raboteurs de parquet (The Floor Scrapers, 1875), his earliest masterpiece. Its subject, the depiction of labourers preparing a wooden floor (thought to have been that of the artist's own studio), was considered "vulgar" by some critics and is probably why the Salon of 1875 rejected it. At the time, the art establishment deemed only rustic peasants or farmers acceptable subjects from the working class. By the third Impressionist exhibition in 1877, Caillebotte had assumed the leadership role for the events by securing rental space, selecting artists and works, and hanging works. Managing the desires and expectations of other aspiring artists was not without cost, however, and his involvement eventually declined. In the end, he presented works in five of the eight impressionist exhibitions.

=== Style ===
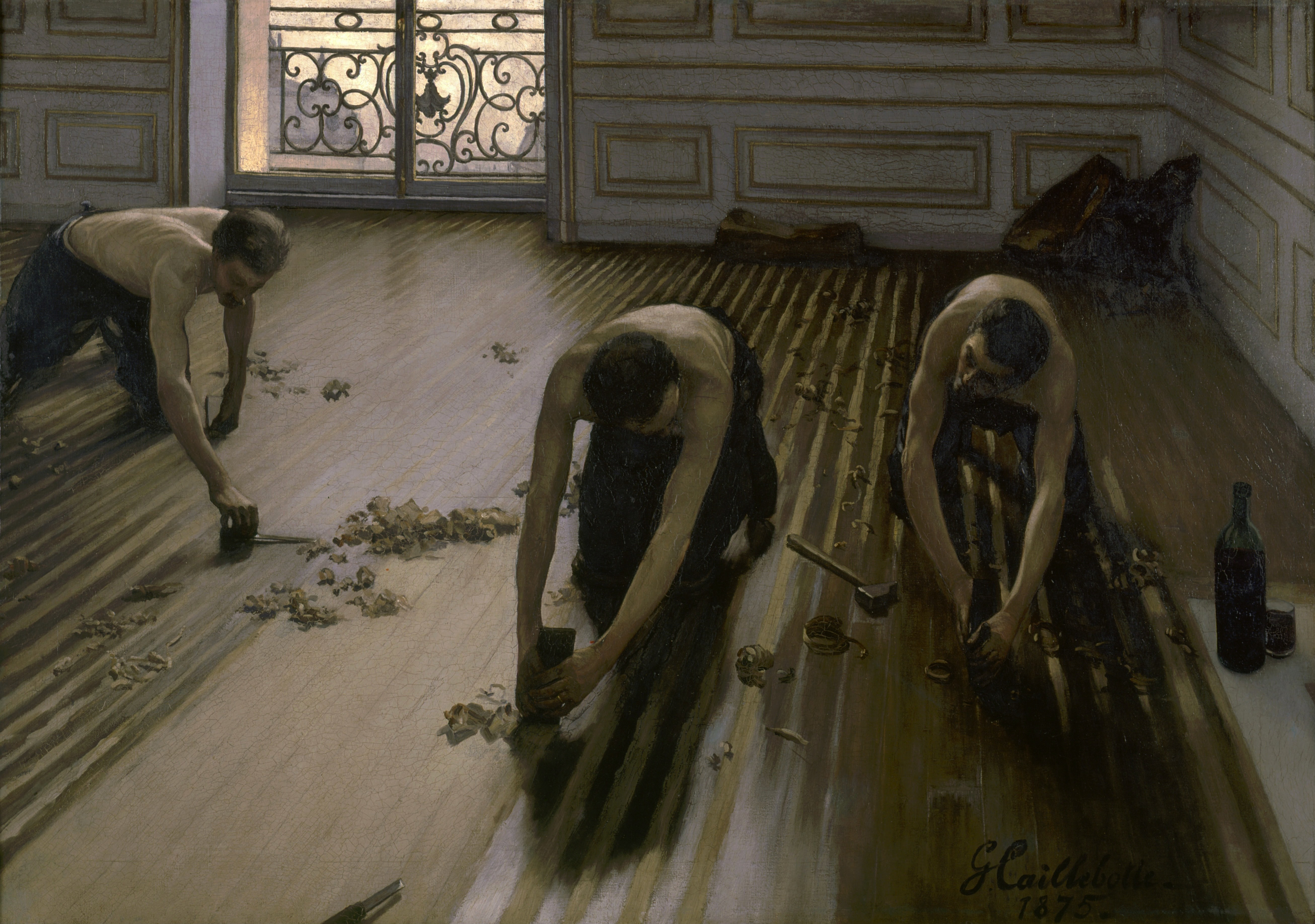
Les raboteurs de parquet (1875), a controversial realist subject, Musée d'Orsay

In common with his precursors Jean-François Millet and Gustave Courbet, as well his contemporary Degas, Caillebotte aimed to paint reality as he saw it, hoping to reduce the inherent theatricality of painting. Perhaps because of his close relationship with so many of his peers, his style and technique vary considerably among his works, as if "borrowing" and experimenting but not really sticking to any one style. At times, he seems very much in the Degas camp of rich-colored realism (especially his interior scenes); at other times, he shares the Impressionist commitment to "optical truth" and employs an impressionistic pastel-softness and loose brush strokes most similar to Renoir and Pissarro, although with a less vibrant palette.

The tilted ground common to these paintings is characteristic of Caillebotte's work, which may have been strongly influenced by Japanese prints and the new technology of photography, although evidence of his use of photography is lacking. Cropping and "zooming-in", techniques that commonly are found in Caillebotte's oeuvre, may also be the result of his interest in photography, but may just as likely be derived from his intense interest in perspective effects. A great number of Caillebotte's works also employ a very high vantage point, including View of Rooftops (Snow) (Vue de toits (Effet de neige), 1878), Boulevard Seen from Above (Boulevard vu d'en haut, 1880), and A Traffic Island (Un refuge, boulevard Haussmann, 1880).

=== Themes ===
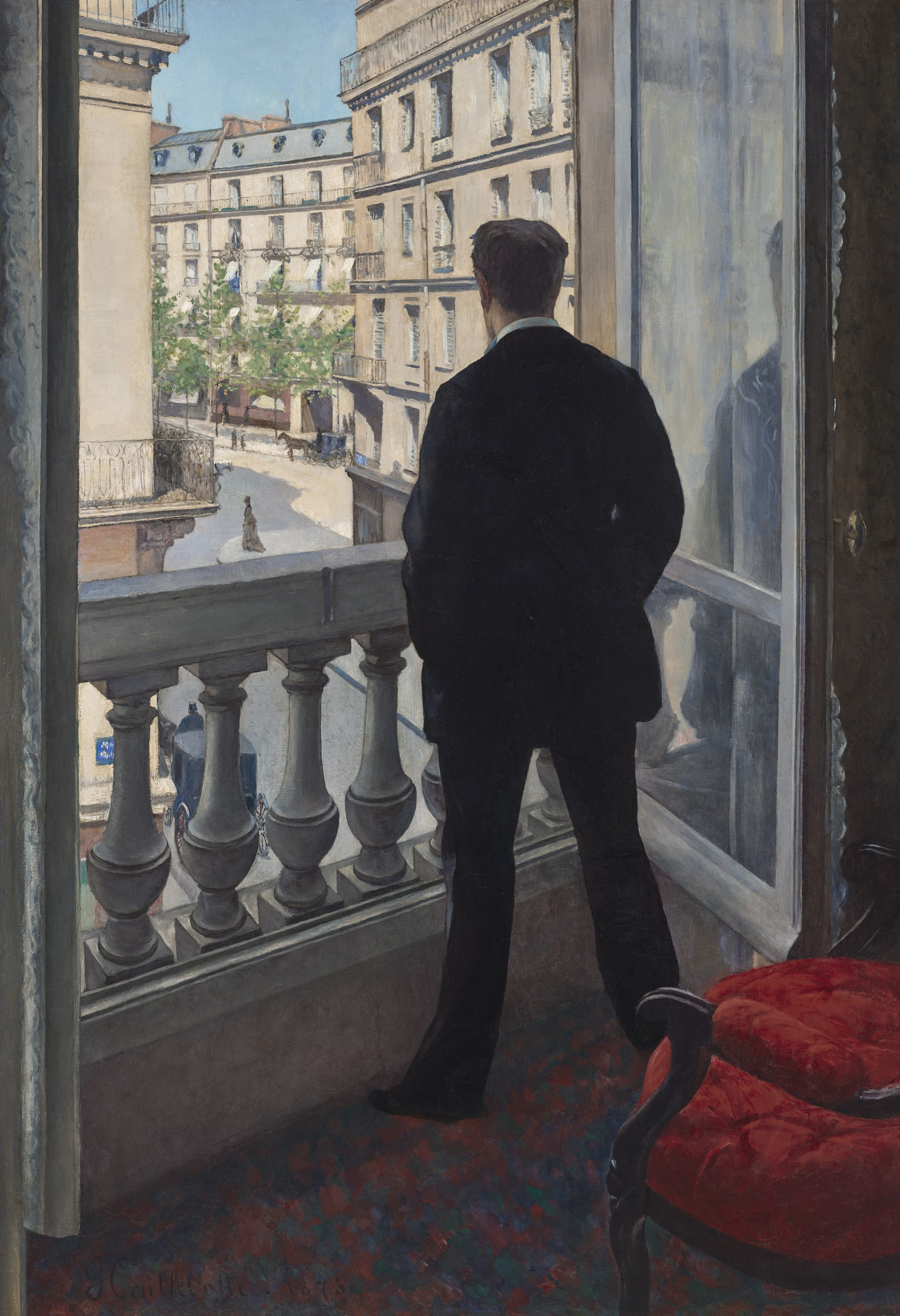
Young Man at His Window (1876), J. Paul Getty Museum

Caillebotte painted many domestic and familial scenes, interiors, and portraits. Many of his paintings depict members of his family: Young Man at His Window (Jeune Homme à la fenêtre, 1876) shows René in the home on rue de Miromesnil; The Orange Trees (Les Orangers, 1878), depicts Martial Jr. and his cousin Zoé in the garden of the family property at Yerres; and Portraits in the Country (Portraits à la campagne, 1875) includes Caillebotte's mother along with his aunt, cousin, and a family friend. There are scenes of dining, card playing, piano playing, reading, and sewing, all executed in an intimate, unobtrusive manner that portrays the quiet ritual of upper-class indoor life.

His country scenes at Yerres focus on pleasure boating on the leisurely stream as well as fishing and swimming, and domestic scenes around his country home. He often used a soft impressionistic technique reminiscent of Renoir to convey the tranquil nature of the countryside, in sharp contrast to the flatter, smoother strokes of his urban paintings. In Oarsman in a Top Hat (also known as Boating Party, 1877), he effectively manages the perspective of a passenger in the back of a rowboat facing his rowing companion and the stream ahead in a manner much more realistic and involving than Manet's Boating (1874). Boating Party was submitted by Caillebotte to the Fourth Impressionist Exhibition in 1879. He submitted a total of 35 paintings and pastels to the 1879 exhibition. Boating Party was considered one of the best of the set that also included Vue de toits. This set, which is focused on "water sports, boating and riverside leisure", is described as the most important exhibition of his works as a living artist.

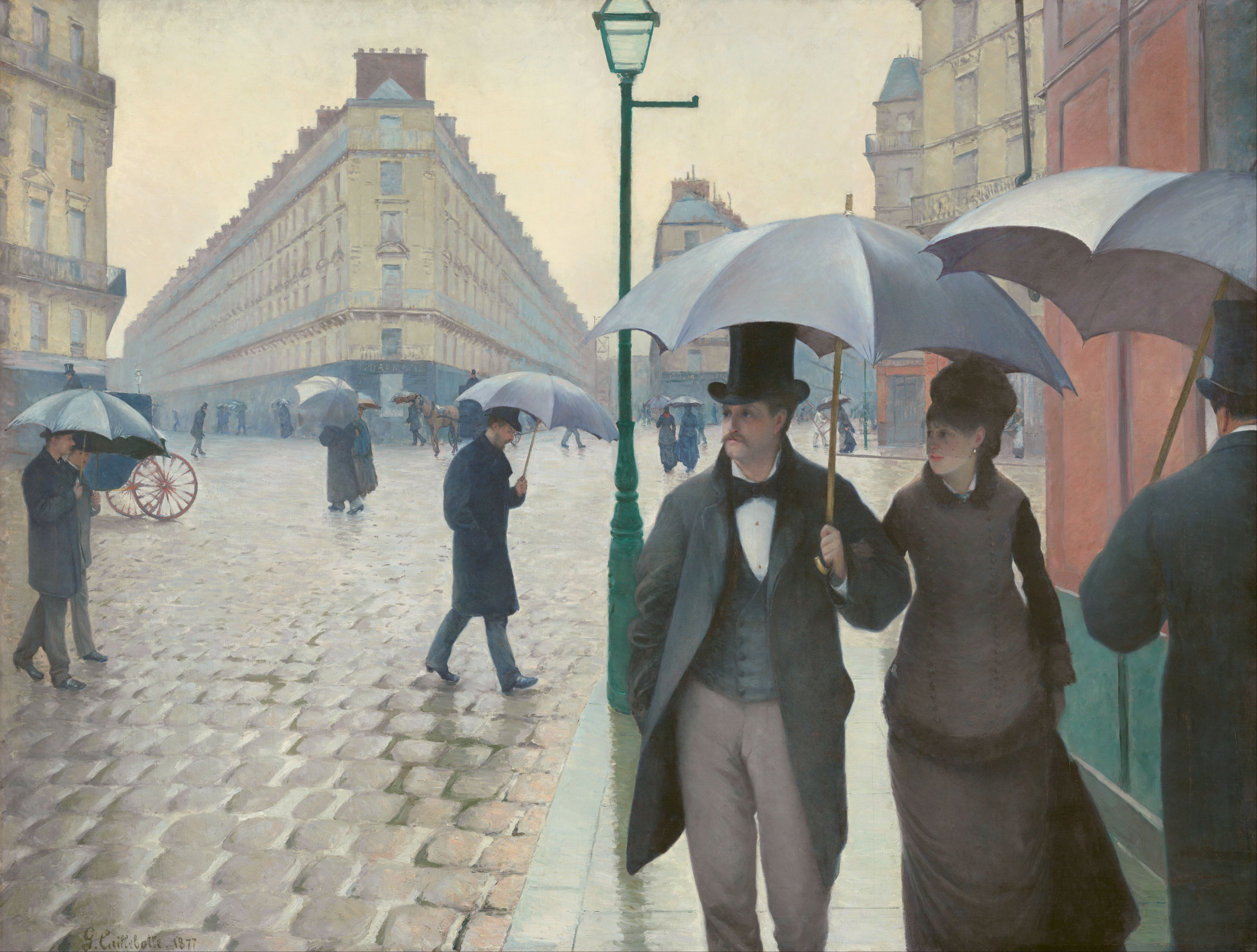
Gustave Caillebotte. Paris Street, Rainy Day (1877), Art Institute of Chicago

Caillebotte is best known for his paintings of urban Paris, such as The Europe Bridge (Le Pont de l'Europe, 1876), and Paris Street; Rainy Day (Rue de Paris ; temps de pluie, also known as La Place de l'Europe, temps de pluie, 1877). The latter is almost unique among his works for its particularly flat colors and photo-realistic effect, which give the painting its distinctive and modern look, almost akin to American Realists such as Edward Hopper. Many of his urban paintings were quite controversial due to their exaggerated, plunging perspective. In Man on a Balcony (1880), he invites the viewer to share the balcony with his subject and join in observing the scene of the city reaching into the distance, again by using unusual perspective. Showing little allegiance to any one style, many of Caillebotte's other urban paintings produced in the same period, such as The Place Saint-Augustin (1877), are considerably more impressionistic.

Caillebotte's still life paintings focus primarily on food, some at table ready to be eaten and some ready to be purchased, as in a series of paintings he made of meat at a butcher shop. He also produced some floral still-life paintings, particularly in the 1890s. Rounding out his subject matter, he painted a few nudes, including Homme au bain (1884) and Nude on a Couch (1882), which, although provocative in its realism, is ambivalent in its mood—neither overtly erotic nor suggestive of mythology themes common to many nude paintings of women during that era.

== Later life ==
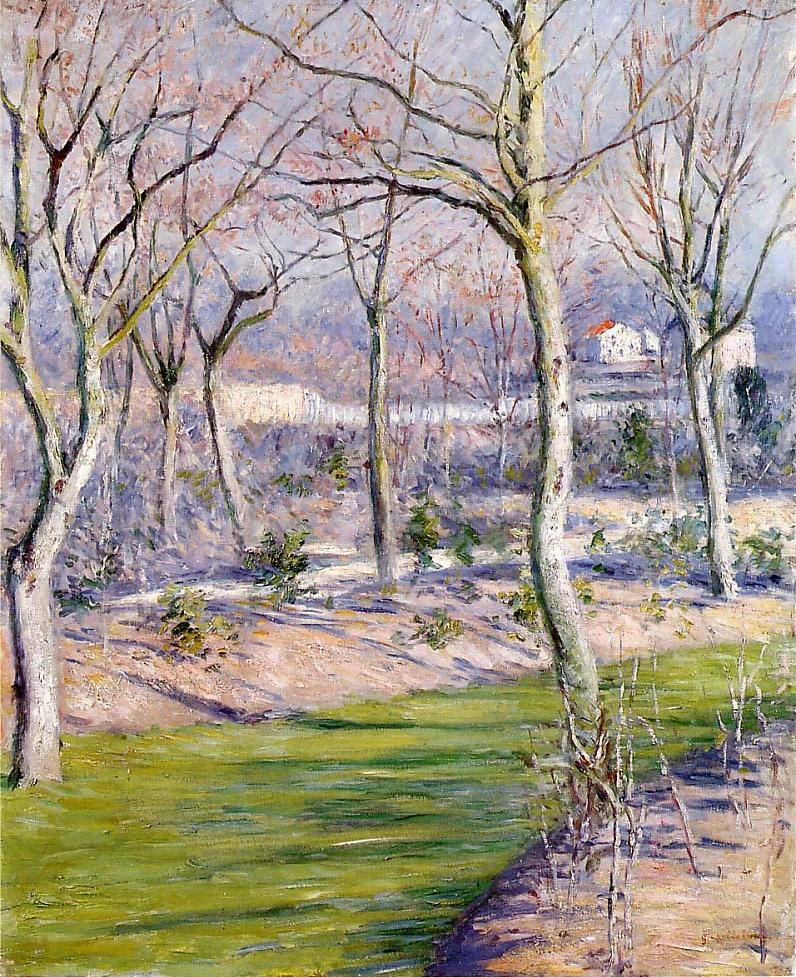
Le jardin du Petit Gennevilliers en hiver (1894), private collection

In 1881, Caillebotte acquired a property at Petit-Gennevilliers, on the banks of the Seine near Argenteuil. His brother Martial married in 1887, and Gustave moved to the Petit-Gennevilliers property permanently in 1888. Caillebotte's property had a shipyard for him to design his own yachts. The move also put him in proximity to regattas and he won several races with his boat, Roastbeef. He ceased showing his work at age 34 and devoted himself to gardening and to building and racing yachts, and he spent much time with his brother, Martial, and his friend Auguste Renoir. Renoir often came to stay at Petit-Gennevilliers, and engaged in far-ranging discussions on art, politics, literature, and philosophy. Caillebotte was a model for Renoir's 1881 painting, Luncheon of the Boating Party. Although he never married, Caillebotte appears to have had a serious relationship with Charlotte Berthier, a woman eleven years his junior and of the lower class, to whom he left a sizeable annuity.

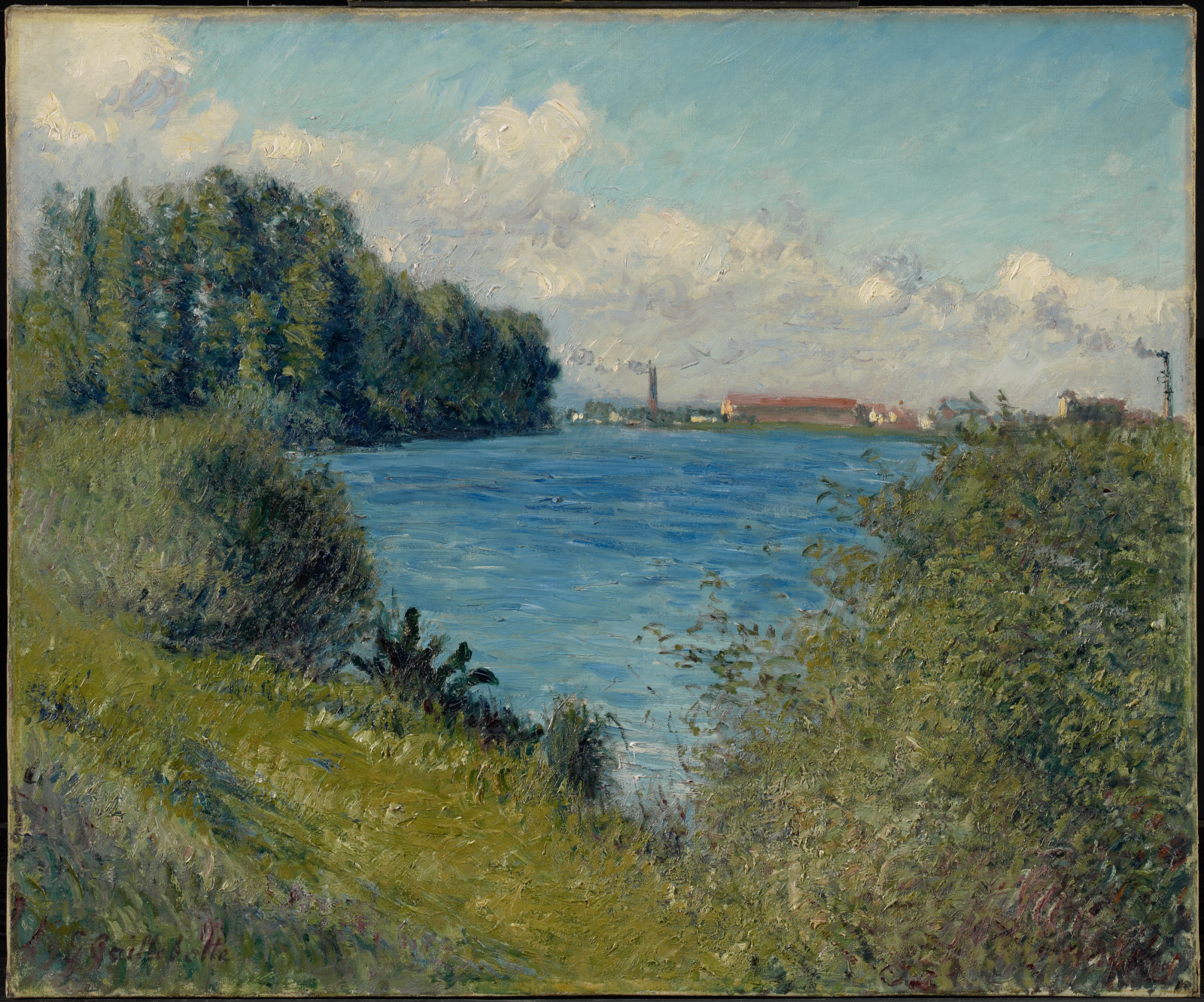
Gustave Caillebotte, The Seine at Argenteuil, c. 1892, oil on canvas. Clark Art Institute, gift of George Heard Hamilton and Polly W Hamilton.

While Caillebotte was known for his urban and domestic scenes, he also painted many rural scenes of the area around his home in the years before his death. His work had shifted to en plein air works of landscape painting, especially river scenes.

Caillebotte is most well-known for smoothly executing depictions of the surroundings of Paris with realism, in the 1870s and 1880s. His painting career slowed dramatically in the early 1890s when he stopped working on large canvases. Caillebotte died of pulmonary congestion while working in his garden at Petit-Gennevilliers in 1894 at age 45. He was interred at Père Lachaise Cemetery in Paris.

For many years, and partly because he never had to sell his work to support himself, Caillebotte's reputation as a painter was overshadowed by his recognition as a supporter of the arts. Seventy years after his death, however, art historians began reevaluating his artistic contributions. His striking use of varying perspective sets him apart from his peers who may have otherwise surpassed him. His art was largely forgotten until the 1950s when his relatives began to sell the family collection. In 1964, the Art Institute of Chicago acquired Paris Street; Rainy Day, spurring American interest in him. By the 1970s, his works were being exhibited again and critically reassessed. Even as late as the 1970s Caillebotte's place in the history of art was tenuous.

At the 100th anniversary of his death in 1994, a major retrospective of his work traveled to Galeries nationales du Grand Palais in Paris (16 September 1994 – 9 January 1995), Art Institute of Chicago (18 February – 28 May 1995), Los Angeles County Museum of Art (10 June – September 10, 1995). It marked the first comprehensive (117 works, including 89 paintings) international retrospective exhibition of his work. The National Gallery of Art (Washington, D.C.) and the Kimbell Art Museum (Fort Worth, Texas) organized a major retrospective titled "Gustave Caillebotte: The Painter's Eye" of Caillebotte's painting for exhibition in 2015–2016.

== Patron and collector ==
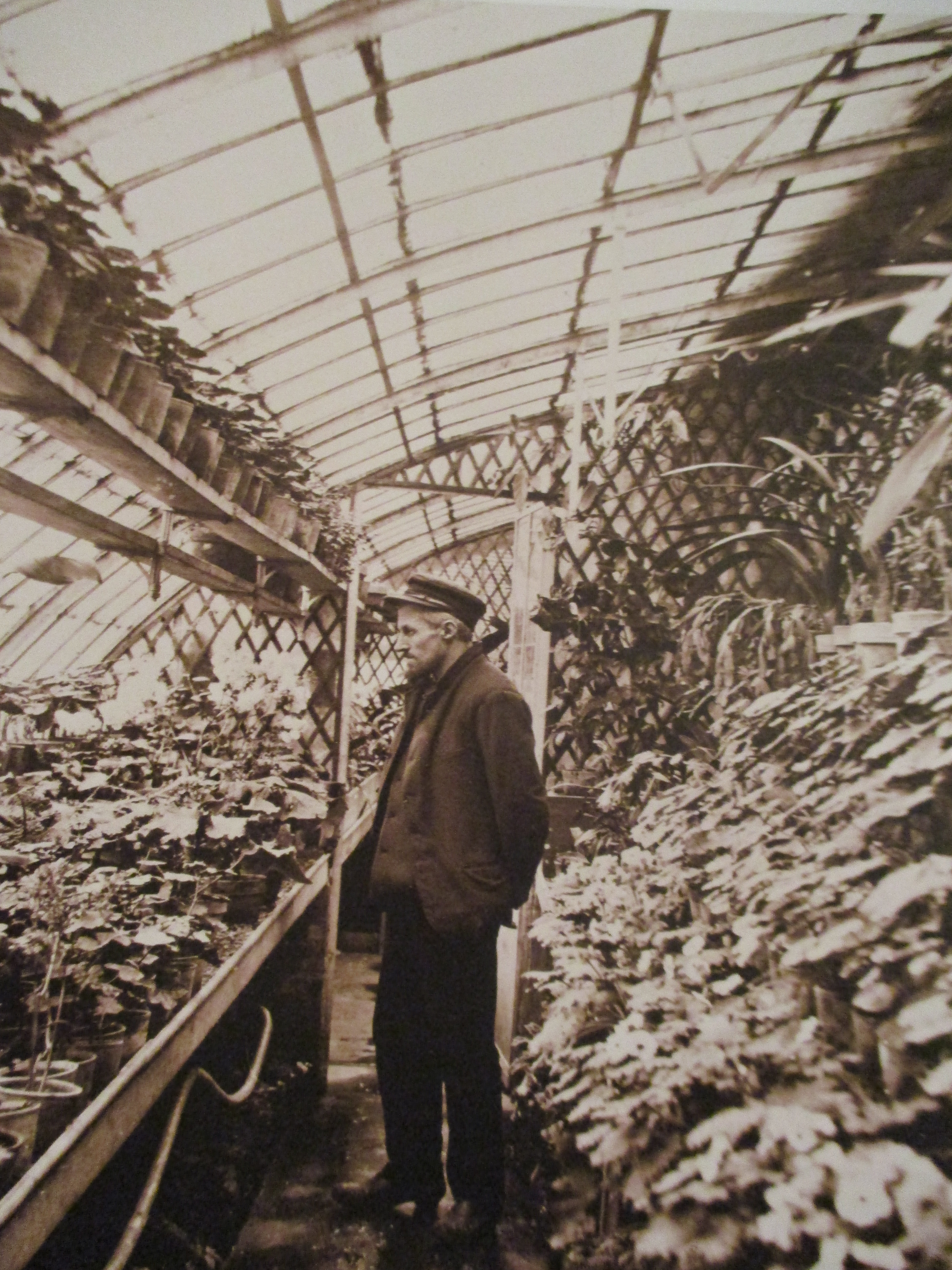
Caillebotte in his greenhouse (February 1892), Petit Gennevilliers

Caillebotte's sizable allowance, along with the parental inheritance he received, allowed him to paint without the pressure to sell his work. It also allowed him to help fund Impressionist exhibitions and support his fellow artists and friends (Claude Monet, Auguste Renoir, and Camille Pissarro, among others) by purchasing their works and, at least in the case of Monet, paying the rent for their studios.

Caillebotte bought his first Monet in 1875 and was especially helpful to that artist's career and financial survival. He was precise in his sponsorship; notably absent are works by Georges Seurat and Paul Gauguin, or any of the Symbolists. In 1890, he played a major role in assisting Claude Monet to organize a public subscription and persuade the French state to purchase Édouard Manet's Olympia (1863).

== 2024 Exhibition at Musée d'Orsay ==
In 2022, France acquired Boating Party and unveiled it in 2023. In 2024, the French Ministry of Culture organized a national celebration of the acquisition to coincide with the 150th anniversary of impressionism and the 130th anniversary of Caillebotte's death. The celebration began with a special display of the work in the Musée d'Orsay's impressionism gallery, followed by a national tour of the work, and then its inclusion in a major Caillebotte exhibition at the Musée d'Orsay alongside other Caillebotte masterpieces. Boating Party toured the country being presented by Rima Abdul Malak at Museum of Fine Arts of Lyon (9 September 2023 – 11 December 2023), displayed at Musée des beaux-arts de Marseille (15 December 2023 – 17 March 2024) and then exhibited at Fine Arts Museum of Nantes (March 23, 2024 to June 23, 2024). The Nantes exhibition coincided with both the Musée d'Orsay's 150th anniversary impressionism exhibition (26 March – 14 July 2024) and its simultaneous celebration of loaning 180 works to 30 different museums throughout France. This was the first time that a National Treasure had been put on a national tour like this.

In 2024 the Musée d'Orsay hosted an exhibition examining how Gustave Caillebotte depicted men in unconventional ways, hinting at his possible homosexuality. The exhibition's introductory texts highlight how Caillebotte portrayed men in domestic, often intimate settings typically reserved for women in the 19th century. His male subjects are shown with striking realism in everyday activities—bathing, rowing, lounging, and even defecating. A curator remarked on the radical nature of his work: "His subject matter is very radical during the time, because men were not supposed to stare at men, and he's staring at men". During his career, 100 of his paintings depicted only men, while just 32 depicted only women, an emphasis that was unique among his French contemporaries. Most of his male subjects are from high society. However, this bias of the Orsay exhibition has been disputed by some art critics in French newspapers, such as by Harry Bellet in Le Monde.

The tour was titled as "Gustave Caillebotte: Painting Men" at Musée d'Orsay (8 October 2024 – 19 January 2025) and its subsequent appearance at J. Paul Getty Museum (25 February – 25 May 2025). The show traveled to the Art Institute of Chicago (29 June – 5 October 2025) as "Gustave Caillebotte: Painting His World". The only change in the exhibition was that Caillebotte's pastels were only included in Paris because of their fragility. The subsequent legs of the exhibition included Young Man Playing the Piano (1876), on loan from Tokyo's Artizon Museum.

== Other interests ==
In addition, Caillebotte used his wealth to fund hobbies for which he was quite passionate, including stamp collecting, orchid growing, yacht building, and even textile design. The women in his paintings Madame Boissière Knitting (1877) and Portrait of Madame Caillebotte (1877) may be working on patterns created by Caillebotte. After his death, he was inscribed in the Roll of Distinguished Philatelists and the collection he amassed together with his brother Martial is now in the British Library.

== Caillebotte's collection ==
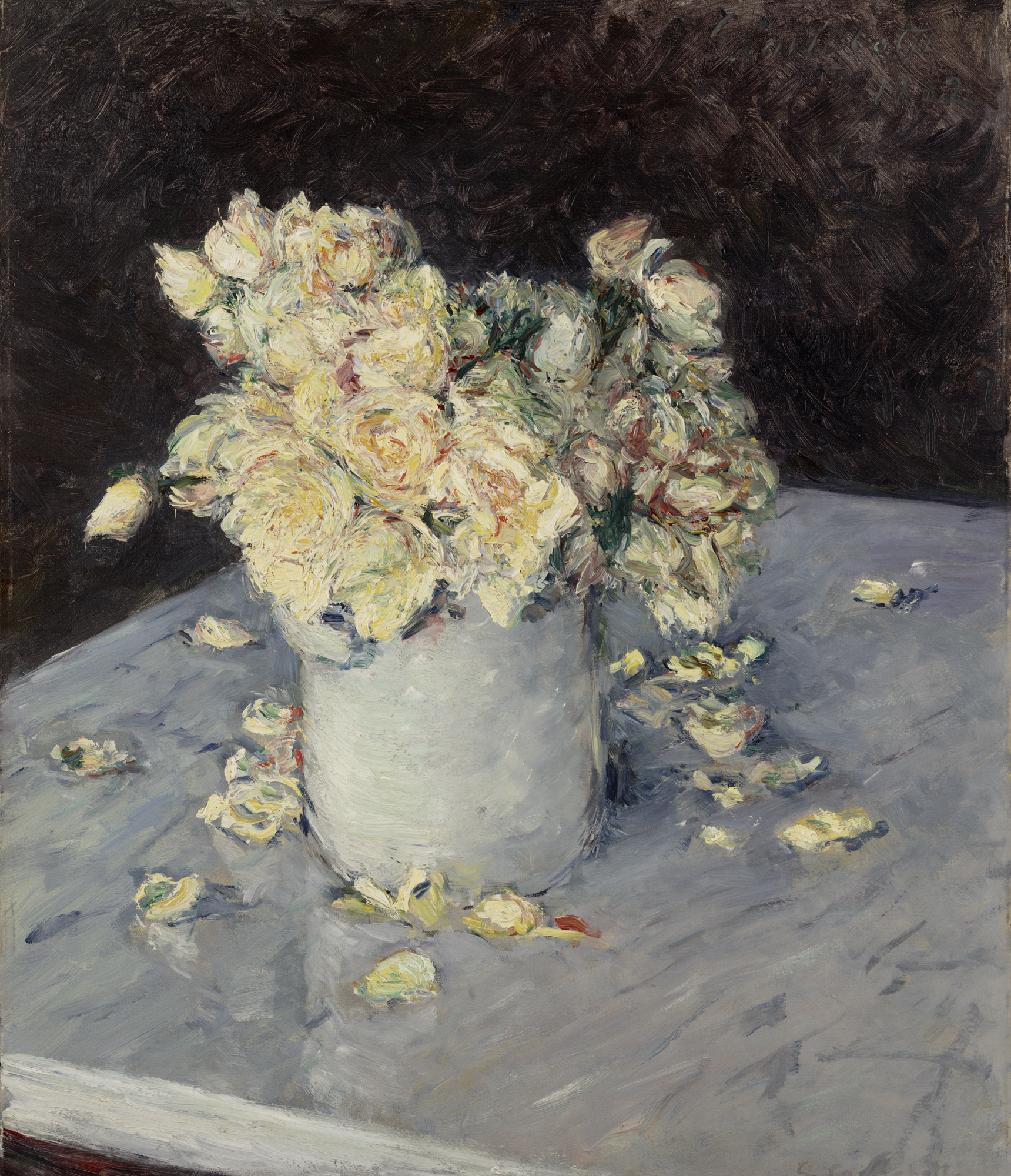
Caillebotte's own Yellow Roses in a Vase 1882, Dallas Museum of Art

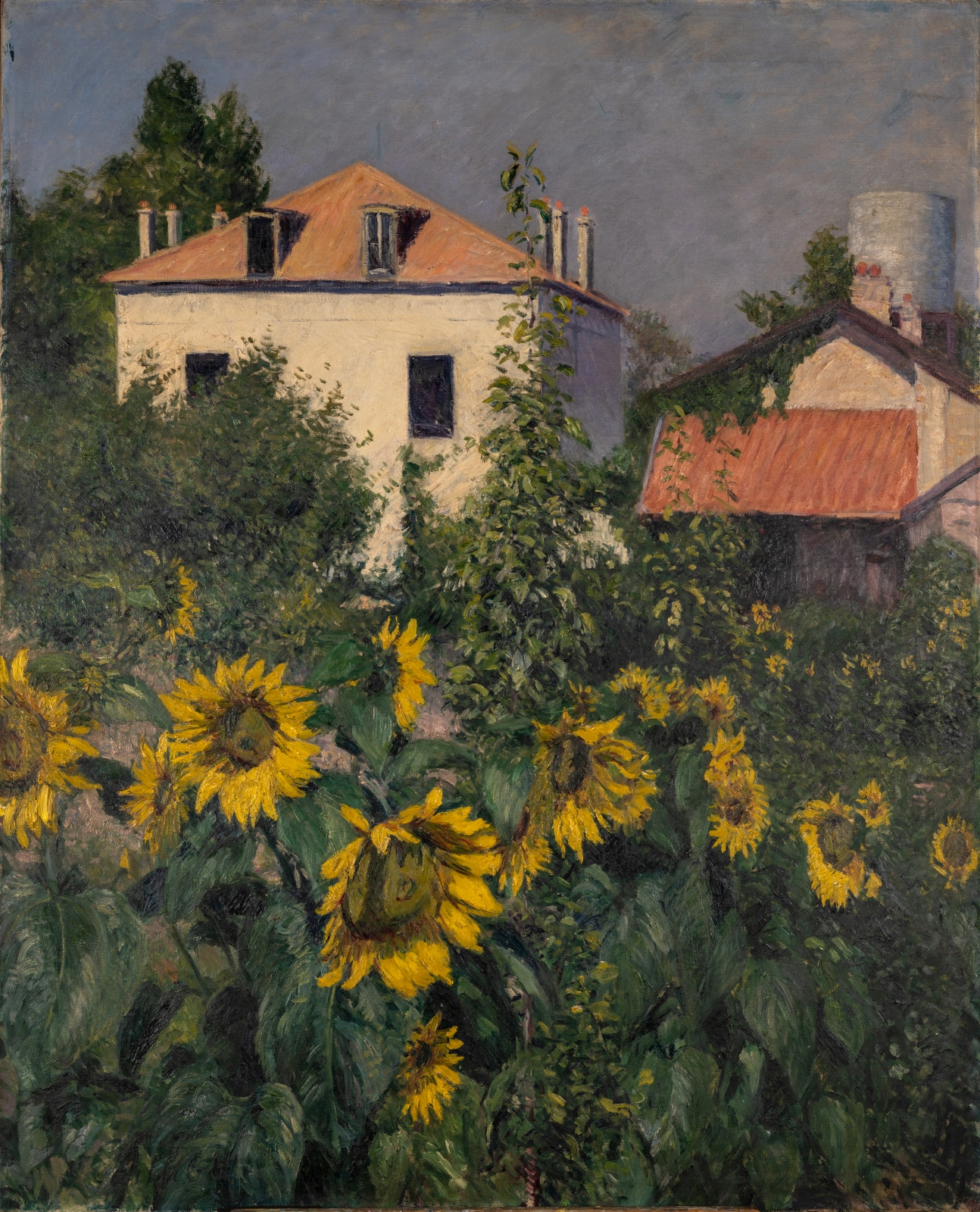
Les Soleils, jardin du petit Gennevilliers by Caillebotte 1885, Musée d'Orsay acquisition 2022

Convinced after the death in 1876 of his younger brother René that his own life would be short, Caillebotte wrote his will while still in his twenties. In the will, Caillebotte bequeathed a large collection to the French government. This collection of sixty-eight paintings, included works by Camille Pissarro (nineteen), Claude Monet (fourteen), Pierre-Auguste Renoir (ten), Alfred Sisley (nine), Edgar Degas (seven), Paul Cézanne (five), and Édouard Manet (four). At the time of the bequest, Martial also donated Les raboteurs de parquet because the bequest did not include any of Gustave's own works.

At the time of Caillebotte's death, the Impressionists were still largely condemned by the art establishment in France, which remained dominated by Academic art and specifically, the Académie des Beaux-Arts. Because of this, Caillebotte realised that the cultural treasures in his collection would likely disappear into "attics" and "provincial museums". He therefore stipulated that they must be displayed in the Luxembourg Palace (devoted to the work of living artists), and then in the Louvre. The French government would not agree to these terms. In February 1896, they finally negotiated terms with Renoir, who was the executor of the will, under which they took thirty-eight of the paintings to the Luxembourg Palace. The installation constituted the first presentation of the Impressionists in a public venue in France. Among the works included were Impression, Sunrise, The Poppy Field near Argenteuil and an element of the Gare Saint-Lazare series by Monet, The Ballet Class by Degas, The Railway by Manet, Bal du moulin de la Galette and The Swing by Renoir and Une loge aux Théâtre Italiens by Eva Gonzalès. The works were unveiled in the Caillebotte room at the Musée du Luxembourg in February 1897, bolstering the standing of Impressionism with the first presentation of the Impressionists in a public venue in France. The bequest intended for the works to make their way to the collection at the Louvre. However, the Louvre's collection of French art from the mid 1800s to the early 1900s was moved to the Musée d'Orsay. During the 2024 150th anniversary of Impressionism and 130th anniversary of Caillebotte's death this collection, which is usually scattered throughout the Musee d'Orsay, was brought together for an exhibition from 8 October 2024 to 19 January 2025, simultaneously to the Caillebotte exhibition's run at the museum.

The remaining 29 paintings (one by Degas was taken by Renoir in payment for his services as executor) were offered to the French government twice again, in 1904 and 1908, and were both times refused. When the government finally attempted to claim them in 1928, the bequest was repudiated by the widow of Caillebotte's brother Martial Caillebotte. One of the remaining works, Bathers at Rest, was purchased by Albert C. Barnes and is now held by the Barnes Foundation. In 2019 the Daurelle bequest of three paintings and two pastels was accepted by the Musee d'Orsay. The museum recently acquired Les Soleils, jardin du petit Genevilliers by Caillebotte on the basis that this painting is of high artistic and historical value for the Impressionist gallery of the Musée d'Orsay.

== Acquisitions ==
His Man on a Balcony, Boulevard Haussmann (French: Homme au balcon, boulevard Haussmann, 1880), sold for more than US$14.3 million ($26.7 million in 2025) in 2000.

In 2011, Museum of Fine Arts, Boston acquired Homme au bain for $17 million ($24.3 million in 2025), marking the museum's second Caillebotte. In February 2011, a record for his work was established at $18 million ($25.8 million in 2025). In 2018, Marie-Jeanne Daurelle, the great-granddaughter of Caillebotte's butler, Jean Daurelle, bequeathed 3 paintings (2 of Daurelle) and 2 pastels (depicting her grandfather, Camille, as a child) to the Musée d'Orsay. She had not realized that the paintings were valuable until the 1994 retrospective of Caillebotte's work. The 2019 sale of Rising Road (French: Chemin montant, 1881) pushed the record for the highest price achieved for a Caillebotte work to $22 million ($27.7 million in 2025) or €19.9 (€23.4 million in 2023). Later that year, another Caillebotte work Richard Gallo et son chien Dick, au Petit-Gennevilliers (1884) sold for $19.7 ($24.8 million in 2025) or $20.8 ($26.2 million in 2025), depending on the source.

In 2021, Young Man at His Window (French: Jeune homme à sa fenêtre, a National treasure of France) was sold by the estate of Edwin L. Cox at auction at Christie's New York to the collection of the J. Paul Getty Museum in Los Angeles for $53 million ($63 million in 2025) or €48.9 million (€55.9 million in 2023), marking the Getty's first Caillebotte work.

Boating Party (French: Partie de bateau, also a National treasure of France) had been retained by Caillebotte's descendants until a donation by LVMH made it possible for the Musée d'Orsay to acquire it for $47million ($51.7 million in 2025) or €43 million (€45.3 million in 2023) in 2022. Musée d'Orsay claims to have the largest collection of impressionist works in the world. However, its 13 previous works by Caillebotte did not include any works from the part of his career where he worked on water related themes. Boating Party was described as the most important treasure acquired by the state in the history of the National Treasure program.

== Gallery ==
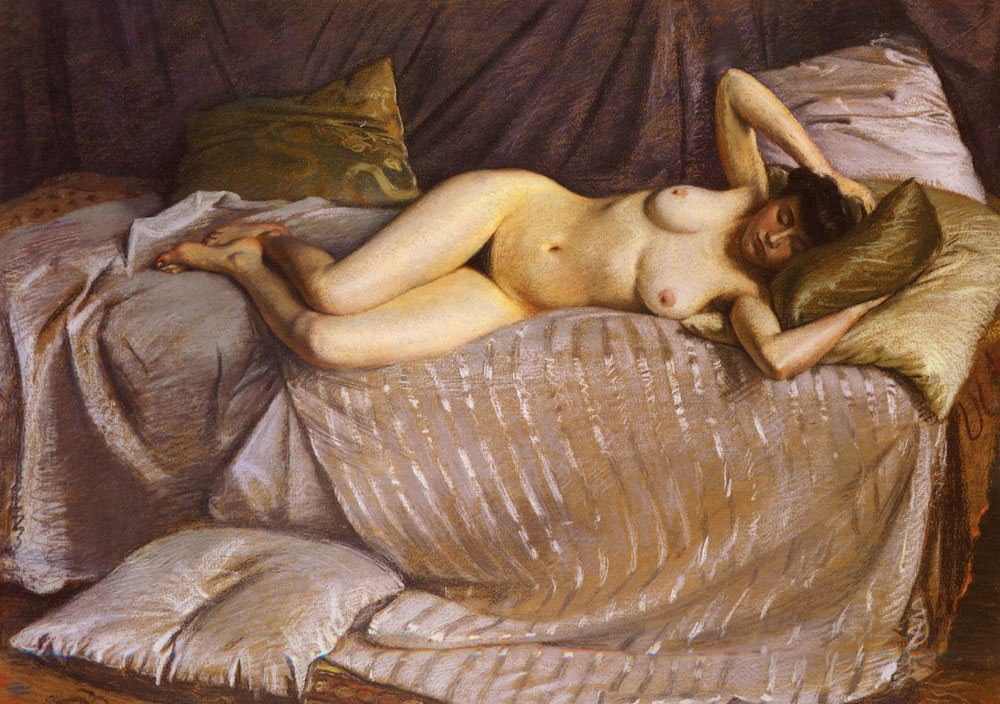
Nude Lying on a Couch (1873)
Promised gift to the
Metropolitan Museum of Art

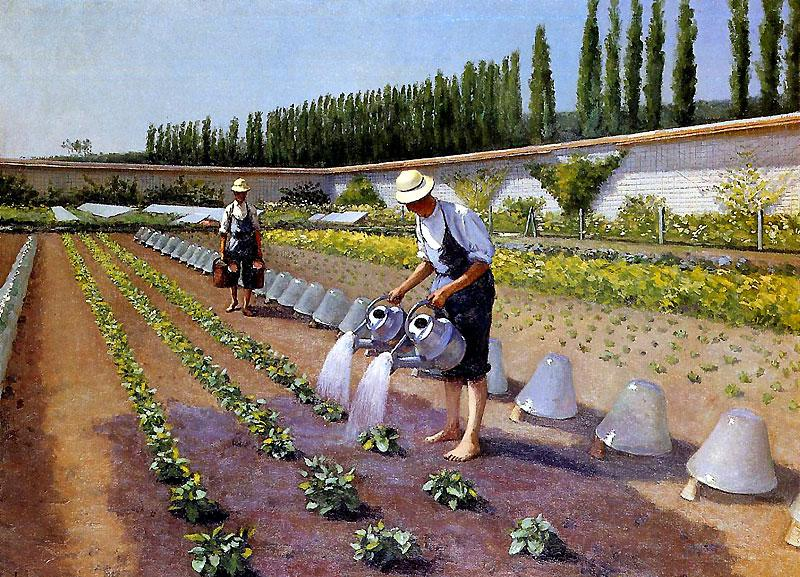
Les jardiniers (1875)
Private collection

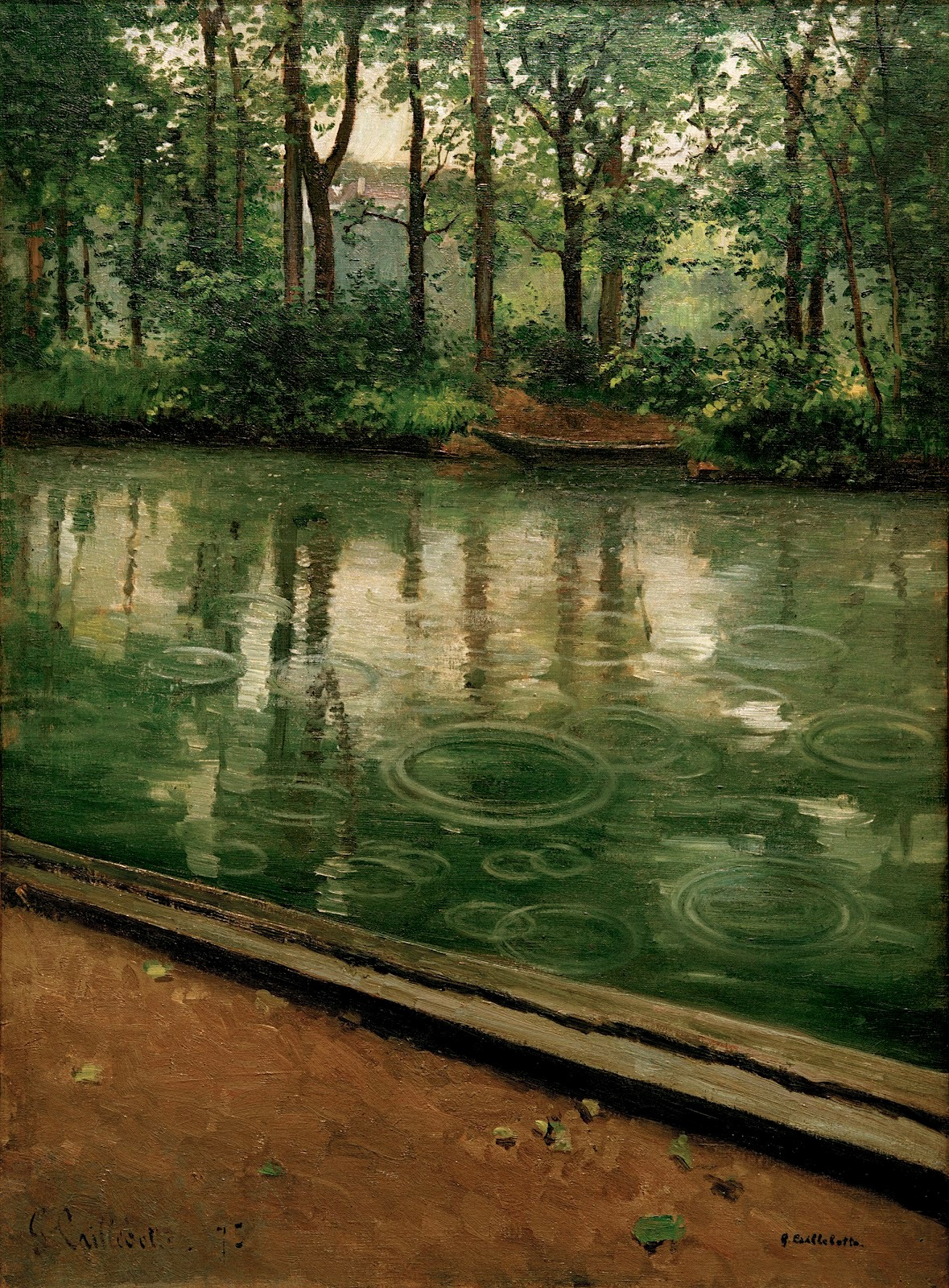
L'Yerres, effet de pluie (1875)
Eskenazi Museum of Art at Indiana University, Bloomington, Indiana

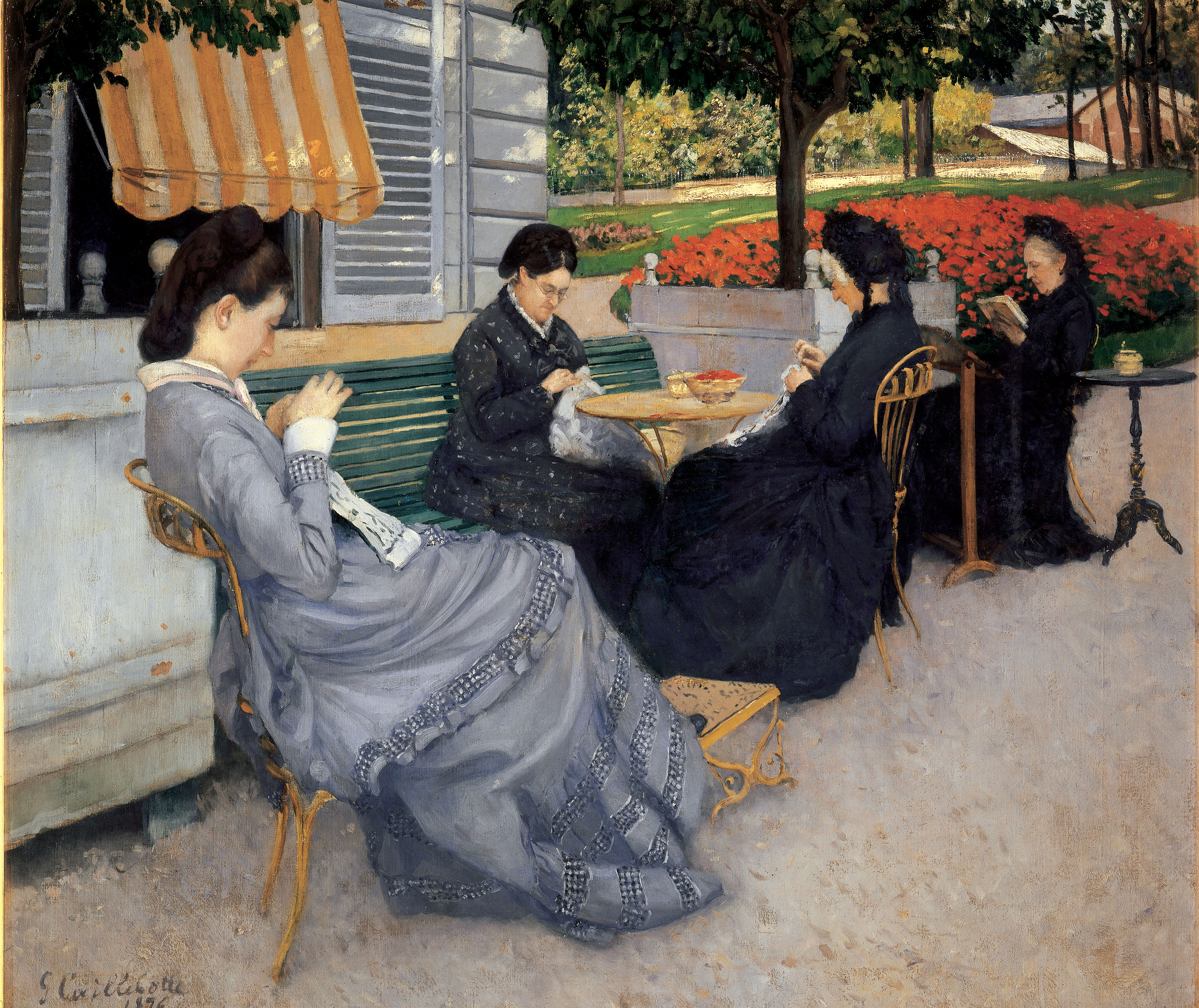
Portraits à la campagne (1876)
Musée Baron Gérard, Bayeux

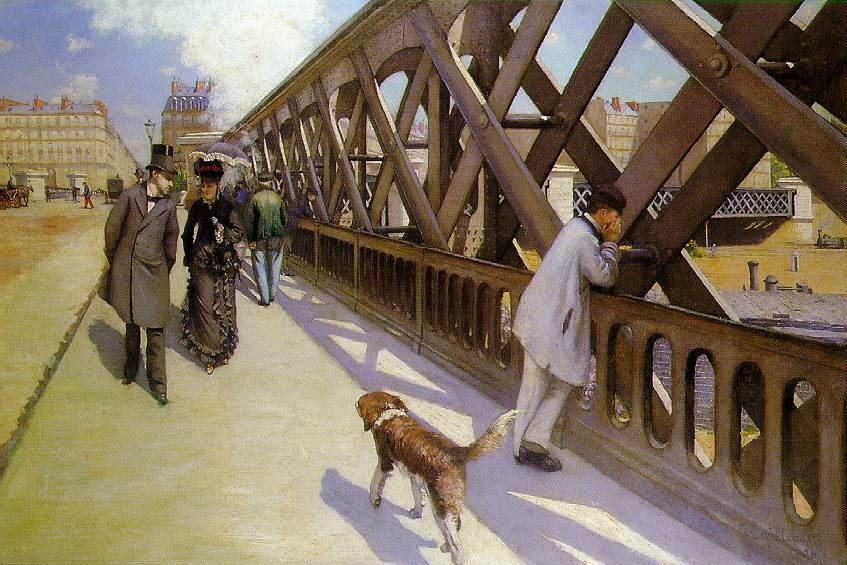
Le Pont de l'Europe (1876)
Petit Palais (Genève)

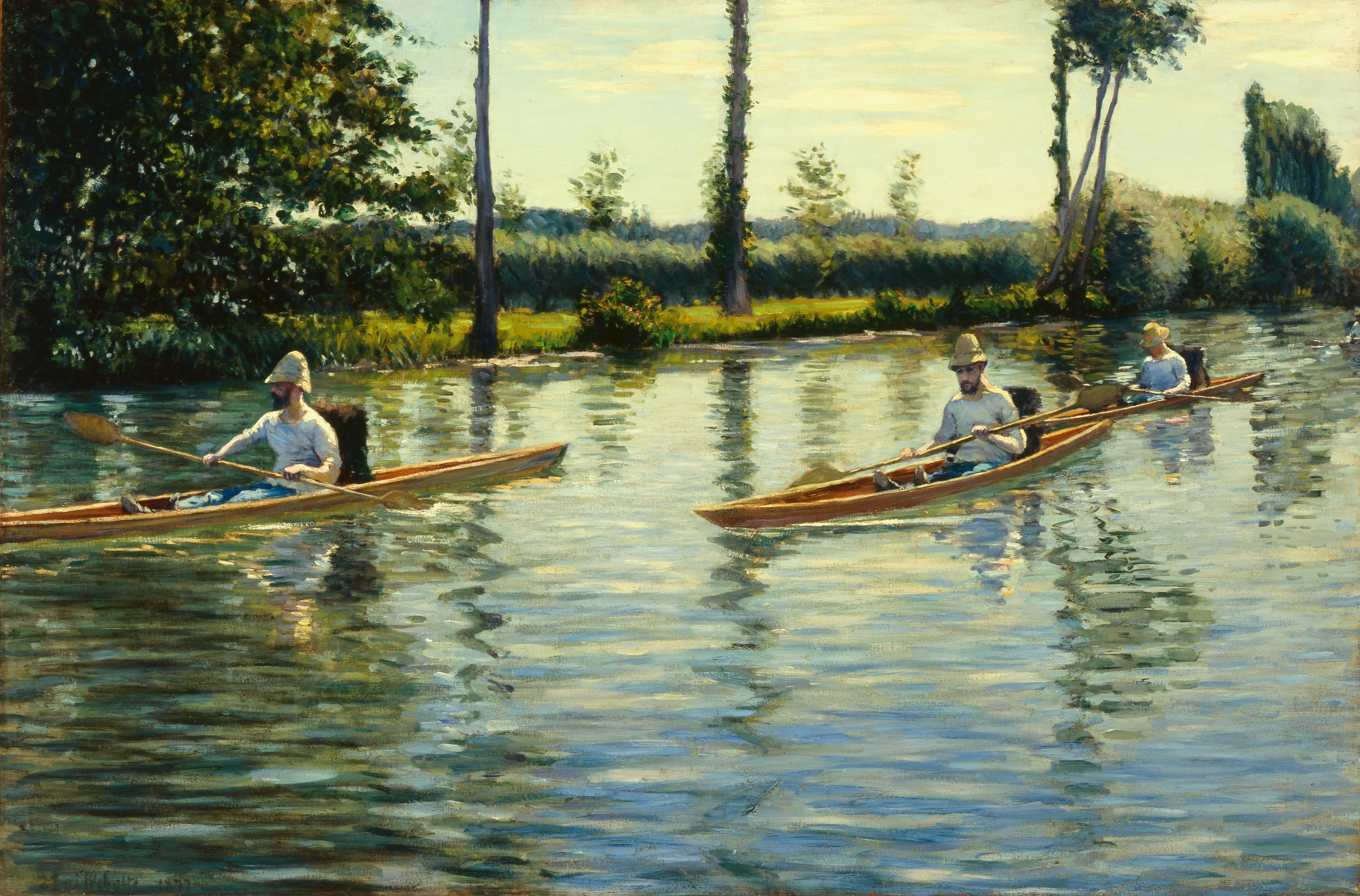
Skiffs (Périssoires) (1877)
Milwaukee Art Museum

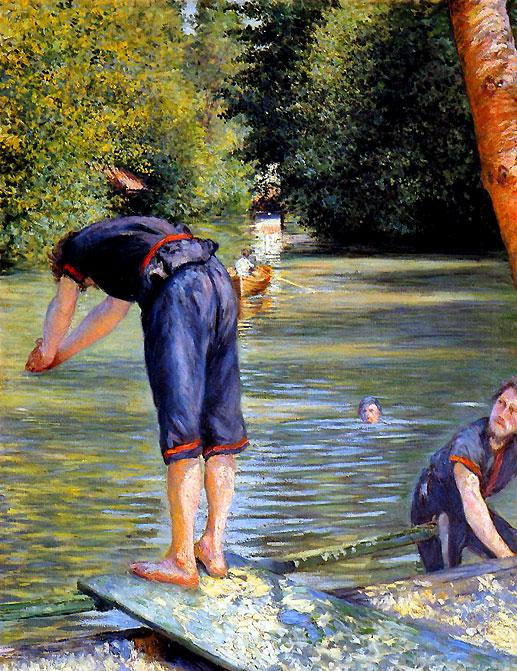
Baigneurs (1878)
Private collection

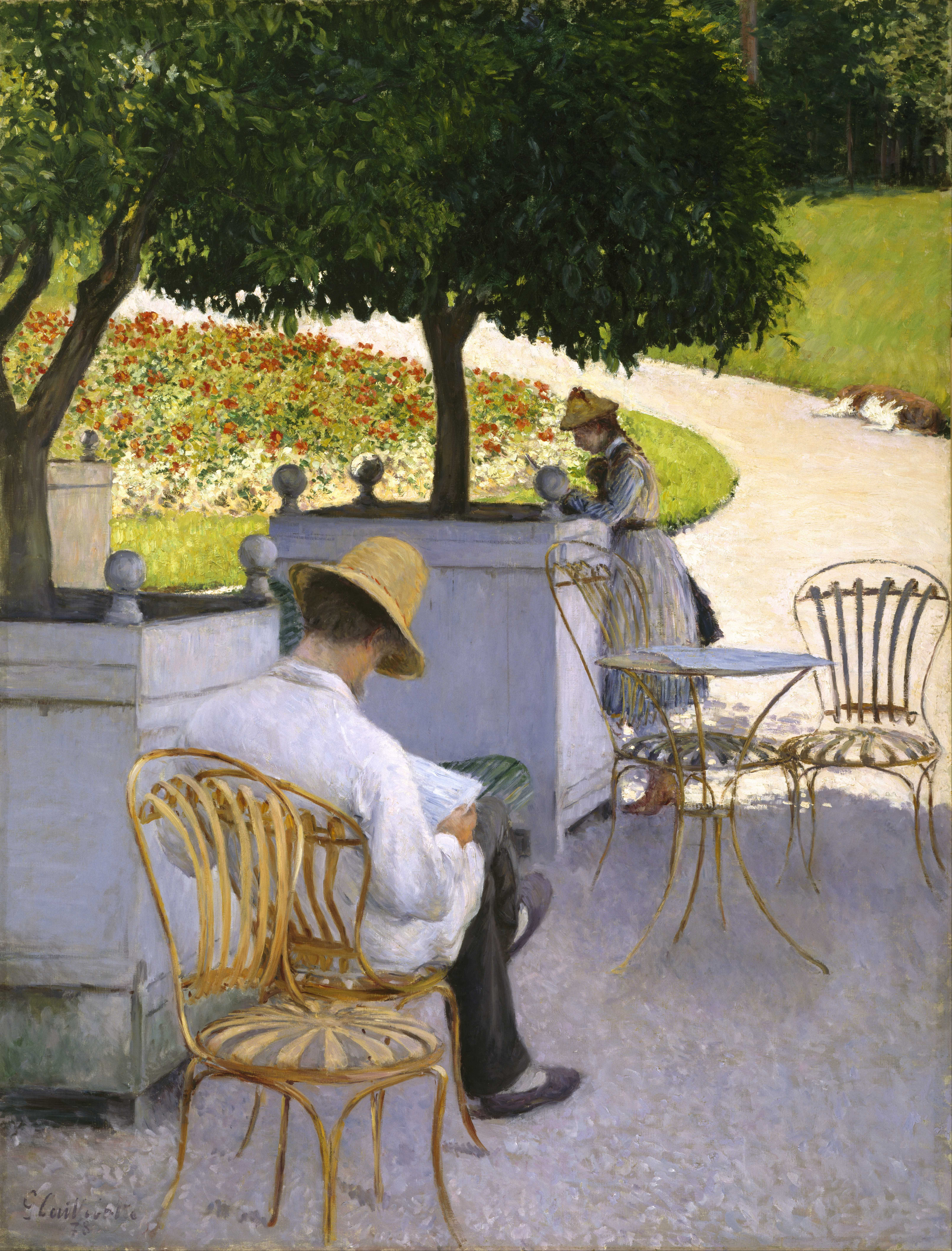
Les orangers (1878)
Museum of Fine Arts, Houston

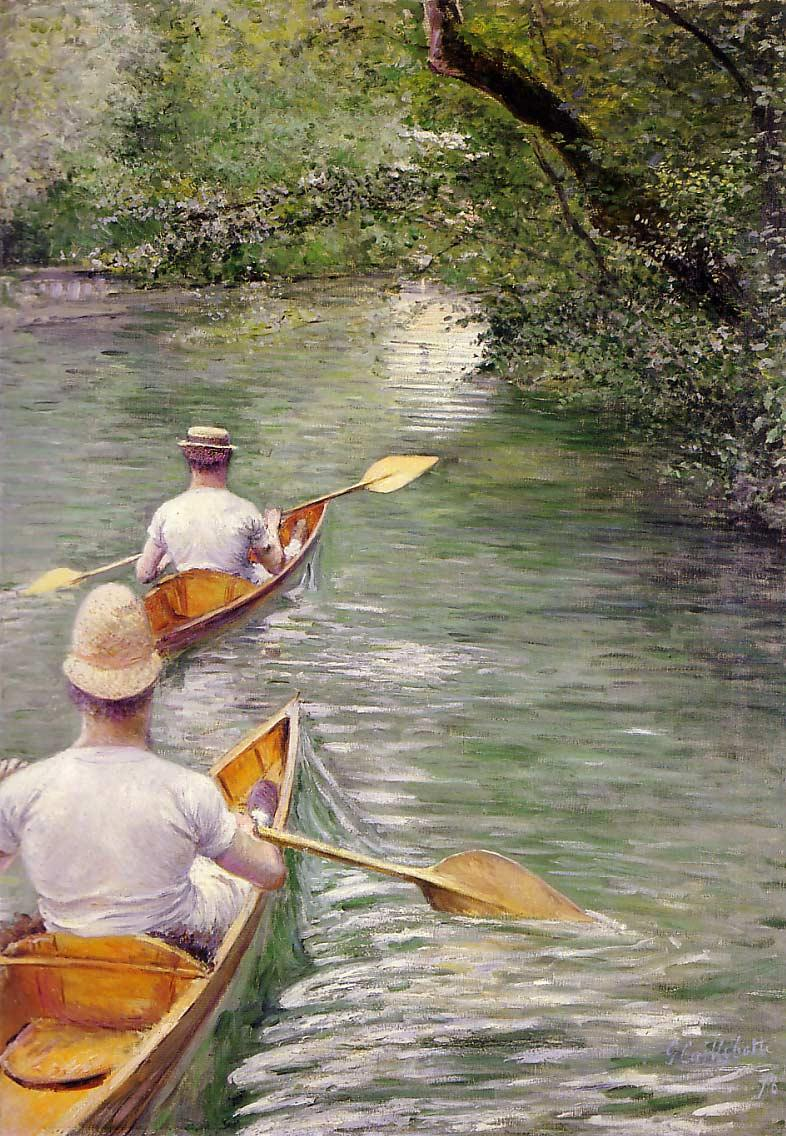
Les Périssoires (1878)
Museum of Fine Arts of Rennes

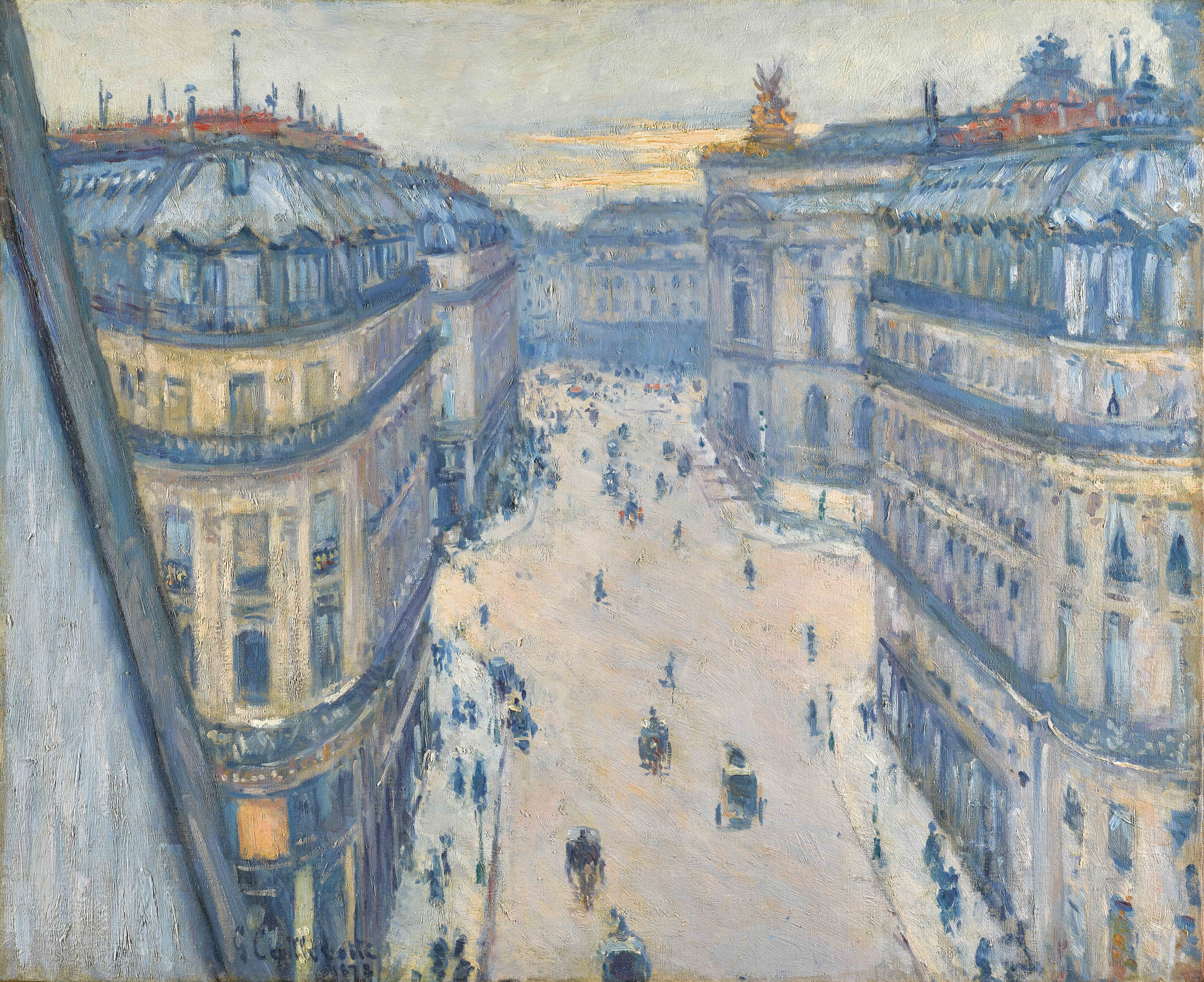
Rue Halévy, From the 6th Floor (1878), Museum Barberini, Potsdam

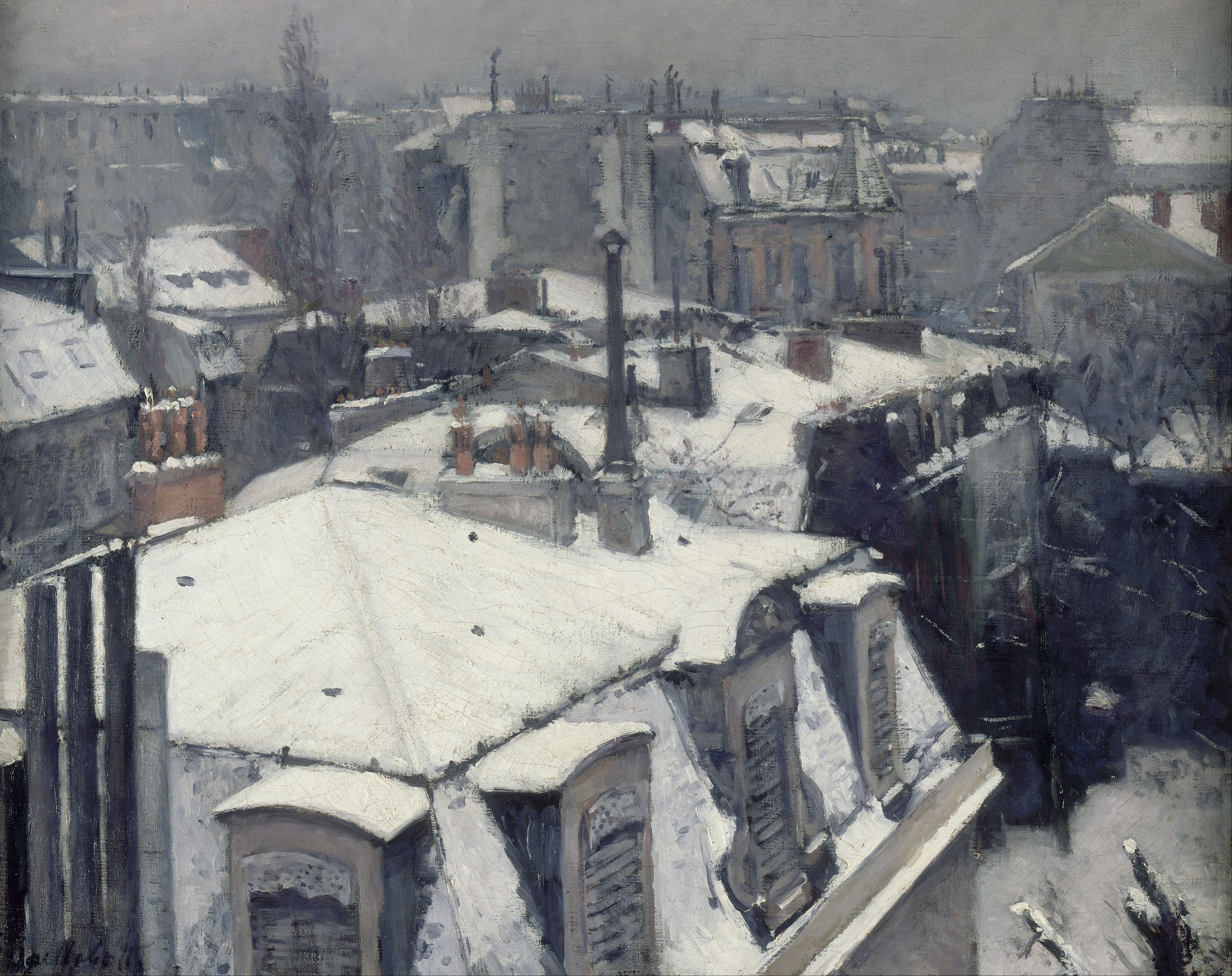
Vue de toits (Effet de neige) (1878)
Musée d'Orsay, Paris

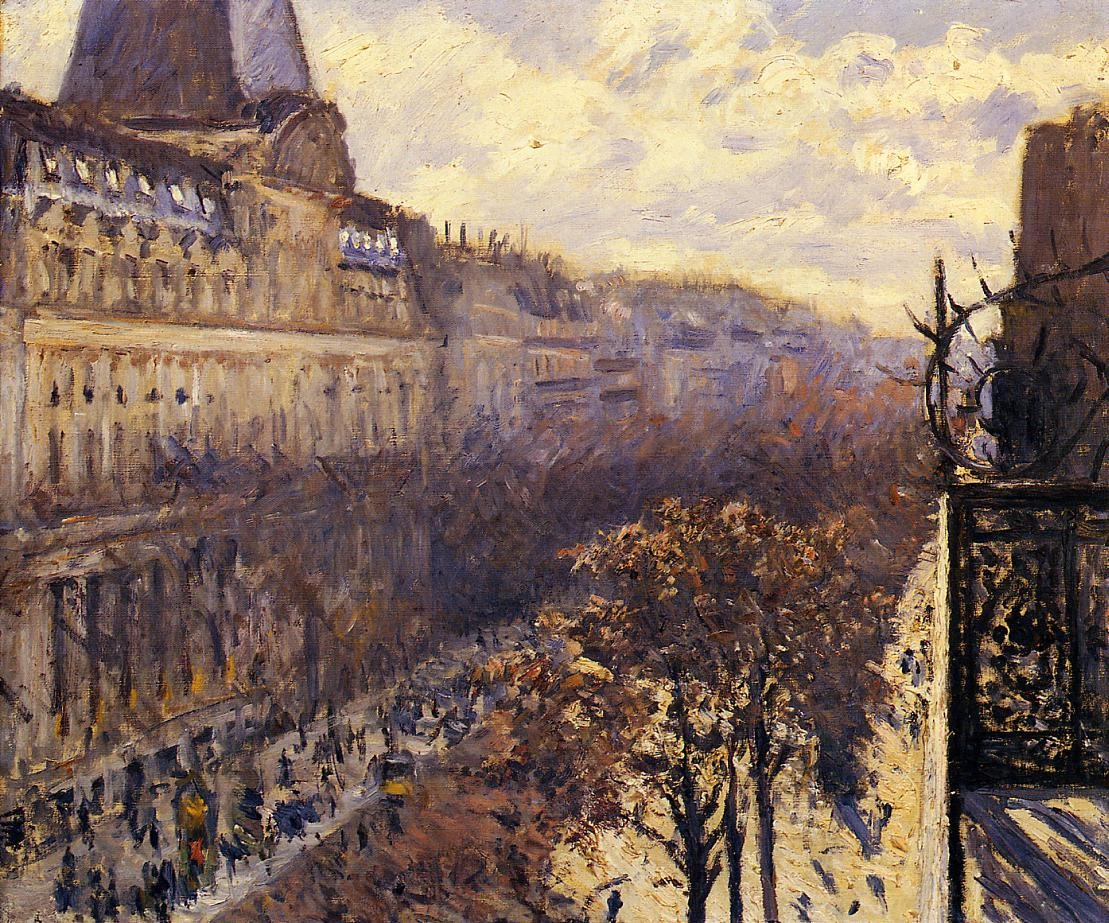
Boulevard des Italiens (1880)
Private collection

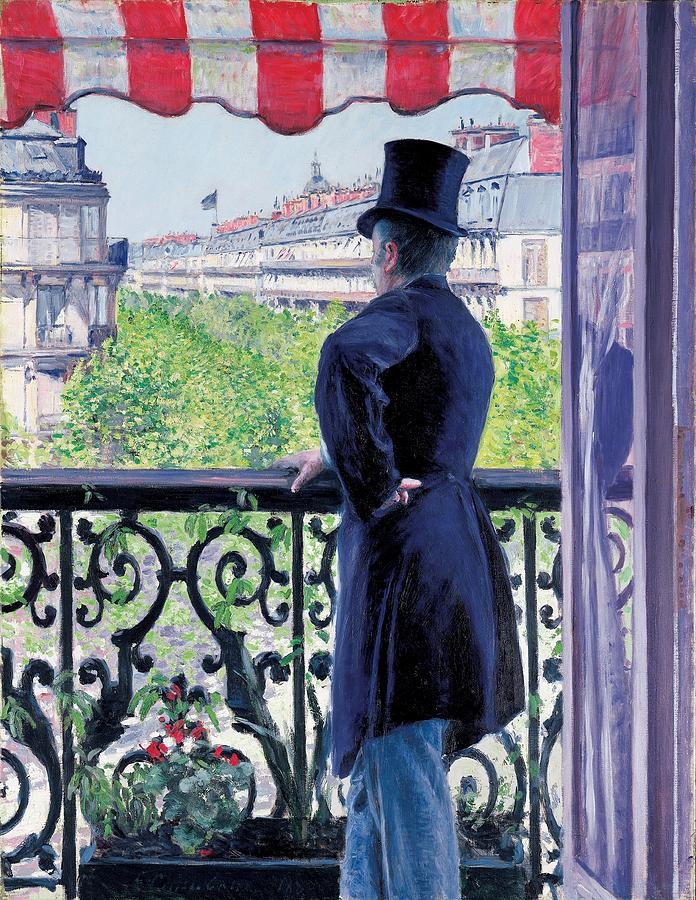
L'homme au balcon, Boulevard Haussmann (1880)

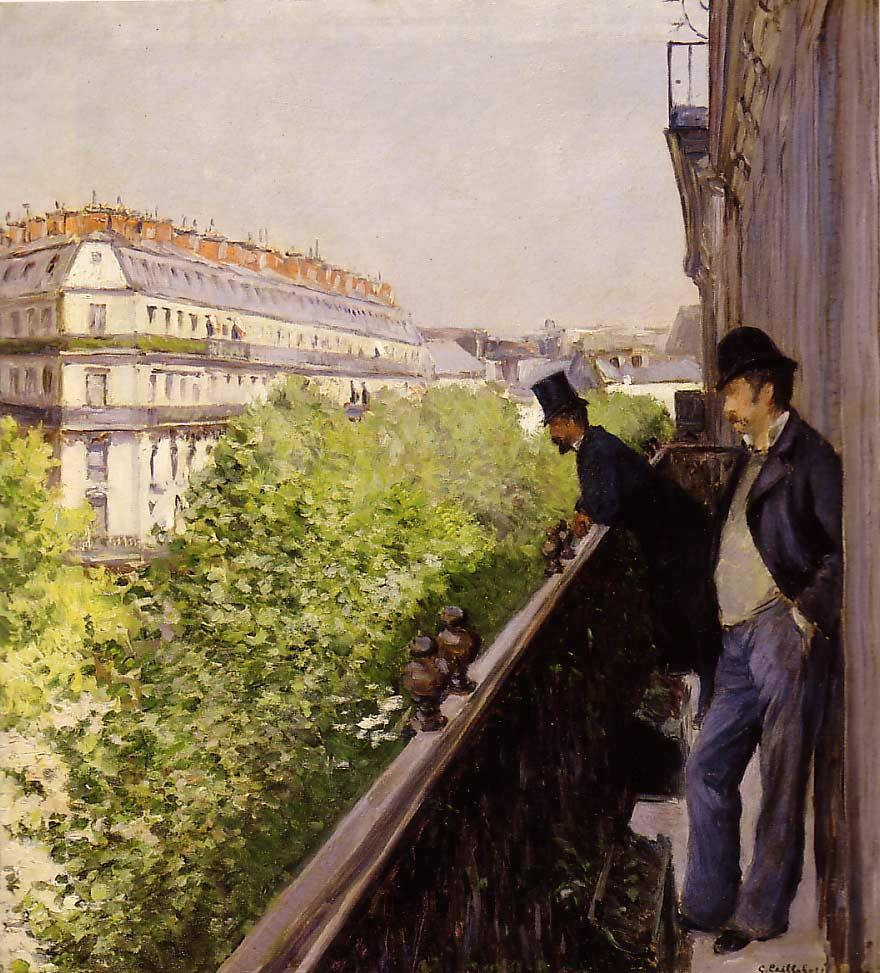
Un balcon (1880)
Private collection

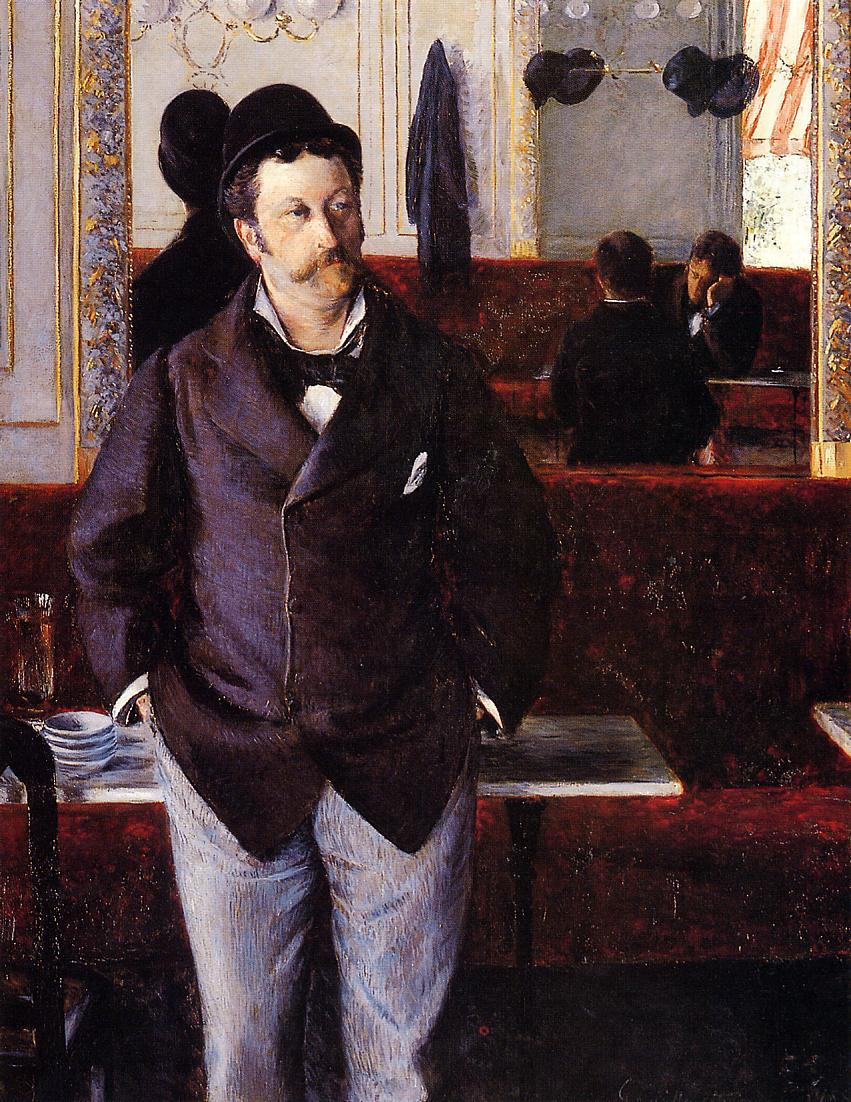
Dans un café (1880)
Musée des Beaux-Arts de Rouen

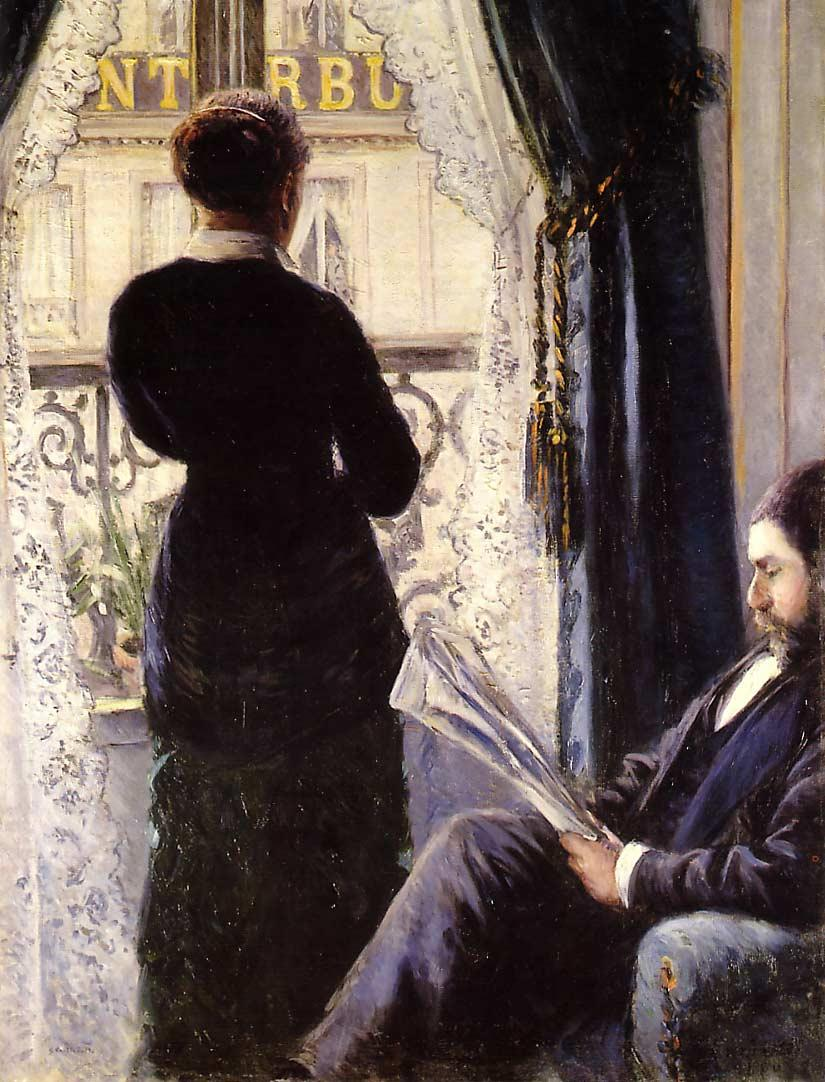
Intérieur (1880)
Private collection

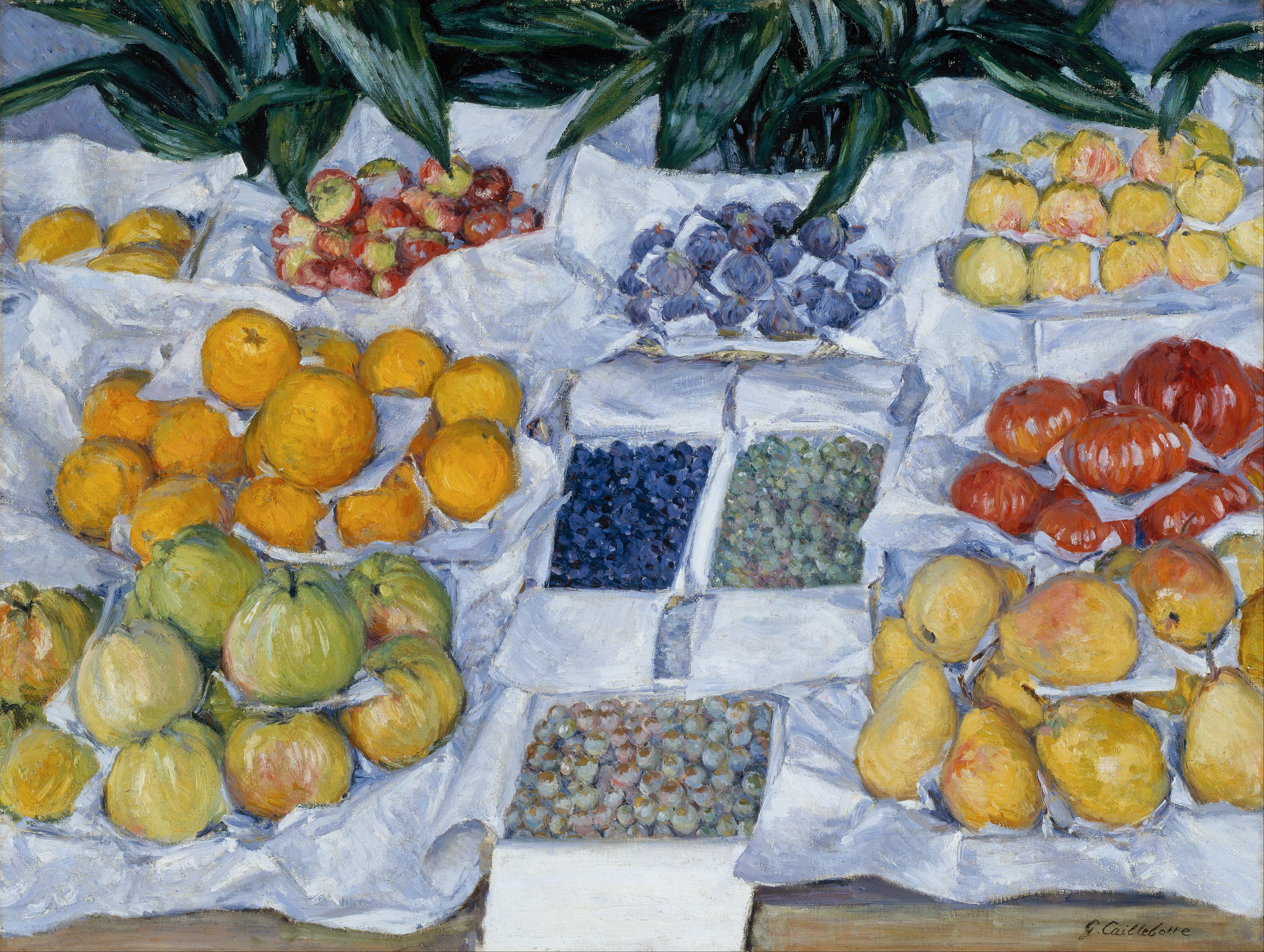
Fruits sur un étalage (1882)
Museum of Fine Arts, Boston

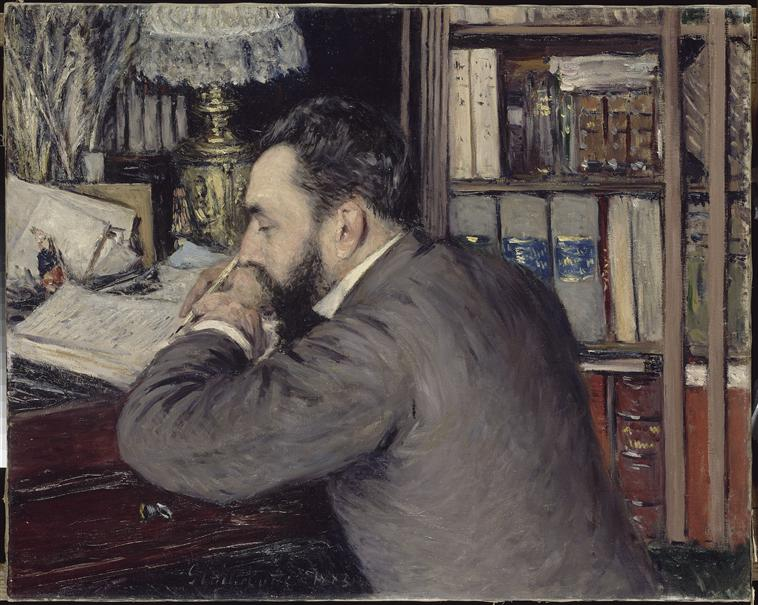
Portrait d'Henri Cordier (1883)
Musée d'Orsay, Paris

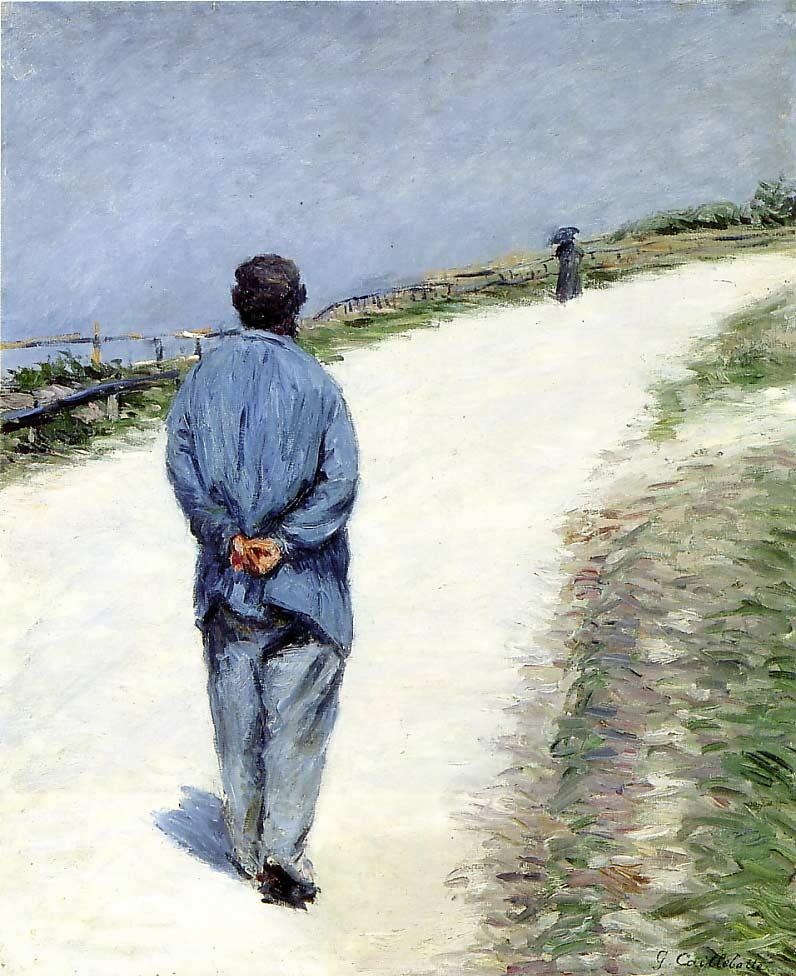
Homme portant une blouse (1884)
Private collection

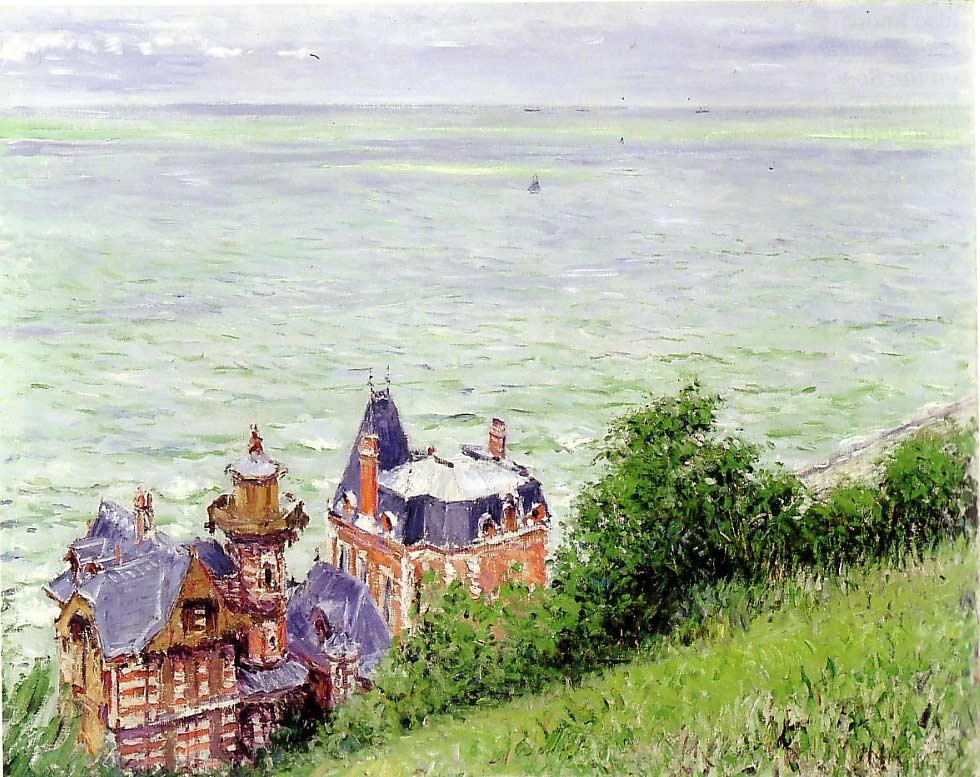
Villas à Trouville (1884)
Cleveland Museum of Art

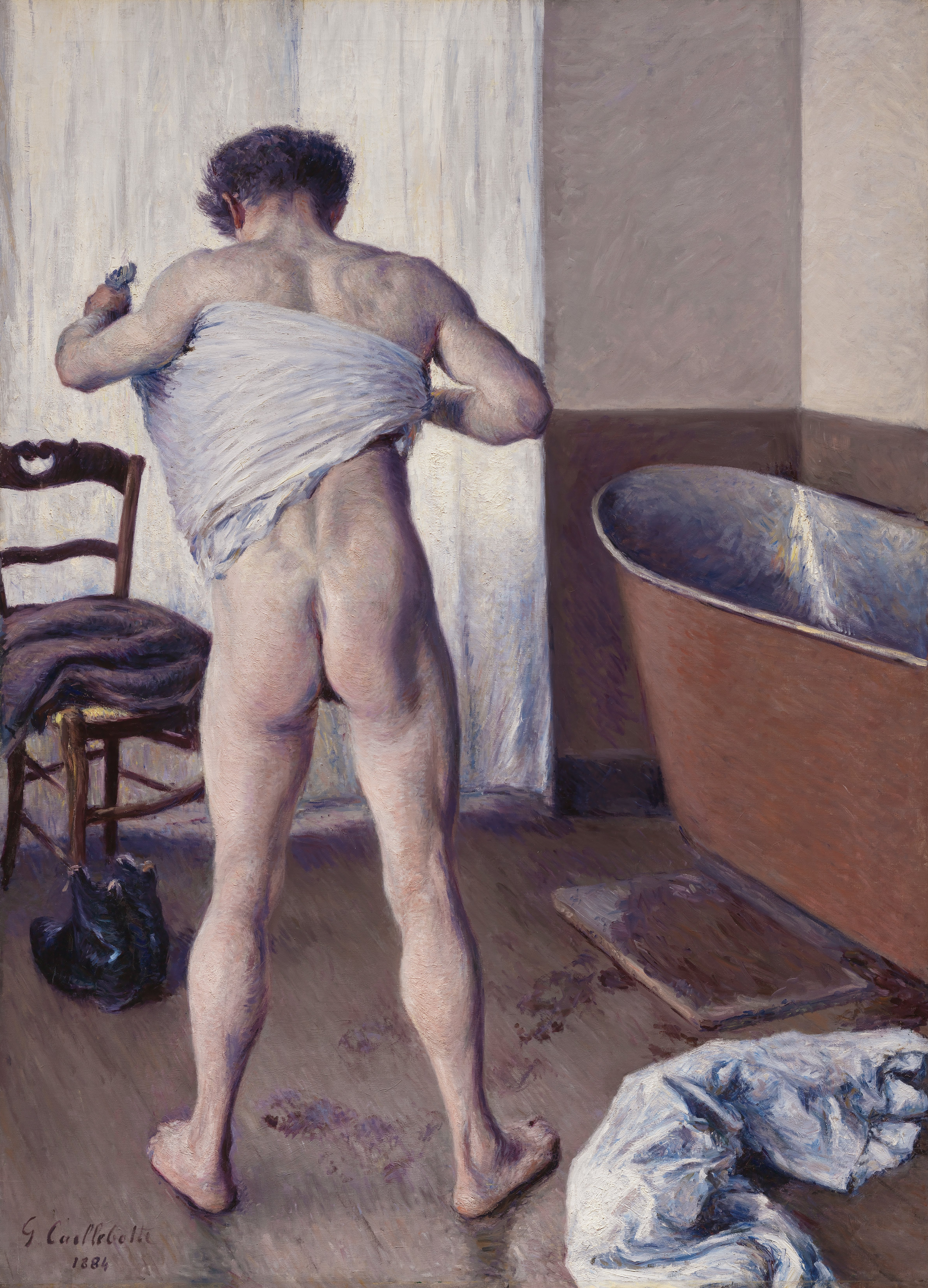
Homme au bain (1884)
Museum of Fine Arts, Boston

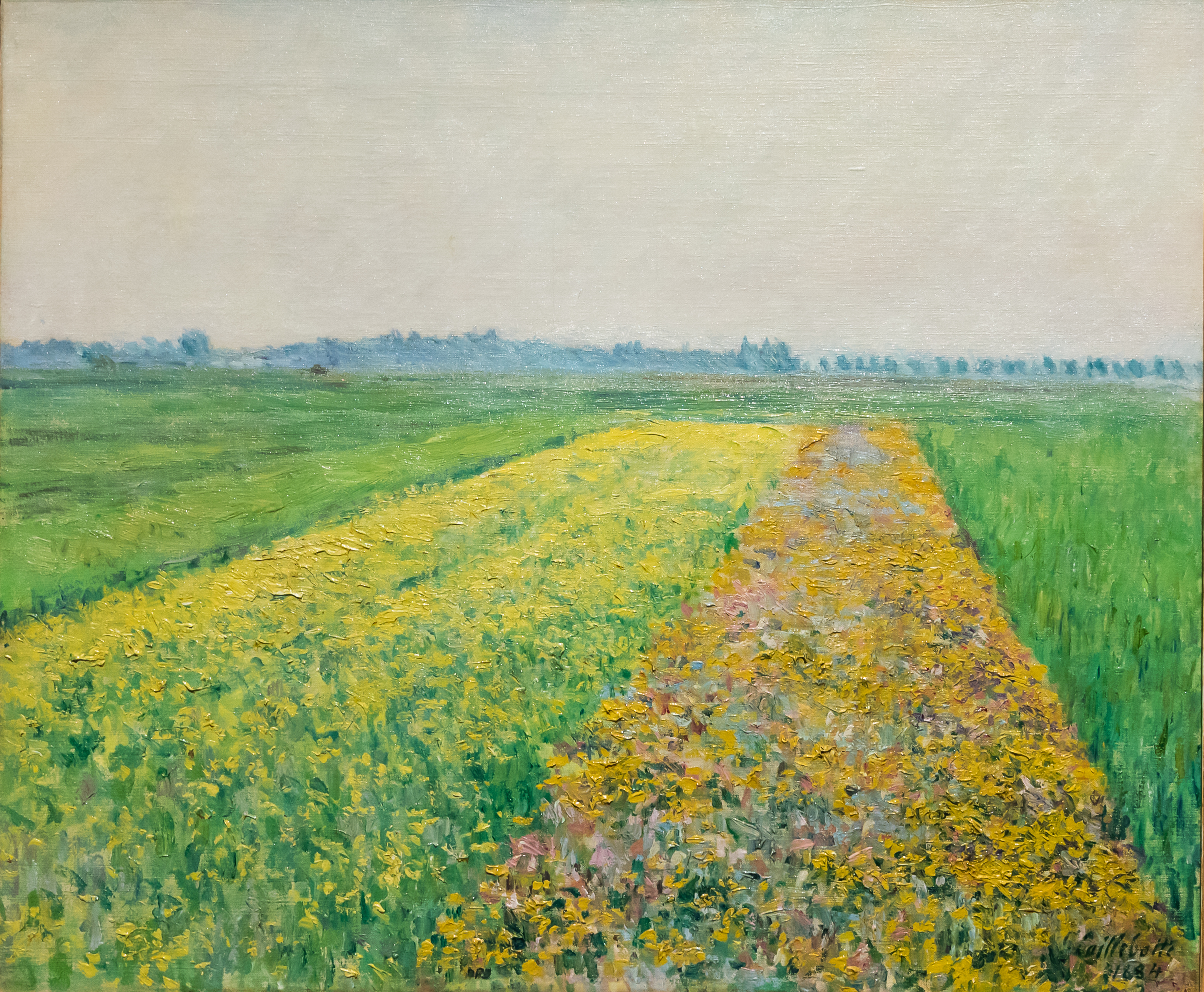
The Yellow Fields at Gennevilliers (1884)
Lent to the Wallraf–Richartz Museum, Cologne

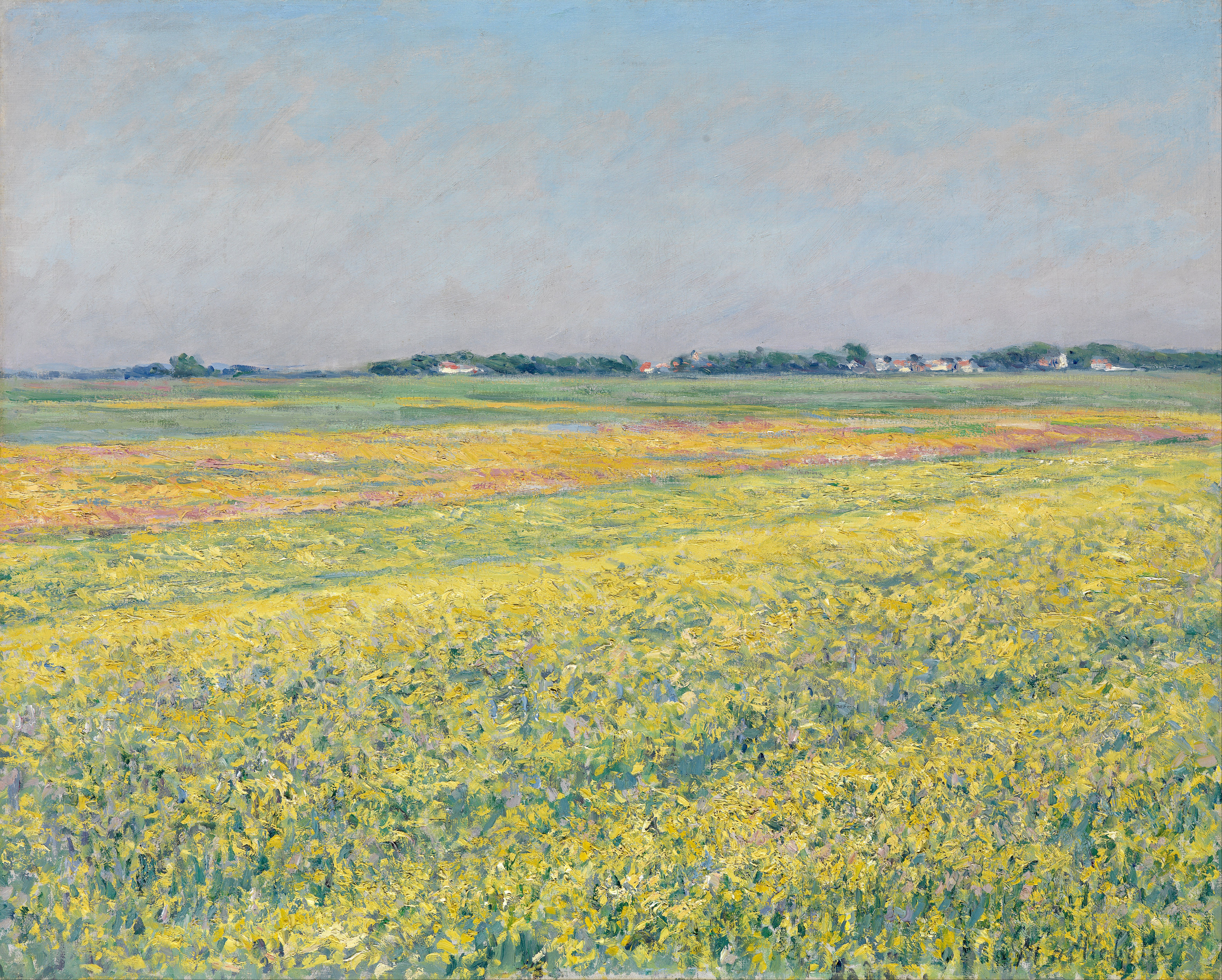
The plain of Gennevilliers, yellow fields (1884)
National Gallery of Victoria, Melbourne

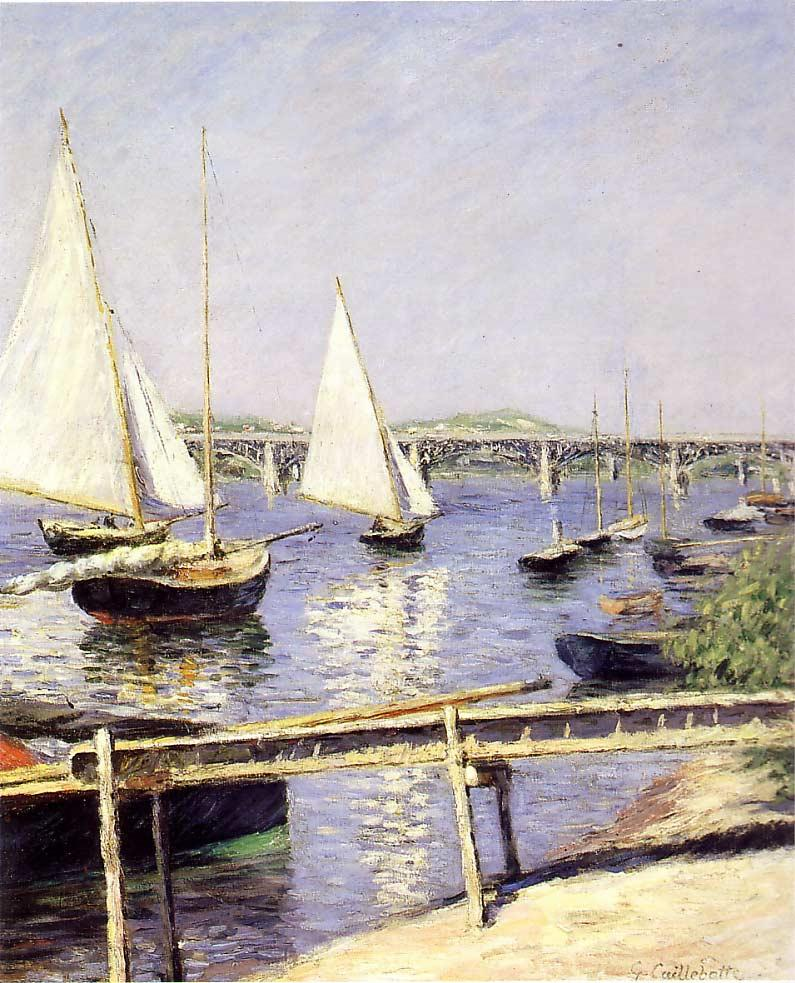
Voiliers à Argenteuil (1888)
Musée d'Orsay, Paris

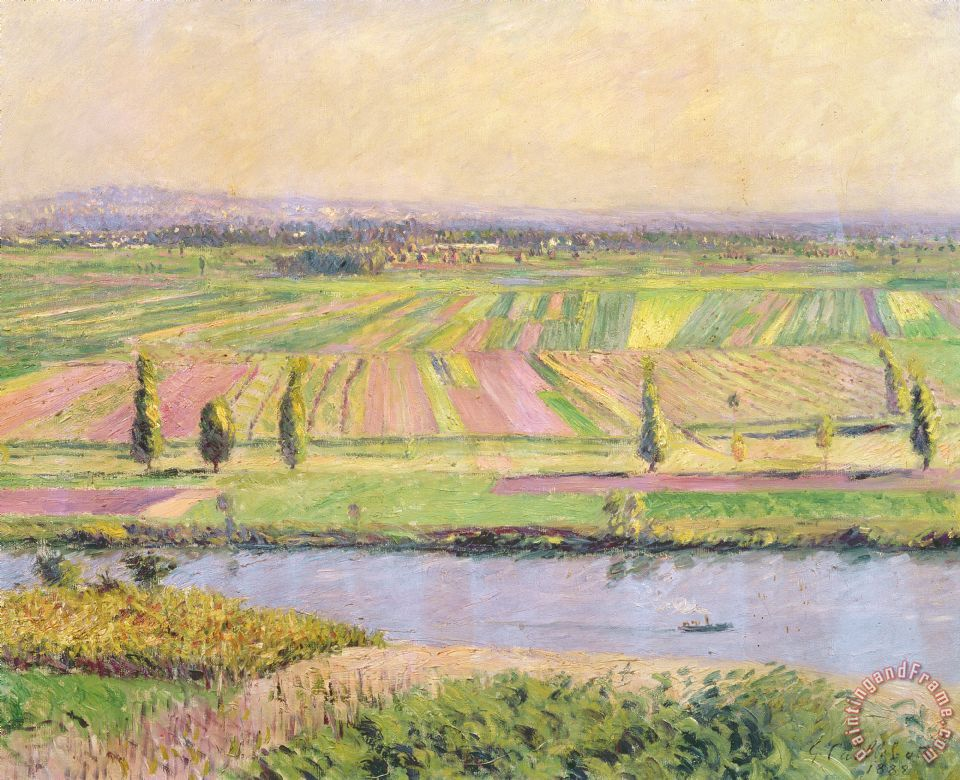
La Plaine de Gennevilliers (1888)
Private collection

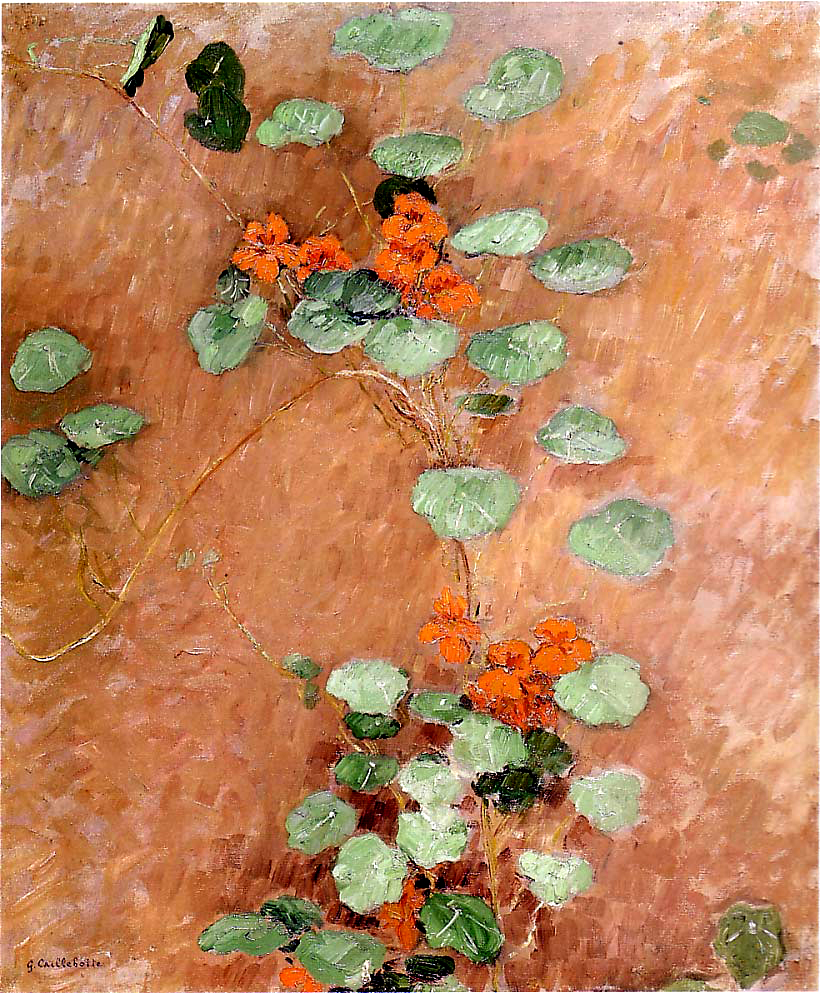
Nasturces (1892)
Private collection

== References and sources ==
=== Sources ===
- Berhaut, Marie (1994). Gustave Caillebotte: Catalogue raisonné des peintures et pastels. Paris: Wildenstein Institute.
- Broude, Norma, ed. (2002). Gustave Caillebotte and the Fashioning of Identity in Impressionist Paris. New Brunswick, New Jersey: Rutgers University Press.
- Distel, Anne (1996). Gustave Caillebotte: The Unknown Impressionist. London: The Royal Academy of Arts, London.
- Distel, Anne; Druick, Douglas W.; Groom, Gloria & Rapetti, Rodolphe (1995). Gustave Caillebotte, Urban Impressionist. New York: Abbeville Publishing Group (Abbeville Press, Inc.) & The Art Institute of Chicago. (American catalogue for retrospective exhibition in Paris, Chicago, & Los Angeles, 1994–1995.)
- Charles, Daniel; Fonsmark, Anne-Birgitte; Hansen, Dorothee; Hedin, Gry & Thomson, Richard (2008). Gustave Caillebotte. Published by Hatje Cantz. (Exhibition catalogue for exhibition at Ordrupgaard, Copenhagen & Kunsthalle Bremen, 2008–2009)
- Morton, Mary & Shackelford, George T. M. (2015). "Gustave Caillebotte: The Painter's Eye". Chicago: University of Chicago Press (Catalogue for retrospective exhibition in Washington, D.C., and Fort Worth, Texas 2015–2016.)
- Varnedoe, Kirk (1987). Gustave Caillebotte. New Haven: Yale University Press. ISBN 0-300-03722-8
- Wittmer, Pierre (1991). Caillebotte and His Garden at Yerres. New York: Harry N. Abrams, Inc.
