= Homme au bain =

Homme au bain may refer to:

- Homme au bain (painting), a painting by the Impressionist Gustave Caillebotte.
- Man at Bath, a French film titled Homme au bain in its native language.
