= Vue de toits (Effet de neige) =

Painting by Gustave Caillebotte

- View of rooftops (Effect of snow) (English)
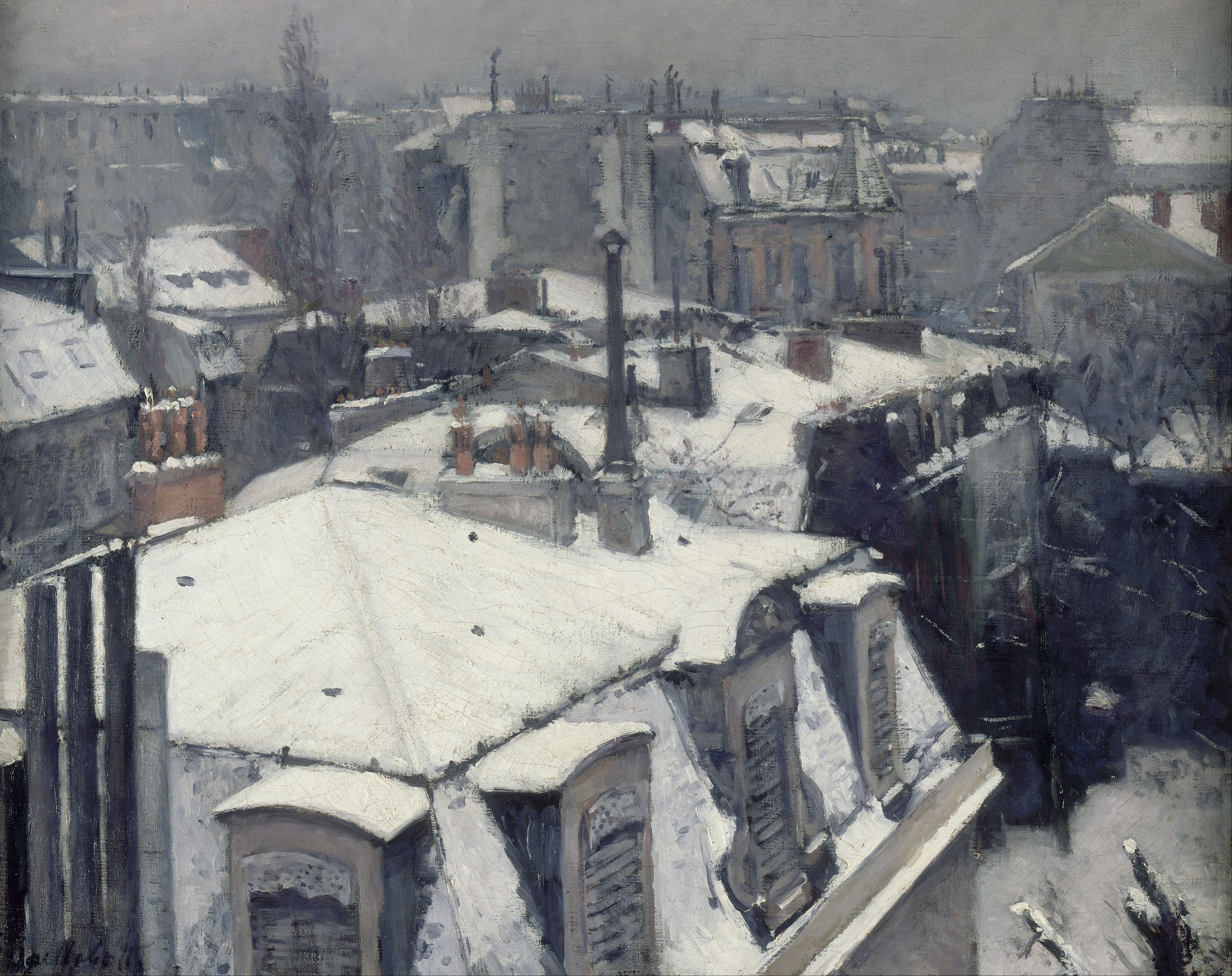
- Artist: Gustave Caillebotte
- Year: 1878/1879
- Medium: Oil on canvas
- Dimensions: 65 cm × 81 cm (25 5/8 in × 31 7/8 in)
- Location: Musée d'Orsay, Paris

Vue de toits (Effet de neige) (English title: View of rooftops (Effect of snow)) is an oil painting executed during the winter of 1878 and 1879 by French impressionist Gustave Caillebotte. The canvas measures 81 by 65 centimetres (32 in × 26 in). It was originally gifted by Caillebotte's brother in 1894 to the Musée du Luxembourg, then transferred to the Musée du Louvre in 1929. In 1947, it was moved to the Galerie nationale du Jeu de Paume, which held many impressionist works in France after World War II. In 1986, it was transferred again to the Musée d'Orsay in Paris. The painting is one of the few Caillebotte works that have remained in public view since the artist's death in 1894.

Caillebotte created many paintings showing urban Paris from unexpected perspectives, such as a streetscape seen from indoors in Jeune homme à la fenêtre (1875), or the exaggerated perspective of Rue de Paris, temps de pluie (1877). Vue de toits depicts snow-covered rooftops in Montmartre, Paris from a high vantage point, possibly a balcony. Here Caillebotte employs a largely monochromatic palette of grays, adding additional color to highlight building features. This perspective was not at all common in French paintings, and in fact Caillebotte may have been inspired by the photographic works of Hippolyte Bayard.

The painting was first shown at the fourth Impressionist Exhibition held in Paris in 1879, one of 25 works Caillebotte brought to the show. At the time, it did not garner much interest from the crowds, who preferred his portraits and nautical images. However, this image, and one other showing views of rooftops at that show, are now considered important works.

== See also ==
- List of paintings by Gustave Caillebotte
