= Le Pont de l'Europe =

Painting by Gustave Caillebotte

- The Europe Bridge (English)
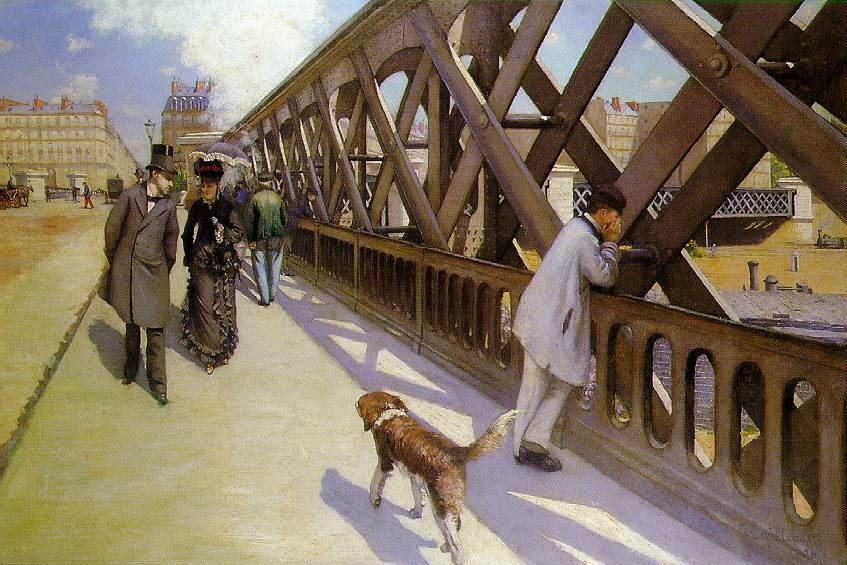
- Artist: Gustave Caillebotte
- Year: 1876
- Medium: Oil on canvas
- Dimensions: 125 cm × 181 cm (49 in × 71 in)
- Location: Musée du Petit Palais, Geneva

Le Pont de l'Europe (English title: The Europe Bridge) is an oil painting by French impressionist Gustave Caillebotte completed in 1876. It is held by the Musée du Petit Palais in Geneva, Switzerland. The canvas measures 125 by 181 centimetres (49 in × 71 in).

== Description ==
The image shows pedestrians in the Place de l'Europe in the 8th arrondissement of Paris. The plaza is a large bridge joining six avenues, each named for a European capital, over the railroad yards at Gare Saint-Lazare. The view is from the rue de Vienne, looking towards the center of the plaza. One of the bridge's trusses is very prominent, visible in half of the image.

Three people are seen in the foreground: a couple walking toward the observer, and a working-class man peering off the bridge toward the train station. A dog walks away from the observer, and other individuals appear in the mid-background. The man of the couple is a flâneur, an upper-class street observer. He is strolling with a woman dressed in black. She has often been interpreted to be a prostitute, according to contemporary social norms regarding women in public, especially in the area of the train station. Alternatively, the man has been thought to be Caillebotte himself, and the woman to be Caillebotte's companion, Anne-Marie Hagen. The flâneur is looking past his companion in the direction of the other man. Feminist art historian Norma Broude has suggested that Caillebotte, a lifelong bachelor, is signalling his own homosexuality with this gaze. In this reading, Caillebotte is an upper-class man cruising for a lower-class male prostitute in this unsavory neighborhood of Paris. However, Caillebotte's sexual orientation is not definitively known.

Caillebotte displayed this image at the impressionist exhibition of 1877, alongside his Rue de Paris, temps de pluie and Claude Monet's Le Pont de l'Europe, Gare Saint-Lazare, which gives an alternate view of the bridge.

Caillebotte, as in many of his works, employs perspective. The vanishing point is located behind the head of the man, which is far to the side of the picture, creating oblique perspective. Caillebotte was influenced by Japanese art, especially the work of Hiroshige, and by photography, then a burgeoning artistic field. In turn, this painted composition may have been an influence in photographer Jeff Wall's work from 1982, Mimic, which features similar exaggerated perspective and class tension between the three similarly situated characters.

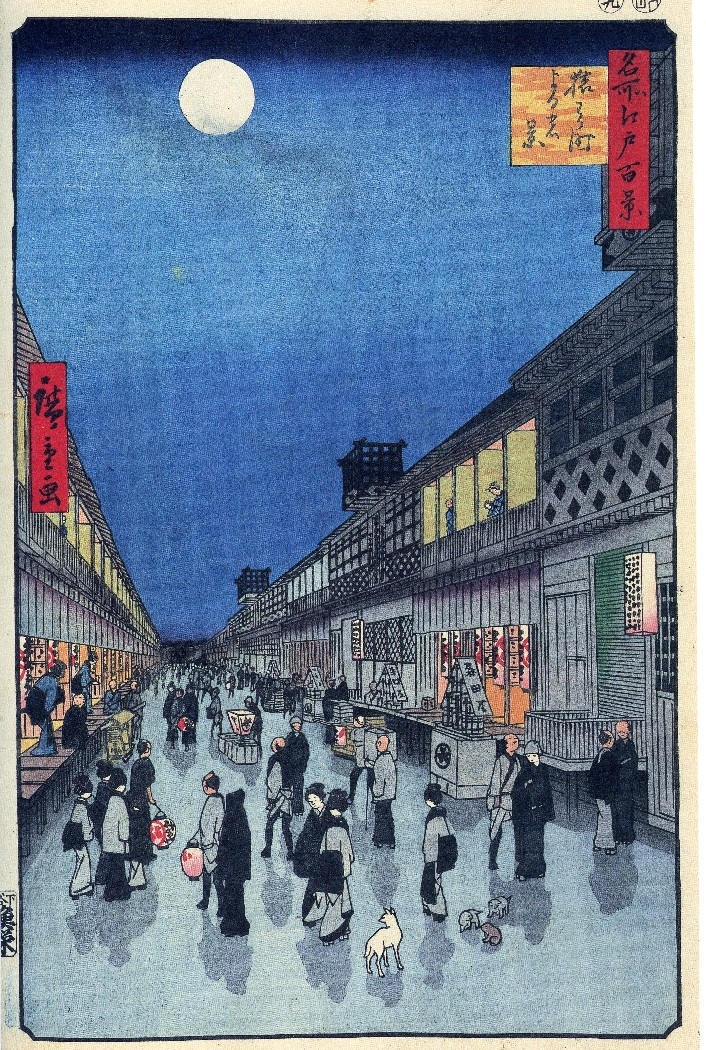
Utagawa Hiroshige, One Hundred Famous Views of Edo - #90, Night View of Saruwaka-machi, 1856

== Gallery ==
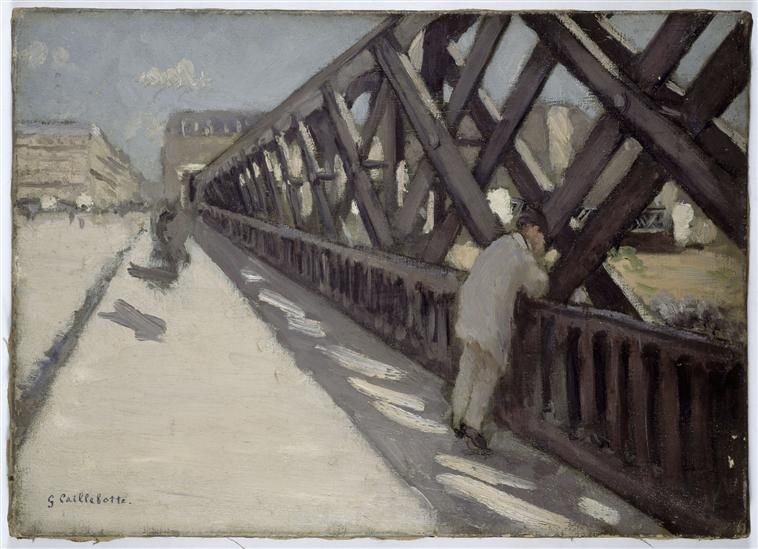
Sketch 1876, Musée des beaux-arts de Rennes

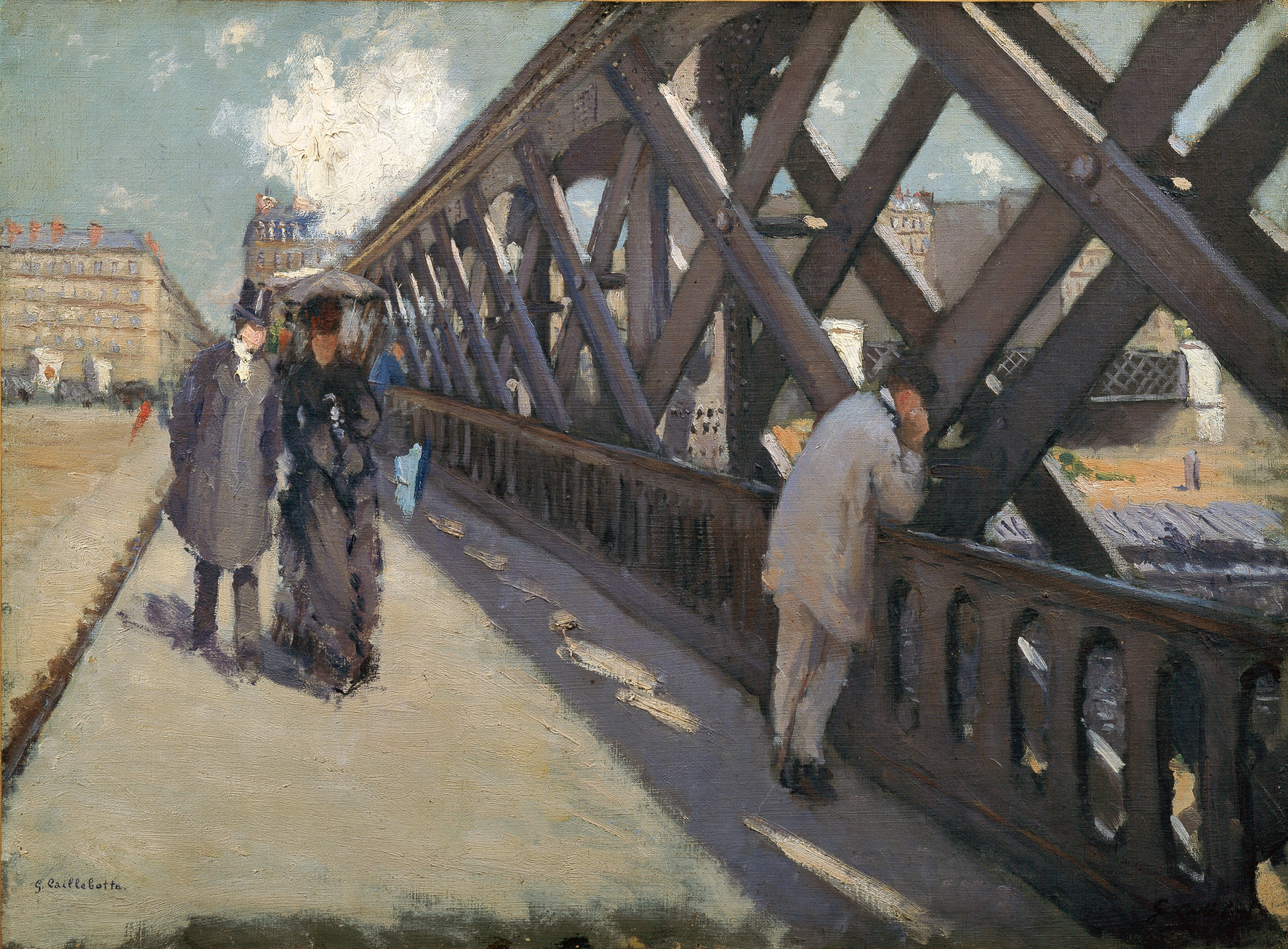
Oil sketch, c. 1876

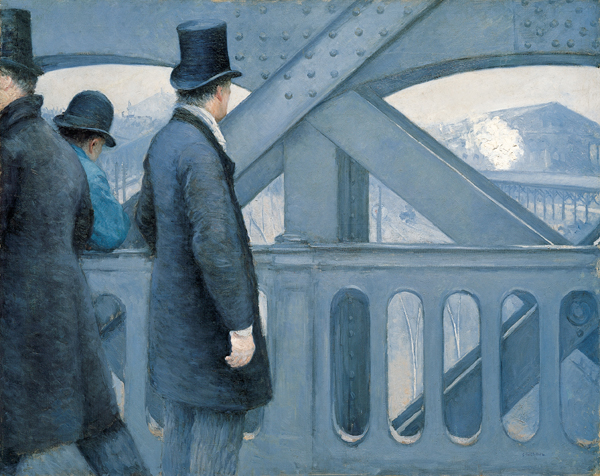
Sur le Pont de l'Europe (1877)
Kimbell Art Museum

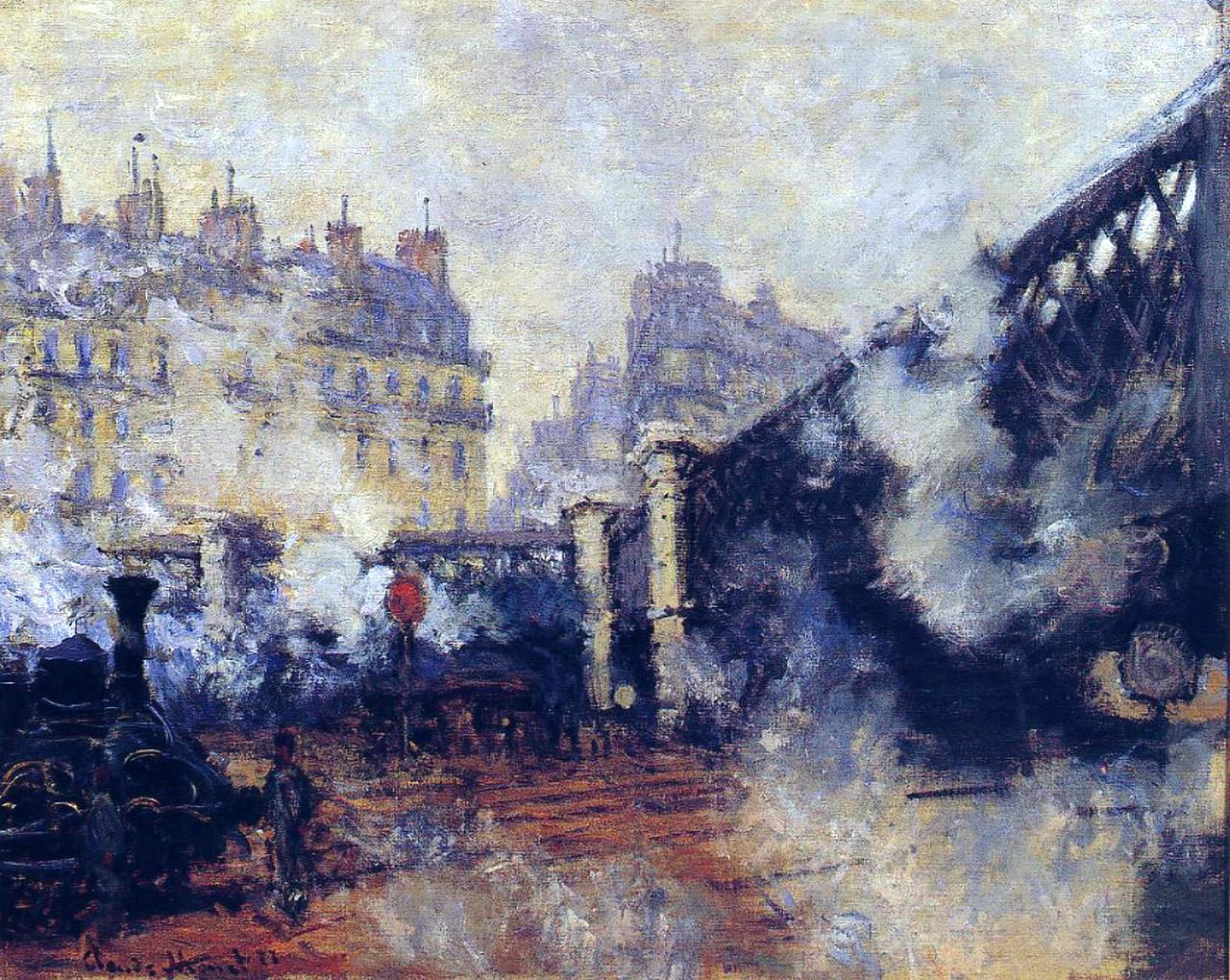
Claude Monet, Le Pont de l'Europe, Gare Saint-Lazare, 1877, Musée Marmottan

== See also ==
- List of paintings by Gustave Caillebotte
