= List of paintings by Gustave Caillebotte =

This is an incomplete list of the paintings by the French Impressionist artist Gustave Caillebotte. Of independent means, Caillebotte was not obliged to sell his paintings to make a living, but nevertheless produced over 400 canvasses.

The catalog numbers of the works are as listed in the Catalogue Raisonné of the Wilderstein Institute.

== 1870–1878 (Yerres) ==
Image	Name	Year	H x W (cm)	Current Location	Cat No
	Déjeuner de canotiers au bord de l'Yerres		32 x 25	Private collection	1
	Après déjeuner				2
	Willows by the Yerres (Saules au bord de l'Yerres)	c.1872	31 x 40	Private collection	3
	Woman Seated beneath a Tree (Femme assise sous un arbre)	c.1874	46 x 38	Private collection	4
	Landscape with Railway Tracks (Paysage à la voie de chemin de fer)	c.1872	81 x 116	Private collection	5
	A Road in Naples (Une route à Naples)	1872	40 x 60	Private collection	6
	Bord du canal, près de Naples	1872	40 x 60	Private collection	7
	Naked Woman Lying on a Couch (Femme nue étendue sur un divan)	1873	87 x 113	Private collection Promised gift to the Metropolitan Museum of Art, New York	8
	Woman at a Dressing Table (Femme à sa toilette)	c.1873	65 x 81	Private collection	9
	Interior of a Studio (Intérieur d'atelier au poèle)	c.1873	81 x 65	Private collection	10
	Lilas dans un vase blanc		24 x 19	Private collection	11
	Still Life (Nature morte:pichet, pommes et raisin)		62 x 76	Musée du Vieux-Château, Laval	12
	Canard d'Inde		60 x 73	Private collection	13
	Still Life (Nature morte:fruits, pot et pipe)		38 x 55		14
	Still Life (Nature morte:panier de fruits et vase de fleurs)		55 x 46	Private collection	15
	Portrait of Bérenger		45 x 38	Private collection	16
	The Painter Morot in his Studio (Le peintre Morot dans son atelier)	1874	45 x 54		17
	Horses in the Stable (Chevaux à l'écurie)	c.1874	33 x 46	Private collection	18
	Landscape with Haystacks (Paysage aux meules de paille)	c.1874	18 x 35	Private collection	19
	Paysage sous la neige		29 x 33	Private collection	20
	The Yerres, Rain (L'Yerres, effet de pluie)	1875	81 x 59	Eskenazi Museum of Art, University of Indiana	21
	Lavoir au bord de l'Yerres		19 x 46	Private collection	22
	Landscape, Banks of the Yerres (Bord de l'étang, Parc d'Yerres)	c.1875	40 x 49	Private collection	23
	Prairie à Yerres		73 x 92	Private collection	24
	The Park on the Caillebotte Property at Yerres (Le parc de la propriété Caillebotte à Yerres)	1875	65 x 92	Private collection	25
	Self-portrait (Autoportrait)	c.1875	64 x 48		26
	Billiards (Le billard)	c.1875	60 x 81	Private collection	27
	Remise de barques près de Port-Marly		38 x 46	Kunsthalle Bremen, Germany	28
	La Seine à Port-Marly		35 x 65	Private collection	29
	La machine de Marly		27 x 34	Private collection	30
	Bord de rivière, effet de brume matinale		46 x 55	Private collection	31
	Man at the Window (Jeune homme a sa fenêtre)	1875	116 x 80	Getty Center	32
	The Parquet Planers (Les raboteurs de parquet)	1875	26 x 39	Private collection	33
	Études pour les raboteurs de parquet	1875	48 x 31	Private collection	33a
	The Parquet Planers (Les raboteurs de parquet)	1875	102 x 145	Musée d'Orsay, Paris	34
	The Parquet Planers (Les raboteurs de parquet)	1876	80 x 100	Private collection	35
	Jeune homme au piano	1876	81 x 116	Artizon Museum, Tokyo	36
	Luncheon (Le déjeuner)	1876	52 x 75	Private collection	37
	Coin d'un parc, Yerres		27 x 35	Private collection	38
	The Garden at Yerres (Le jardin à Yerres)	c.1876	59 x 81	Private collection	39
	Portraits in the countryside (Portraits à la campagne)		95 x 111	Musée d'Art et d'Histoire Baron Gérard, Bayeux	40
	La partie de cartes		45 x 58	Private collection	41
	Le jardin de Luxembourg en automne		57 x 84	Private collection	42
	Le Pont d'Europe, esquisse	c.1876	32 x 45	Musée des Beaux-Arts, Rennes, France	43
	Le Pont d'Europe, esquisse	c.1876	82 x 120	Albright-Knox Gallery, Buffalo, New York	44
	Le Pont d'Europe, esquisse	c.1876	54 x 73	Private collection	45
	Le Pont d'Europe, étude partielle	c.1876	55 x 38	Private collection	46
	Le Pont d'Europe, étude partielle	c.1876	56 x 46	Private collection	47
	Le Pont d'Europe, étude partielle	c.1876	73 x 60		48
	Le Pont d'Europe	1876	125 x 180	Musée du Petit Palais, Geneva	49
	Le Pont d'Europe, esquisse	1876	65 x 81	Private collection	50
	Le Pont d'Europe	1876	105 x 131	Kimbell Art Museum, Fort Worth, Texas	51
	Les peintres en bâtiment (study)	1877	60 x 73	Private collection	52
	Les peintres en bâtiment	1877	89 x 116	Private collection	53
	Rue de Paris, temps de pluie, étude partielle		54 x 65	Private collection	54
	Homme et femme sous un parapluie		45 x 32	Private collection	55
	Paris Street, a Rainy Day, study (Rue de Paris, temps de pluie, esquisse)	1877	54 x 65	Musée Marmottan, Paris	56
	Paris Street, a Rainy Day (Rue de Paris, temps de pluie)	1877	212 x 276	Art Institute of Chicago	57
	Portrait of Madame Martial Caillebotte	1877	83 x 72	Private collection	58
	Portrait of a Young Woman in an Interior (Portrait de jeune femme dans un intérieur)	c.1877	81 x 65	Private collection	59
	Portrait of a Man (Portrait de M.R.)	1877	105 x 80	Private collection	60
	Portrait de A. Cassabois	1877	80 x 74	Private collection on loan to Los Angeles County Museum of Art	61
	Portraits dans un intérieur	1877	46 x 56	Private collection	62
	Portrait de jeune femme		106 x 82	Private collection	63
	Le parc Monceau	1877	50 x 65	Private collection	64
	Une rue à Yerres		55 x 65	Private collection	65
	Maison et jardins, Yerres		54 x 65	Private collection	66
	Portrait of Mademoiselle Boissiere Knitting (Madame Boissière tricotant)	1877	65 x 80	Museum of Fine Arts, Houston, Texas	67
	Portrait de Zöe Caillebotte	1877	81 x 100	Private collection	68
	Portrait de Camille Daurelle	1877	40 x 32	Musée d'Orsay, Paris	69
	Camille Daurelle dans le parc de Yerres	1877	73 x 60	Musée d'Orsay, Paris	70
	Zöe Caillebotte dans le jardin, Yerres	1877	47 x 59	Private collection	71
	Jeune homme au chapeau de paille		45 x 40	Private collection	72
	The Park at Yerres (Le parc de Yerres)	1877	81 x 59	Private collection	73
	Un jardin, Yerres		27 x 22	Private collection	74
	The Wall of the Kitchen Garden, Yerres (Le mur du jardin potager, Yerres)	c.1877	27 x 41	Private collection	75
	The Wall of the Kitchen Garden, Yerres (Le mur du jardin potager, Yerres)	c.1877	44 x 49	Private collection	76
	Le parc de Yerres, étude de fleurs			Private collection	77
	Jardin potager, Yerres	1877	42 x 54	Private collection	78
	The Gardener (Le Jardinier)	1877	60 x 73	Private collection	79
	The Gardeners (Les Jardiniers)	1877	90 x 117	Private collection	80
	The Kitchen Garden (Le jardin potager, Yerres)	c.1877	60 x 73	Private collection	81
	Landscape near Yerres (Vue du jardin de l'artiste et de la vallée de l'Yerres)		48 x 65		82
	Canotiers ramant sur l'Yerres	1877	81 x 116	Private collection	83
	Boaters on the Yerres (Canotiers sur l'Yerres)	1877	30 x 46	Private collection	84
	Canotiers péchant sur l'Yerres	1877		Private collection	85
	Boating on the Yerres (Périssoires sur l'Yerres)	1877	103 x 156	Milwaukee Art Museum	86
	Skiffs on the Yerres (Périssoires sur l'Yerres)	1877	89 x 115	National Gallery of Art, Washington D.C.	87
	Skiff (Périssoires sur l'Yerres)		65 x 81	Norton Simon Museum, Pasadena, California	88
	The Bather or The Diver (Baigneurs, bord de l'Yerres)	1877	75 x 95	Musée d'Orsay, Paris	89
	The Nap (La sieste)	1877	36 x 53	Wadsworth Atheneum, Hartford, Connecticut	90
	Paysage aux meules	1877	44 x 61		91
	Vallée de l'Yerres	1877	57 x 72	Private collection	92
	Rue Halevy, View from a Balcony (La Rue Halévy, vue d'un balcon)	1877	54 x 65	Museum Barberini, Potsdam	
	Paysage urbain sous la neige		40 x 52	Private collection	93
	Temps de neige à Paris		36 x 45	Private collection	94
	Toits sous la neige, Paris	1878	59 x 72	Private collection	95
	Roofs under the Snow (Toits sous la neige)		64 x 82	Musée d'Orsay, Paris	96
	Partie de bateau		89,5 x 116,7	Musée d'Orsay, Paris	96
	Vue de toits, Paris	1878	60 x 73	Private collection	97
	Vue de toits, Paris		50 x 65	Private collection	98
	Rue Halevy, Balcony View (La Rue Halévy, vue d'un balcon)		60 x 73	Private collection	99
	Rue Halevy, Seen from the Sixth Floor (La Rue Halévy, vue du sixième étage)	1878	60 x 73	Museum Barberini, Potsdam	100
	La Place Vintimille		73 x 60	Private collection	101
	The Park Monceau (Le Parc Monceau)	1878	65 x 81	Private collection	102
	Place Saint Augustin, Misty Weather (La Place Saint-Augustin, temps brumeux)	1878	54 x 65	Private collection	103
	The Pépinière Barracks (La Caserne de la Pépinière)		54 x 65	Private collection	104
	Vue de Paris, soleil		105 x 74	Private collection	105
	Portrait d'homme		49 x 38	Private collection	106
	Portrait de Richard Gallo		80 x 65	Private collection	107
	Le peintre de nature morte		32 x 23	Private collection	108
	Portrait d'Eugène Daufresne lisant	1878	100 x 81	Private collection	109
	Portrait of Madame X	1878	65 x 50	Musée Fabre, Montpellier	110
	Portrait de Paul Hugot	1878	204 x 92	Private collection	111
	Portrait de Madame Charles Caillebotte	1878	92 x 74	Private collection	112
	Portrait de Marie Caillebotte	1878	40 x 26	Private collection	113
	The Orange Trees (Les orangers)	1878	157 x 117	Museum of Fine Arts, Houston	114
	The Painter under His Parasol (Peintre sous son parasol)	c.1878	80 x 65	Private collection	115
	Theodore Robinson peignant sous un parasol au bord d'une rivière		38 x 46	Private collection	116
	Pêcheurs au bord de l'Yerres		66 x 50	Private collection	117
	Pêche à la ligne	1878	157 x 113	Private collection	118
	Baigneurs, bords de l'Yerres	1878	157 x 117	Private collection	119
	Périssoires sur l'Yerres		157 x 113	Musée des Beaux-Arts, Rennes	120
	Bather Preparing to Dive (Baigneur s'aprêtant à plonger, bord de l'Yerres)		117 x 89	Private collection	121
	Boat party or Rower in a Top Hat (Partie de bateau or Canotier au chapeau haut de forme)	1877-1878	90 x 117	Musée d'Orsay, Paris	122
	Canotier ramenant sa périssoire, bord de l'Yerres	1878	73 x 93	Virginia Museum of Fine Arts, Richmond	123
	Canot à voile sur l'Yerres	1878		Private collection	124
	Banks of the Yerres (Bords de l'Yerres)		15 x 22	Private collection	125
	Le veau et la chèvre			Private collection	126
	Prairie, Yerres		46 x 61	Private collection	127
	Paysage, environs de Yerres		46 x 34	Private collection	128

== 1879–1881 (Paris) ==
Image	Name	Year	H x W (cm)	Current Location	Cat No
	Portrait de Jules Richemond	1879	100 x 81	Private collection	129
	Portrait de Jules Froyez	1879	82 x 65	Private collection	130
	Portrait of a Schoolboy (Portrait d'un collegièn)		65 x 54	Private collection	131
	Self-Portrait with an Easel (Autoportrait au chevalet)		90 x 115	Private collection	132
	Still Life (Nature morte: verres, carafes et compotiers de fruits)	1879	50 x 60	Private collection	133
	En bateau sur la Seine		95 x 129	Private collection	134
	Navires dans un bassin, Le Havre		65 x 49	Ahmed Zabana National Museum, Oran, Algeria	135
	Navires dans un bassin, Le Havre		65 x 54	Private collection	136
	Homme au chapeau haut de forme, assis près d'une fenêtre	1880	100 x 81	Musée National des Beaux-Arts d'Alger, Algiers	137
	Portrait d'homme	1880	82 x 65	Private collection	138
	Interior, Woman Reading (Intérieure, femme lisant)	1880	65 x 81	Private collection	139
	Interior, Woman at the Window (Intérieure, femme à la fenêtre)	1880	116 x 89	Private collection	140
	Tête d'homme		55 x 38	Private collection	141
	Dans un café	1880	155 x 115	Musée des Beaux-Arts, Rouen (deposit of Musée d'Orsay, Paris)	142
	Rue de Paris vue d'en haut		33 x 23	Private collection	143
	Boulevard des Italiens		54 x 65	Private collection	144
	Homme au balcon	c.1880	116 x 90	Private collection	145
	Un balcon, Boulevard Haussmann		69 x 62	Private collection	146
	Vue prise à travers un balcon	1880	65 x 54	Van Gogh Museum, Amsterdam	147
	A Balcony in Paris (Un balcon, Boulevard Haussmann)		55 x 38	Private collection	148
	Homme au balcon, Boulevard Haussmann	1880	117 x 90	Private collection	149
	Vase de fleurs devant une fenêtre		65 x 81	Private collection	150
	Fillette au balcon		41 x 33	Private collection	151
	L'homme au Gil Blas	1880	27 x 33	Private collection	152
	Traffic Island on Boulevard Haussmann (Un refuge, Boulevard Haussmann)		81 x 101	Private collection	153
	The Boulevard Viewed from Above (Le boulevard vu d'en haut)		65 x 54	Private collection	154
	14 Juillet Rue Lepic		60 x 35	Private collection	155
	La Place Saint-Georges		73 x 92	Private collection	156
	Rue de Mont-Cenis, Montmartre		73 x 92	Private collection	157
	Chemin montant	1881	100.2 x 125.3	Museum Barberini, Potsdam	158
	Étude de rue, Paris				159
	Attelage de Fardier		30 x 25	Private collection	160
	Villers-sur-Mer	1880	60 x 73	Private collection	161
	Villas à Villers-sur-Mer		65 x 81	Private collection	162
	Maison sur la campagne normande		26 x 35	Private collection	163
	Villas au bord de la mer, Normandie		58 x 65	Private collection	164
	Vue de mar, Villers	1880	54 x 65	Private collection	165
	Bois près de la mer	1880	65 x 55	Private collection	166
	Marine, régates à Villers		75 x 101	Private collection	167
	Maisons sur la falaise, bord du mer			Private collection	168
	Un champ à Villers	1880	46 x 55	Private collection	169
	La maison dans les arbres	1880	60 x 73	Private collection	170
	Verger en Normandie	1880	54 x 44	Private collection	171
	Route en Normandie	1880	54 x 44	Private collection	172
	The Bezique Game (La partie de Bezique)	1880	121 x 161	Louvre Abu Dhabi	183
	Pommiers au bord de la mer, Trouville		65 x 54	Private collection	173
	Paysage en Normandie, pommier dans un vallon boisé		73 x 60	Private collection	174
	Paysage en Normandie, pommier dans un vallon boisé		82 x 65	Private collection	175
	Bord de mer en Normandie		59 x 81	Private collection	176
	Falaise en Normandie		73 x 60	Private collection	177
	Falaise en Normandie		65 x 81	Private collection	178
	Boulevard Haussmann, effet de neige		81 x 66	Private collection	179
	Boulevard Haussmann in the Snow (Boulevard Haussmann, effet de niege)		65 x 82	Private collection	180
	Portrait of Jules Froyez	1881	100 x 82	Private collection	181
	Portrait of Richard Gallo		97 x 116	Nelson-Atkins Museum of Art, Kansas City, Missouri	182
	Portrait d'homme	1881	45 x 38	Private collection	184
	A soldier (Un soldat)		106 x 75	Private collection	185
	The piano lesson (La leçon de piano)		81 x 65	Musée Marmottan, Paris	186
	Le jeu de la main chaude		128 x 116	Private collection	187
	La Vallée de la Trouques, Trouville		60 x 82	Private collection	188
	Paysage près de Trouville	1881	60 x 73	Private collection	189
	Route de Honfleur à Trouville		81 x 65	Private collection	190
	Chemin couvert en Normandie		50 x 54	Private collection	191
	Chemin à l'Orée d'un bois		60 x 72	Private collection	192
	Fruits on a stand (Fruits à l'étalage)		75 x 100	Museum of Fine Arts, Boston	193
	Deux perdreaux		38 x 55	Private collection	194
	Still Life with Oysters (Nature morte aux huitres)		38 x 55	Private collection	195
	Nature morte au plat de langouste		58 x 72	Private collection	196
	Gâteaux		25 x 55	Private collection	197
	Hors d'oeuvre		25 x 55	Private collection	198
	Giroflées		61 x 46	Private collection	199
	Dahlias dans une vase		55 x 46	Private collection	200
	Nu au divan		131 x 196	Minneapolis Institute of Arts	201
	Femme assise sur un sofa à fleurs rouges	1882	81 x 65	Seattle Art Museum	202

== 1881–1894 (Paris and Petit Gennevilliers) ==
Image	Name	Year	H x W (cm)	Current Location	Cat No
	Massif de fleurs, jardin de Petit Gennevilliers		54 x 65	Private collection	203
	Arbre en fleurs		80 x 66	Musée d'Orsay, Paris	204
	Hangar dans le jardin du Petit Gennevilliers		54 x 65	Private collection	205
	La maison de l'artiste au Petit Gennevilliers		65 x 54	Private collection	206
	Le jardin potager, Petit Gennevilliers		66 x 81	Private collection	207
	Une maison au Petit Gennevilliers		65 x 54	Private collection	208
	Enclos avec arbres frutiers dans un paysage		65 x 54	Private collection	209
	Le quai du Petit Gennevilliers		73 x 60	Private collection	210
	Arbre au bord d'un sentier	1882	28 x 41	Private collection	211
	Le Verger		51 x 62	Private collection	212
	Voiliers sur la Seine, Argenteuil		62 x 75	Private collection	213
	Bateaux à voile à Argenteuil		65 x 55	Musée d'Orsay, Paris	214
	La berge et la pont d'Argenteuil	1882	60 x 71	Private collection	215
	Le bassin d'Argenteuil		65 x 81	Private collection	216
	La Seine a Argenteuil		60 x 73	Private collection	217
	Voiliers au pont d'Argenteuil		65 x 54	Private collection	218
	Voiliers en mer		54 x 65	Private collection	219
	Champ au bord de la mer, Trouville		54 x 65	Private collection	220
	La mer vue de Villerville		60 x 71	Private collection	221
	Les toits de l'Hôtel des Roches Noires, Trouville	1882	54 x 65	Private collection	222
	Villas à Trouville	1882	65 x 82	Tokyo Fuji Art Museum	223
	Paysage de bord de mer, Trouville	1882	65 x 82	Private collection	224
	Bord de mer en Normandie		65 x 54	Private collection	225
	Une villa à Trouville		54 x 65	Private collection	226
	La plage de Trouville, vue de la corniche		50 x 73	Private collection	227
	Trouville, la plage et les villas		65 x 82	Nationalmuseum, Stockholm [4]	228
	La Chaumière, Trouville		54 x 65	Private collection	229
	La Chaumière à Trouville		60 x 73	Private collection	230
	Maison et jardin en Normandie		60 x 73	Private collection	231
	Un jardin à Trouville		65 x 82	Private collection	232
	Jardin à Trouville		27 x 35	Wallraf-Richartz Museum	233
	Chemin en Normandie	1882	81 x 65	Private collection	234
	L'allée de la Villa des Fleurs, Trouville	1882	65 x 54	Private collection	235
	Allée sous bois	1882	80 x 60	Private collection	236
	Mullet (Rougets)	1882	38 x 55	Private collection	237
	Melon et compotier de figues		54 x 65	Private collection	238
	L'assiette de pêches		38 x 46	Private collection	239
	Roses jaunes dans un vase	1882	54 x 46	Dallas Museum of Art	240
	Reines-Marguerites dans un vase		55 x 46	Private collection	241
	Nature morte: poulet et gibier		76 x 105	Private collection	242
	Veau á l'étal		144 x 74	Private collection	243
	Nature morte: tête de veau et langue du boeuf		73 x 54	Art Institute of Chicago	244
	Côte de boeuf		38 x 55	Private collection	245
	Deux canards sauvages		76 x 40	Private collection	246
	Deux faisans suspendu		73 x 54	Private collection	247
	Bécasses		55 x 38	Private collection	248
	Hare and Thrushes (Lièvre et grives)		79 x 36	Private collection	249
	Lièvre		89 x 35	Private collection	250
	Portrait d'Henri Cordier	1883	65 x 82	Musée d'Orsay, Paris	251
	Roses rouges dans un vase		46 x 38	Private collection	252
	Bouquet de rose dans un vase de cristal		61 x 51	Private collection	253
	Nature morte: un vase de lilas		72 x 60	Private collection	254
	Lilas et pivoines dans deux vases		92 x 73	Museum Barberini, Potsdam	255
	Lilas dans un vase		65 x 54	Private collection	256
	Le jardin du Petit Genevilliers	1883	60 x 73		257
	Musa, jardin du Petit Genevilliers		82 x 65	Private collection	258
	La promenade d'Argenteuil		60 x 70	Private collection	259
	La promenade d'Argenteuil		60 x 73	Private collection	260
	Marroniers rouges, Argenteuil		65 x 55	Private collection	261
	Maisons à Argenteuil	1883	65 x 54	Private collection	262
	La Place du Marché	1883	65 x 82	Musée Pissarro, Pontoise	263
	Argenteuil, Fête Foraine		65 x 81	Private collection	264
	Pommiers en fleures, coteau de Colombes		54 x 65	Private collection	265
	Verger aux pommiers en fleures, Colombes		60 x 81	Private collection	266
	Champ jaune, Gennevilliers	1883	61 x 81	Private collection	267
	Les champs, plaine de Gennevilliers, étude en jaune et vert		54 x 65	Private collection	268
	La plaine de Gennevilliers, groupe de poplars		54 x 65	Private collection	269
	Allée de la Villa des Fleurs, Trouville	1883	73 x 60	Private collection	270
	Allée de la Villa des Fleurs, Trouville	1883	65 x 54	Private collection	271
	Voiliers au mouillage sur la Seine à Argenteuil	1883	54 x 65	Private collection	272
	Voiliers au mouillage sur la Seine à Argenteuil	1883	60 x 73	Private collection	273
	Barques près de l'appontement		18 x 24	Private collection	274
	La barque rouge		73 x 60	Private collection	275
	Le ponton d'Argenteuil		74 x 100	Private collection	276
	La Seine à Argenteuil, bateaux au mouillage	1883	60 x 73	Private collection	277
	Bateau au mouillage, sur la Seine à Argenteuil		65 x 54	Private collection	278
	La Seine à Argenteuil, bateaux au mouillage		54 x 65	Private collection	279
	Barque près de la rive, effet d'automne		54 x 65	Private collection	280
	Faisans et bécasses sur une table de marbre	1883	51 x 81	Museum of Fine Arts, Springfield, Massachusetts	282
	Trois perdrix sur une table		38 x 67	Leigh Yawkey Woodson Art Museum, Wausau, Wisconsin	284
	Avenue de la Villa des Fleurs à Trouville	1883	60 x 73	Museum Barberini, Potsdam Musée	
	Wild Garden at Le Petit Gennevilliers (Jardin sauvage au Petit Gennevilliers)	c. 1882-1884	63.7 x 74.2	Museum Barberini, Potsdam	
	Homme s'essuyant la jambe	1884	100 x 125	Private collection	285
	Homme au bain	1884	145 x 114	Museum of Fine Arts, Boston	286
	La femme à la rose	1884	74 x 60	Private collection	287
	Portrait de femme au chapeau à plumes		46 X 35	Private collection	288
	La plaine de Gennevilliers, champs jaunes		65 x 81	Private collection	289
	The Yellow Fields at Gennevilliers (La Plaine de Gennevilliers, Champs jaunes)	1884	54 × 65	Wallraf Richartz Museum, Cologne Bildindex	
	Le coteau de Colombes		60 x 73	Wallraf-Richartz Museum, Cologne	290
	La plaine de Genevilliers		54 x 65	Botero Museum, Bogotá	292
	Le petit bras de la Seine à Argenteuil	1884	92 x 75	Private collection	302
	Le petit bras de la Seine à Argenteuil, effet de soleil		82 x 65	Private collection	303
	La berge du Petit Gennevilliers		38 x 46	Private collection	304
	Richard Gallo et son chien, Dick, au Petit Gennevilliers	1884	89 x 116	Private collection	305
	Le père Magloire sur le chemin de Saint-Clair à Étretat		65 x 54	Private collection	306
	Le père Magloire sur le chemin de Saint-Clair à Étretat		129 x 80	Musée du Petit Palais, Geneva	307
	Le père Magloire allongé dans un bois	1884	69 x 115	Musée du Petit Palais, Geneva	308
	Villas à Trouville	1884	64 x 81	Kemper Corporation, Kansas City	309
	La Villa Rose, Trouville		60 x 75	Private collection	310
	Régates en Mer à Villerville	1884	60 x 72	Toledo Museum of Art	311
	Bord de mer, Normandie		95 x 72	Private collection	312
	Bord de mer, Normandie		31 x 41	Private collection	313
	Massif de fleurs, jardin du Petit Gennevilliers	1884	61 × 46	Private collection Artnet	
	Vaches dans une pré		54 x 65	Private collection	317
	Le Rosier fleuri	1884-1885	53 × 37	Private collection Catalogue Dorotheum	
	Portrait de E.-J. Fontaine, Libraire	1885	56 x 82	Private collection	319
	Portrait of Jules Dubois	1885	117 x 89	Private collection	320
	Promenade au bord de la mer	1885	65 x 54	Private collection	322
	Arbres en fleurs, Petit Gennevilliers	c.1885	73 x 60	Brooklyn Museum	324
	Les Soleils, jardin du petit Gennevilliers	c.1885	130.5 x 105.8	Musée d'Orsay	
	Les Soleils, jardin du petit Gennevilliers	c.1885		Deji Art Museum, Nanjing	
	La Seine et le pont de chemin de fer d'Argenteuil		115 x 155	Brooklyn Museum	333
	Le pont d'Argenteuil et la Seine		65 x 82	Museum Barberini, Potsdam	334
	Soleils au bord de la Seine		92 x 73	Fine Arts Museums of San Francisco	336
	Bateaux au mouillage sur la Seine à Argenteuil		65 x 54	Nelson-Atkins Museum of Art, Kansas City, Missouri	348
	Portrait de Jean Daurelle		65 x 54	Musée d'Orsay, Paris	352
	Portrait de Jean Daurelle en pied	1887	75 x 50	Musée d'Orsay, Paris	353
	Paysage d'hiver	1887–1888	37 x 45	Israel Museum, Jerusalem	
	Linge séchant au bord de la Seine, Petit Gennevilliers		106 x 150	Wallraf-Richartz Museum, Cologne	368
	Pêcheur en barque		22 x 29	Private collection	386
	Bord de Seine à Argenteuil		54 x 56	Private collection	388
	Fabriques à Argenteuil		54 x 65	Private collection	390
	Portrait of Madame Renoir	c.1888	73 x 59	Private collection	391
	Portrait de femme assise, lisant		93 x 72	Private collection	392
	Portrait de Eugène Lamy, en buste (unfinished)		65 x 54	Private collection	394
	Paysage à Argenteuil	1889	60 x 73	Musée d'Art et d'Histoire Baron Gérard, Bayeux (deposit of Musée d'Orsay, Paris)	401
	Portrait de Eugène Lamy		82 x 65	Private collection	403
	Autoportrait	1889	55 x 46	Private collection	404
	La berge du Petit Gennevilliers et la Seine	1890	151 x 127	Private collection	406
	Voiliers sur la Seine à Argenteuil		65 x 82	Private collection	408
	Bateaux sur la Seine à Argenteuil	1890	60 x 73	Private collection	409
	Le petit bras de la Seine en automne	c.1890	65 x 54		416
	Bords de Seine		45 x 60	Private collection	432
	Autoportrait		40 x 32	Musée d'Orsay, Paris	436
	Bateaux à l'ancre sur la Seine	1892	73 x 60	Private collection	437
	Les dahlias, jardin du Petit Gennevilliers		157 x 114	National Gallery of Art, Washington	462
	Le bateau jaune	1891	72 x 92	Norton Simon Museum, Pasadena, California	467
	Chrysanthèmes blancs et jaunes, jardin du Petit Gennevilliers	1893	73 x 60	Musée Marmottan, Paris	488
	Parterre de marguerites (wall decoration composed of 7 canvasses and 17 fragments reunited)	c. 1893	2 panels of 205 × 116	Musée des Impressionnismes, Giverny	
	Cheval bai-cerise a l'écurie		31 x 43	Private collection	517
	Cheval bai-brun a l'écurie		39 x 33	Private collection	518
	A Haycart (Une Gerbière)		36 x 47	Private collection	546
	Bord de Seine au Petit-Gennevilliers		43.5 × 51.3	Musée Camille-Pissarro, Pontoise (deposit of Musée d'Argenteuil, Argenteuil)	
	La berge du Petit-Gennevilliers et la Seine		43.4 × 51.4	Musée d'art et d'histoire de Saint-Denis (deposit of Musée d'Argenteuil, Argenteuil)	
