= The Bezique Game =

Painting by Gustave Caillebotte

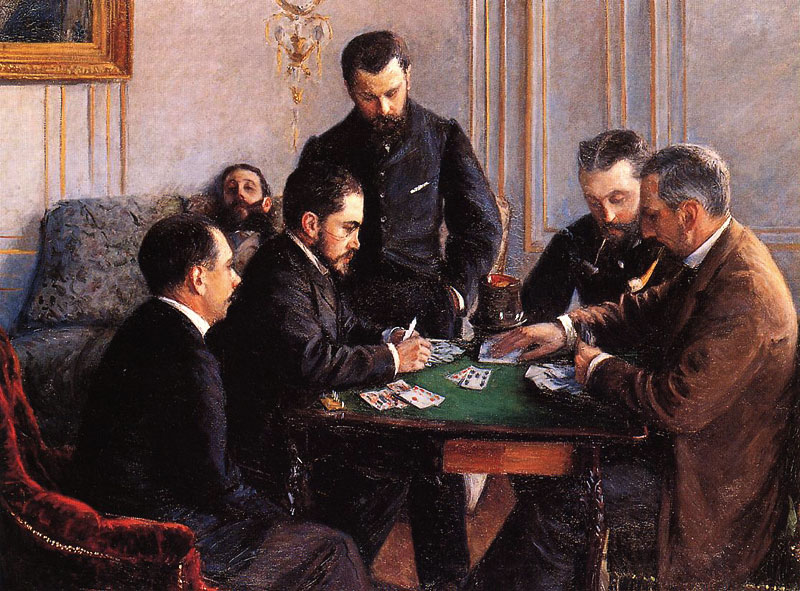
- Artist: Gustave Caillebotte
- Year: 1880
- Medium: Oil on canvas
- Dimensions: 121 cm × 161 cm (48 in × 63 in)
- Location: Louvre Abu Dhabi, Abu Dhabi, UAE

The Bezique Game (La partie de Bésigue) is an 1880 oil-on-canvas painting by the French impressionist artist Gustave Caillebotte (1848–1894). The work is now in the collection of the Louvre Abu Dhabi.

Eponymously it depicts a Bezique or Bésigue contest; bezique being a 19th-century French melding and trick-taking card game for two players.

It was displayed at the seventh Impressionist exhibition in 1882 and ran first in the catalogue.

Caillebotte set this depiction of his friends in the luxurious apartment on Boulevard Haussmann that he shared with his brother, the composer Martial Caillebotte, who is depicted in the picture smoking a pipe.

== See also ==
- List of paintings by Gustave Caillebotte
