= Portrait of Richard Gallo =

1881 painting by Gustave Caillebotte

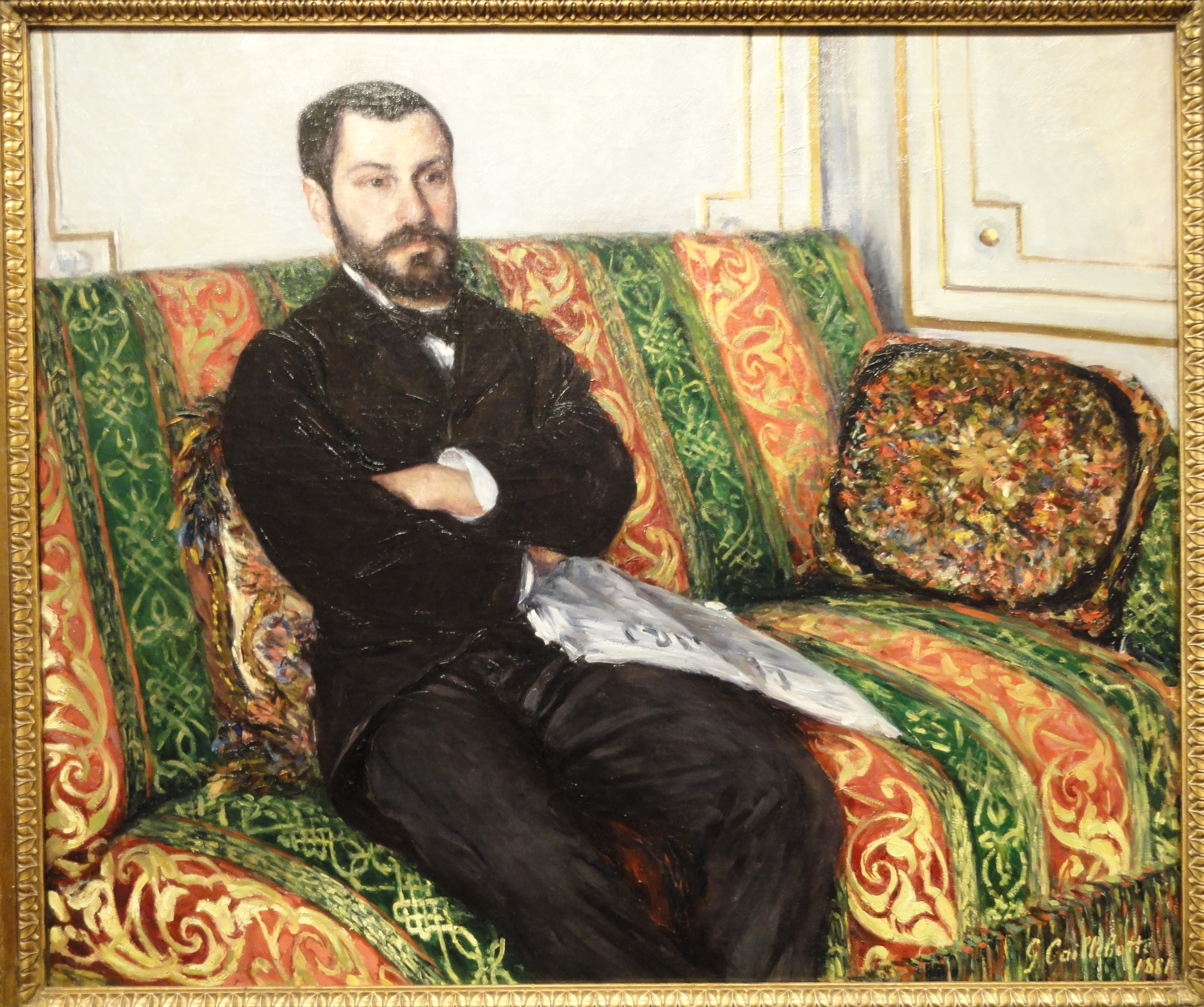
- Artist: Gustave Caillebotte
- Year: 1881
- Medium: oil on canvas
- Dimensions: 97.16 cm × 116.52 cm (38.25 in × 45.87 in)
- Location: The Nelson-Atkins Museum of Art; Kansas City

The Portrait of Richard Gallo is an oil-on-canvas painting by French painter Gustave Caillebotte in the Nelson-Atkins Museum of Art, Kansas City, Missouri. The painting measures 97 × 116 cm. and dates from 1881, and is part of a series of seven portraits of Richard Gallo, a childhood friend of the artist, composed between 1878 and 1884. According to Kirk Varnedoe, "This series demonstrates with great artistic coherence how personal contribution of the artist to express an impressionistic point of view on the modern world".

== Description ==
This portrait of 1881 shows a young man dressed elegantly in black, which contrasts with the muted colors of the sofa's fabric. The social position of the portrait subject, a member of the big bourgeoisie and the son of a banker, is suggested by the refinement of the decoration with gilded woodwork, the expensive fabric of the sofa, the care of his costume and the confident but reserved attitude he observes, arms crossed with a newspaper unfolded on the left thigh.

This newspaper evokes the function of Richard Gallo who came that year to enter as a journalist in the conservative and republican newspaper Le Constitutionnel, which his brother-in-law, Alcide Grandguillo, owned. However, the unfolded newspaper is not Le Constitutionnel, but a new competitor recently launched, Le Figaro, as an allusion to the competitive world of the French press of that time and the new law of 1881 on the freedom of the press which caused great debate that year. Richard Gallo then lived at 40 rue du Rocher in Paris, near the apartment of Gustave Caillebotte and his brother Martial of 31 Boulevard Haussmann, in a modern and prestigious district inhabited by the upper middle class of finance. Caillebotte also painted his friend with him in his studio in Autoportrait au chevalet (1879–1880) which proves their closeness and their agreement on the cultural, artistic and political life of that time.

This painting was exhibited at the last impressionist exhibition in 1882, but it went relatively unnoticed. The influence of the master of Caillebotte, Leon Bonnat, seen in the rendering of the face and the black suit, but the diagonal perspective (with the play of angle), the look of Richard Gallo and the decoration of arabesques and stripes of the fabric of the sofa, express the impressionist point of view of the artist.

== See also ==
- List of paintings by Gustave Caillebotte
