= A Balcony in Paris =

Painting by Gustave Caillebotte

Un balcon à Paris
- A Balcony in Paris (English)
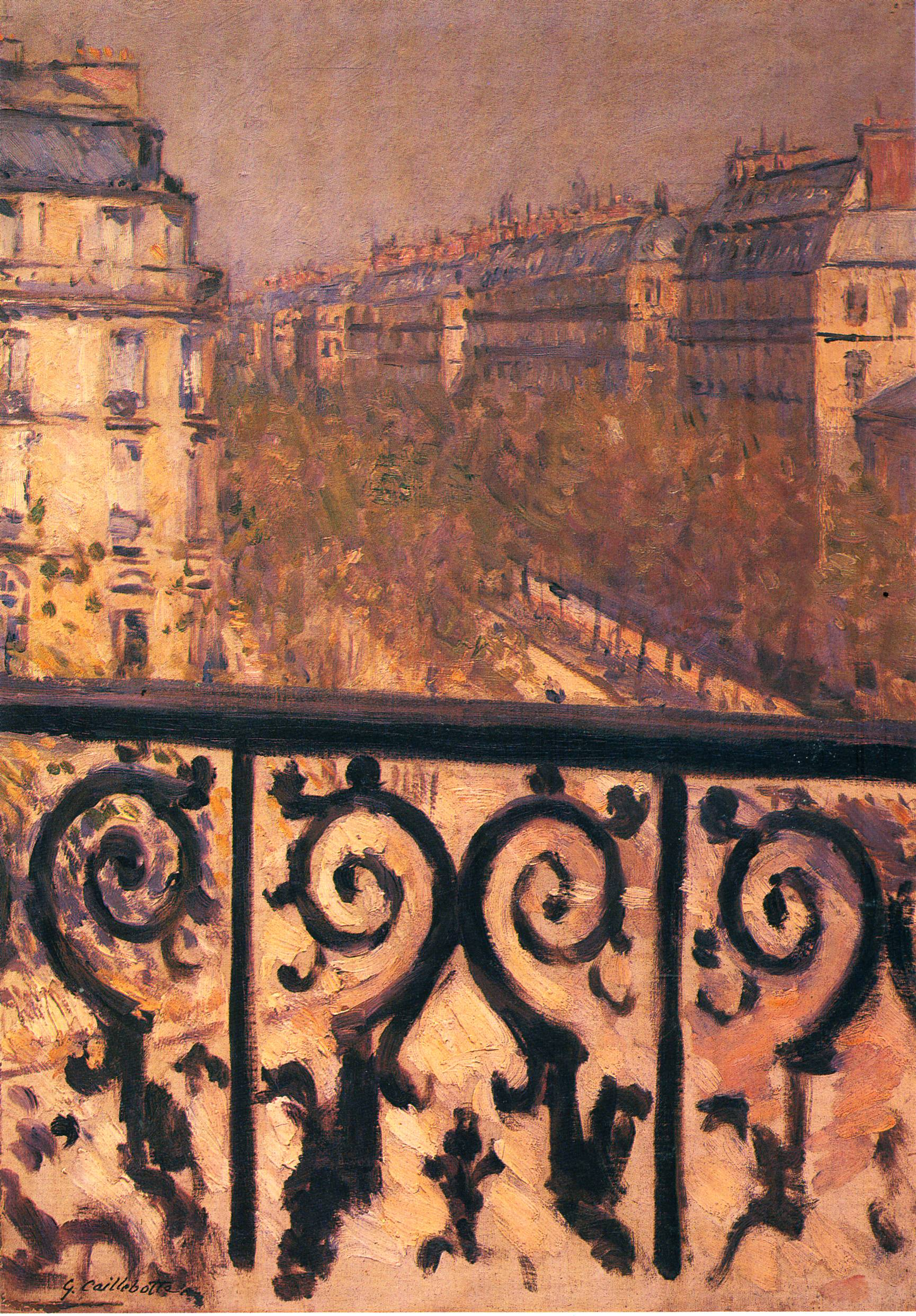
- Artist: Gustave Caillebotte
- Year: c. 1880–81
- Medium: Oil on canvas
- Dimensions: 55.2 cm × 39 cm (21.7 in × 15 in)
- Location: Private collection

A Balcony in Paris (French: Un balcon à Paris) is an oil-on-canvas painting executed c. 1880–1881 by the French Impressionist painter Gustave Caillebotte. The dimensions of the painting are 55.2 by 39 centimeters. It is housed in a private collection.

== Description ==
This painting is one of several by Caillebotte in which an urban street, viewed from a balcony, is seen through the spaces of an ornate iron grill in the foreground, differentiating the space of the street from the interior of his bourgeois home, 31 Boulevard Haussmann in Paris. The motif may have been inspired by similar juxtapositions seen in many Japanese ukiyo-e prints.

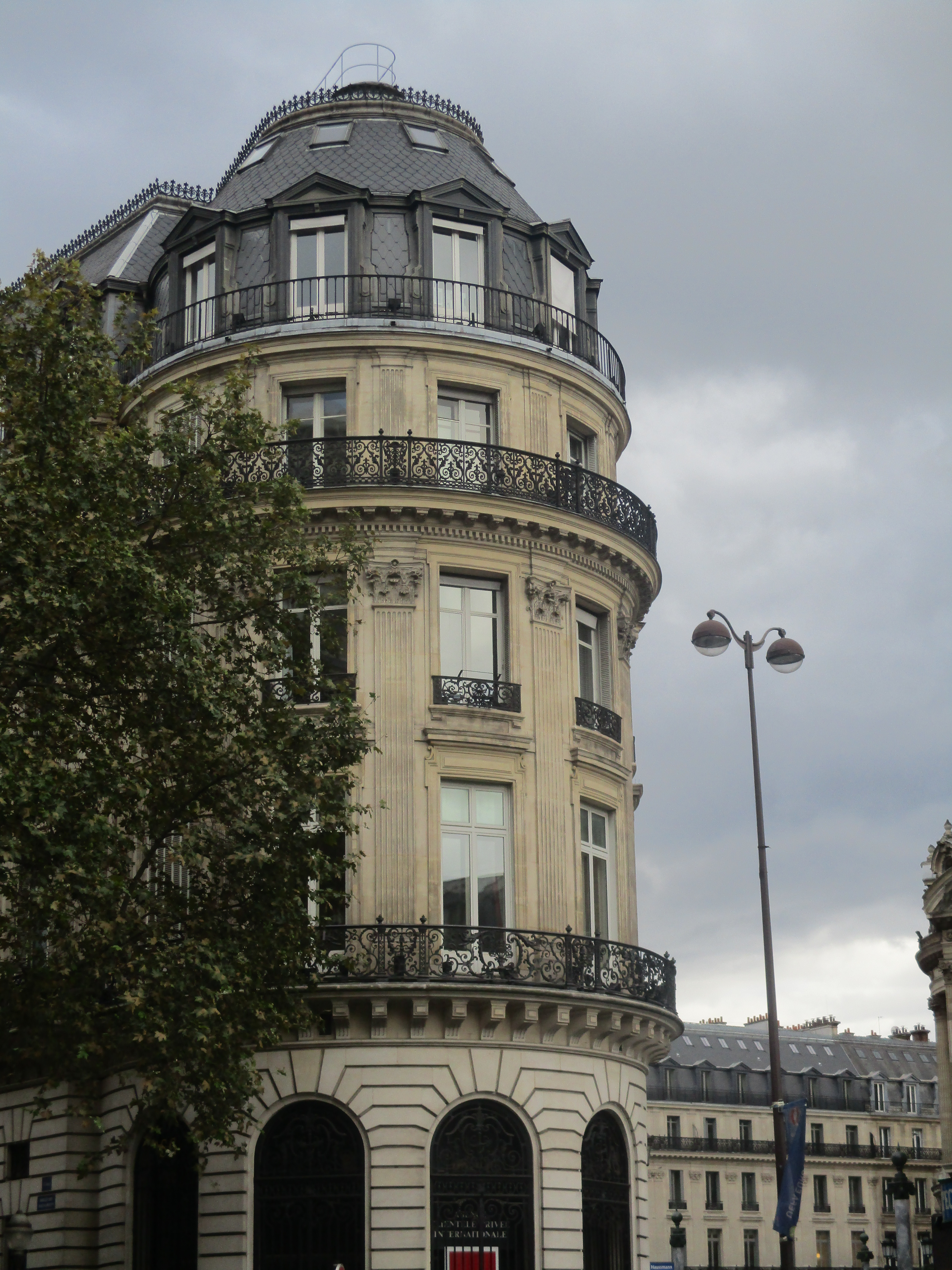
Gustave Caillebotte's 3rd story balcony

== Analysis ==
Caillebotte frequently used the motif of iron railings on Parisian balconies in his paintings. The abrupt cropping and bold composition is likely inspired by Japanese printmaking.

== See also ==
- List of paintings by Gustave Caillebotte
