= Skiffs (painting) =

1877 painting by Gustave Caillebotte

Skiffs (Périssoires)
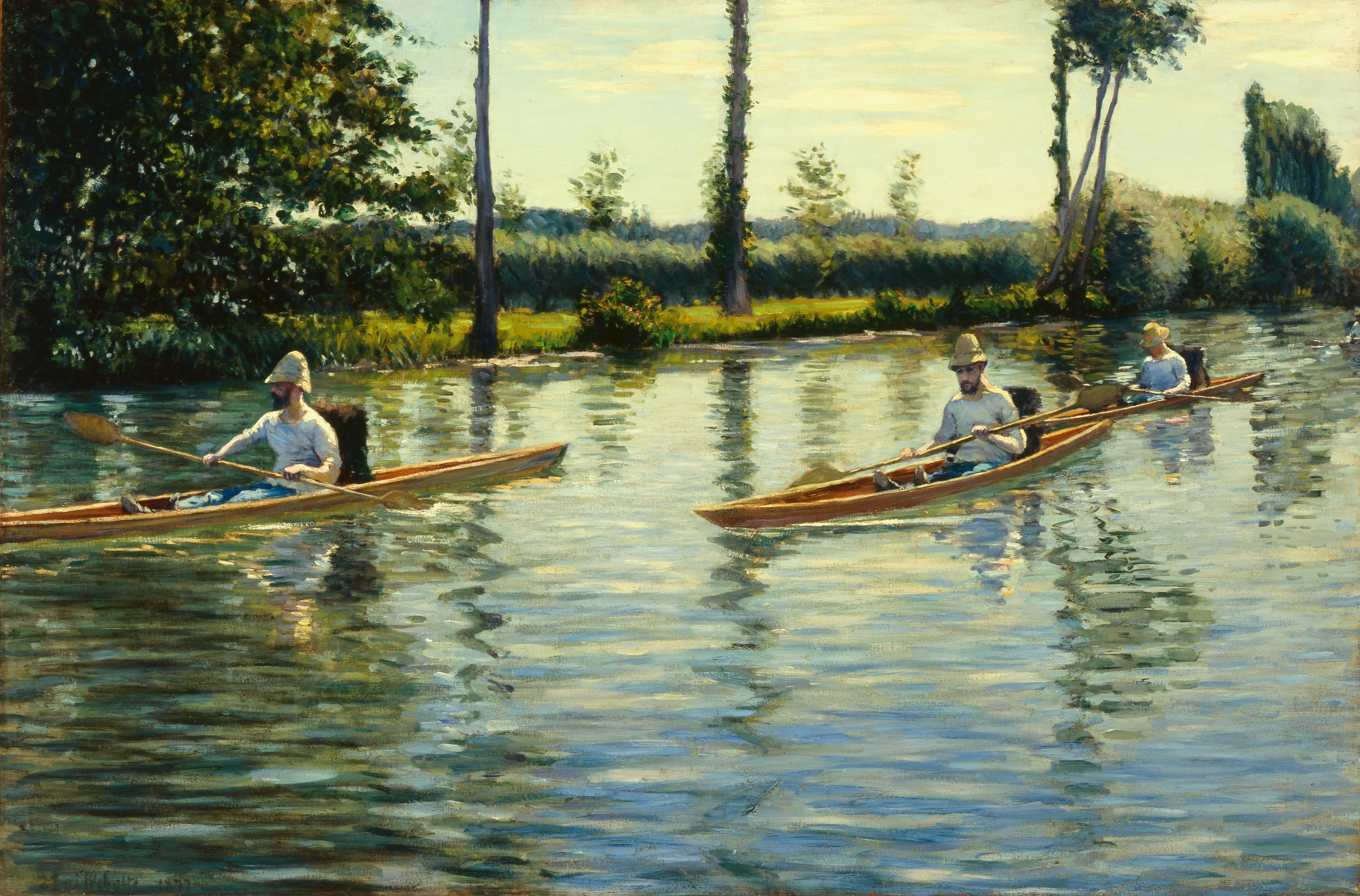
- Artist: Gustave Caillebotte
- Year: 1877
- Medium: Oil on canvas
- Movement: Impressionism
- Dimensions: 103.5 cm × 155.9 cm (40 3/4 in × 61 3/8 in)
- Location: Milwaukee Art Museum; Milwaukee

Skiffs^{α} (French: Périssoires), also known as Boating on the Yerres, is an oil painting by French impressionist and realist painter Gustave Caillebotte, completed in 1877.

== Description ==
From Urban Milwaukee:

"The three boats — sporty, kayak-like craft — glide on a stream that opens in a wedge shape. The tilt of the riverbank exaggerates the downhill flow of the water. The geometry of the painting, a rough wedge expanding from the top right to the lower left, promotes the sense of downward, leftward flow. The lead boat cuts an arrowhead of light into the shadow cast by the large tree."

This painting is one of the earliest and largest of the seven boating scenes that Caillebotte completed between 1877 and 1878 at his family's estate along the river Yerres.

== Influence ==
During the weeks leading up to Super Bowl XLV between the Green Bay Packers and the Pittsburgh Steelers, the Carnegie Museum of Art in Pittsburgh and the Milwaukee Art Museum made a friendly wager to loan one piece from their permanent collection to the winning team's museum, with the Carnegie Museum of Art agreeing to loan Pierre-Auguste Renoir's Bathers With Crab and the Milwaukee Art Museum agreeing to loan Skiffs.

== See also ==
- List of paintings by Gustave Caillebotte

== Notes ==
^α The painting is listed as Skiffs on the museum's official collection catalogue online. The painting was erroneously known as Boating on the Yerres in the past and consequently appears under the latter title in a number of published sources.
