= Homme au bain (painting) =

1884 painting by Gustave Caillebotte

- Man at His Bath (English)
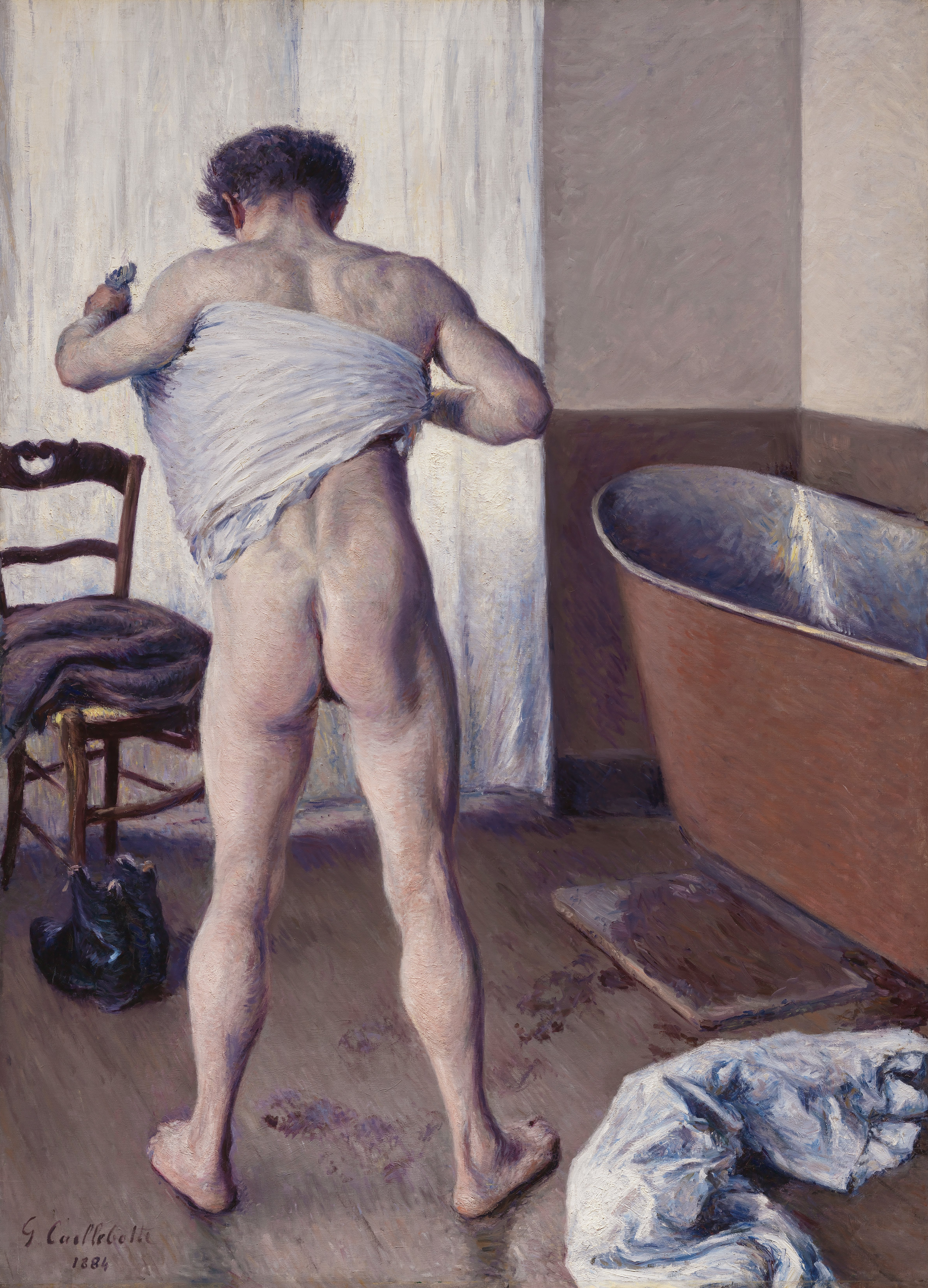
- Artist: Gustave Caillebotte
- Year: 1884
- Medium: Oil on canvas
- Dimensions: 144.8 cm × 114.3 cm (57 in × 45 in)
- Location: Museum of Fine Arts; Boston

Homme au bain (English title: Man at His Bath) is an 1884 oil painting by French Impressionist Gustave Caillebotte.

The canvas measures 145 by 114 centimetres (57 in × 45 in). It was held by the artist's descendants from the artist's death in 1894 until 1967 and in private collections until June 2011, when it was acquired by the Museum of Fine Arts, Boston.

== Description ==
The subject of the painting is a male nude. A man is seen drying himself, having just come from a large metal bathtub in the corner of a plain room. His clothes are folded and placed on a nearby wooden chair, alongside his boots. A towel or robe is lying on the floor next to the tub. The man has left wet footprints on the wooden floor. He is naked and observed from behind with his towel covering only the mid part of his back.

== Analysis ==
By this point in his career, Caillebotte had painted many images with great fidelity to realistic portrayals of people and their environment. As with his Les raboteurs de parquet (English title: The Floor Scrapers), Caillebotte did not attempt to show an idealized form of masculinity, but instead depicted a typical 19th-century male.

Interpretations of this work contrast the masculinity of the image with the figure's vulnerability. Male nudes were not commonly depicted in Impressionist images, though female nudes were an established theme. Feminist critics have argued that images of nude females at their toilette were associated with prostitution in the 19th-century France. Thus, this image challenges traditional notions of masculinity and gender norms in domestic settings.

== History and acquisition by the MFA ==
Caillebotte created this work in 1884. He sent the painting to be exhibited at the Les XX show of 1888 in Brussels. The painting was controversial enough that it was removed from public view and placed in a small and inaccessible room. The painting was held by Caillebotte's heirs until it passed to another family, and then to a private collection in Switzerland in 1967.

In preparation for its Degas and the Nude exhibition in 2011, the Museum of Fine Arts, Boston (MFA), decided to purchase the painting, which it already had held on loan since earlier that year. The painting was bought for approximately $17 million ($24.3 million in 2025). The chairman of the museum's European art department realized that they would be extremely unlikely to obtain donor funding for the purchase, because the painting depicted a male nude – difficult subject matter for attracting donors. To raise the funds, the MFA "deaccessioned" (sold) eight other paintings in its collection. The move was controversial, as the eight pieces had been given to the museum as gifts from benefactors. Those paintings were also by artists more recognized to the general public than the lesser-known Caillebotte: they included work by Monet, Renoir and Gauguin. Others defended the move by the MFA: Boston Globe editor Dante Ramos said acquiring the Caillebotte was "the kind of bold, adventurous move that a world-class museum ought to be making", while noting that there may not have been many benefactors willing to donate "a painting showing some random guy's naked butt." The painting became the museum's first Impressionist nude, and joined the one other work by Caillebotte, the still life Fruits sur un étalage.

The deaccessioned paintings were sold at two auctions at Sotheby's in November 2011 for a total of $18.72 million ($26.79 million in 2025). They were:

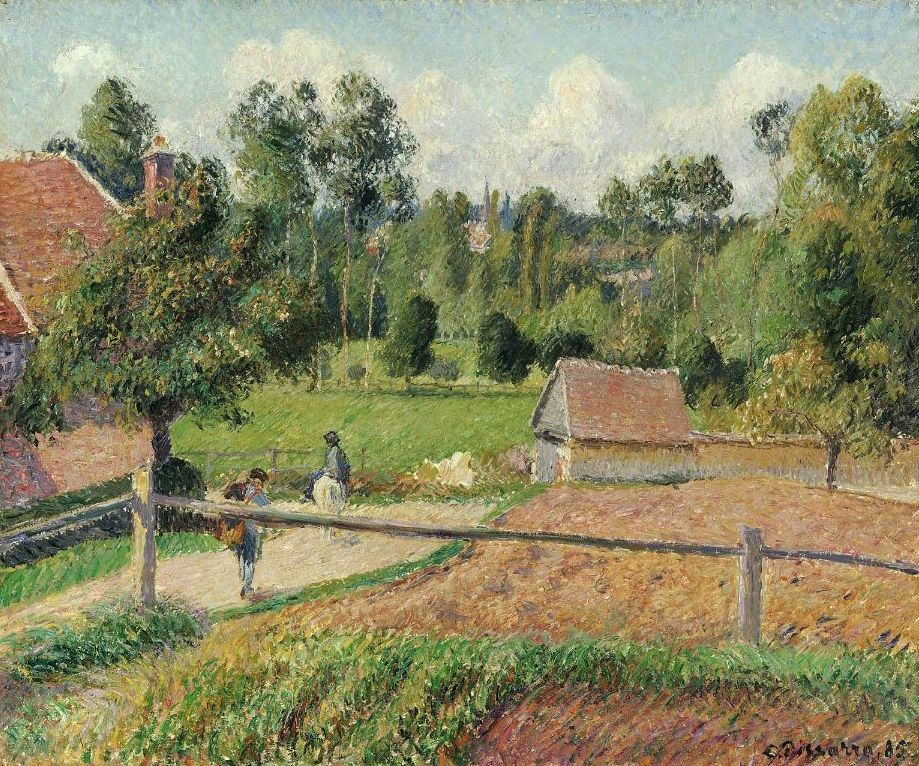
View from the Artist's Window, Eragny, Camille Pissarro, 1885

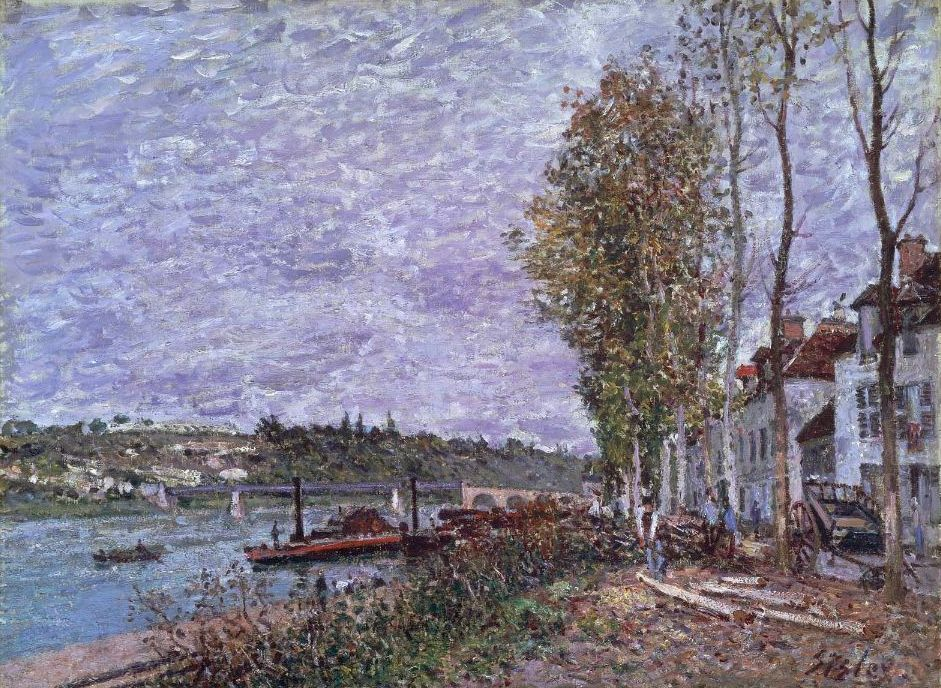
Overcast Day at Saint-Mammès, Alfred Sisley, c. 1880

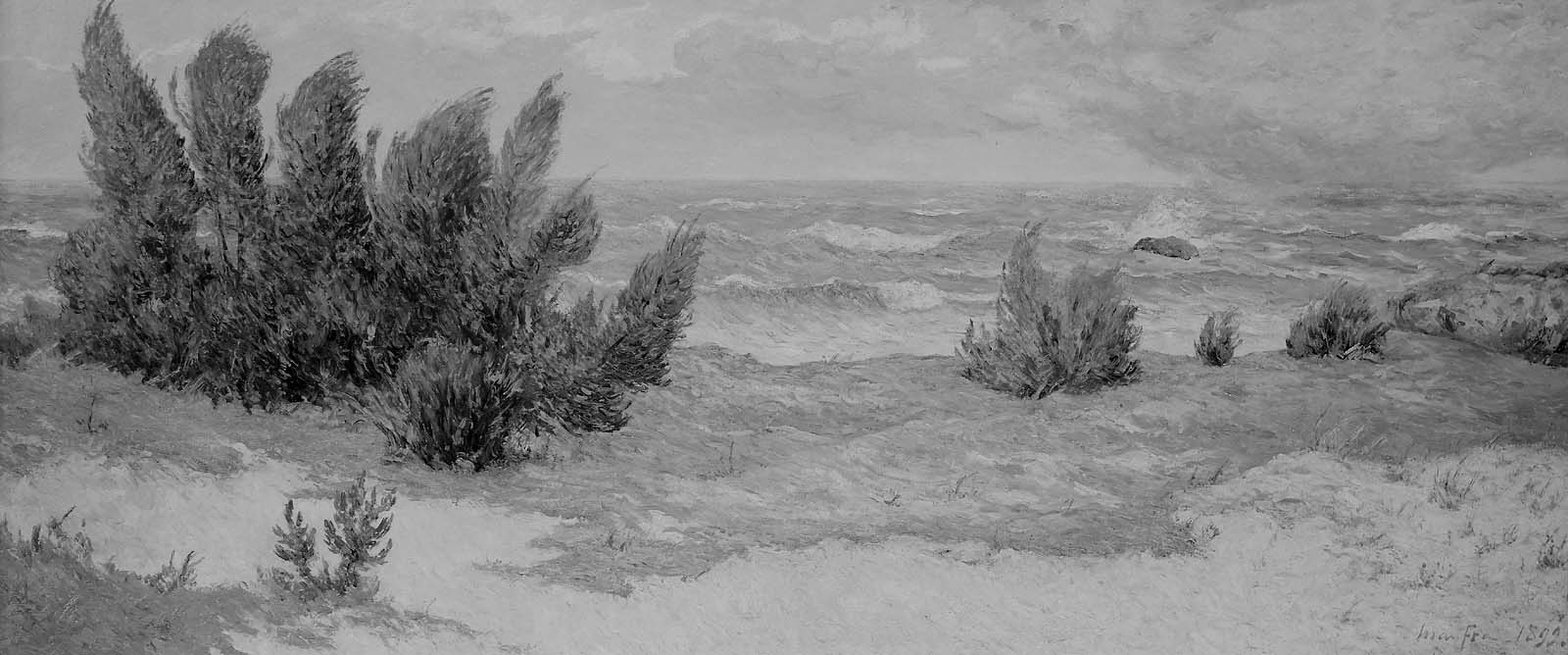
Gust of Wind, Maxime Maufra, 1899

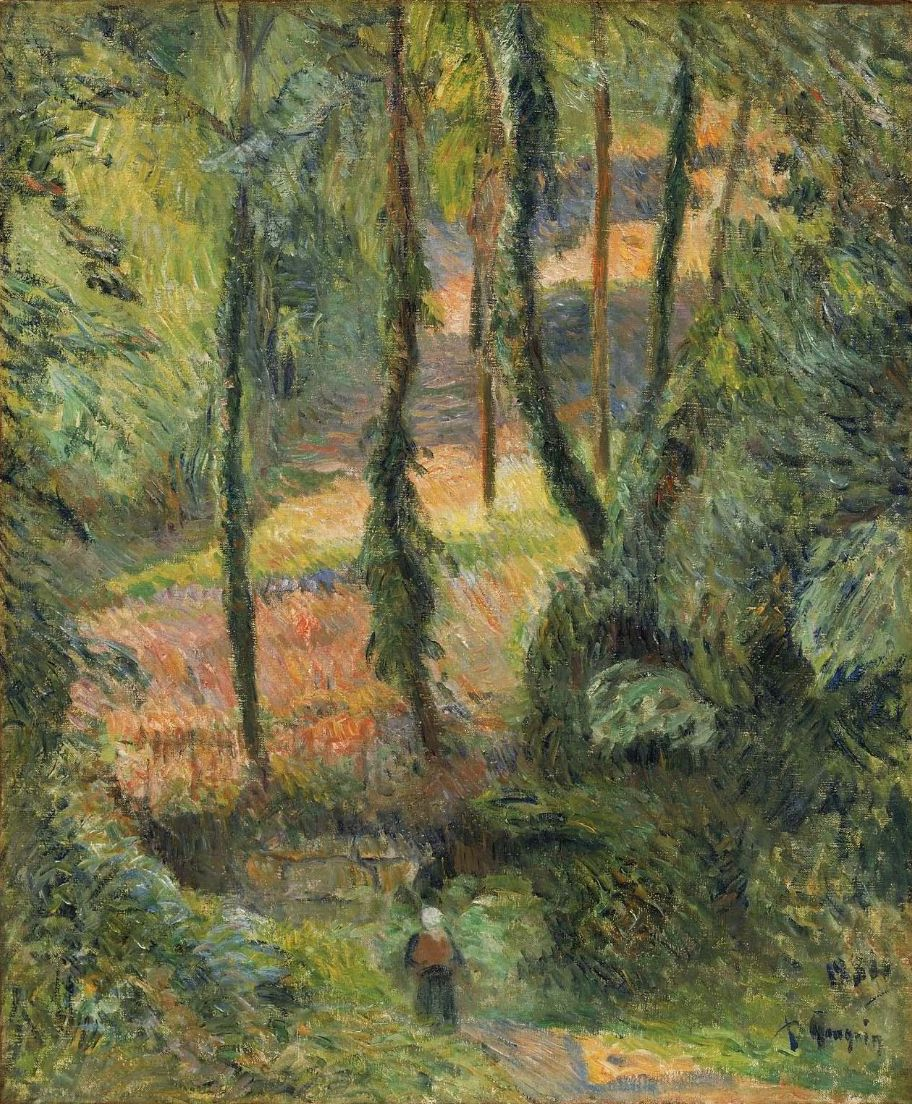
Forest Interior (Sous-Bois), Paul Gauguin, 1884

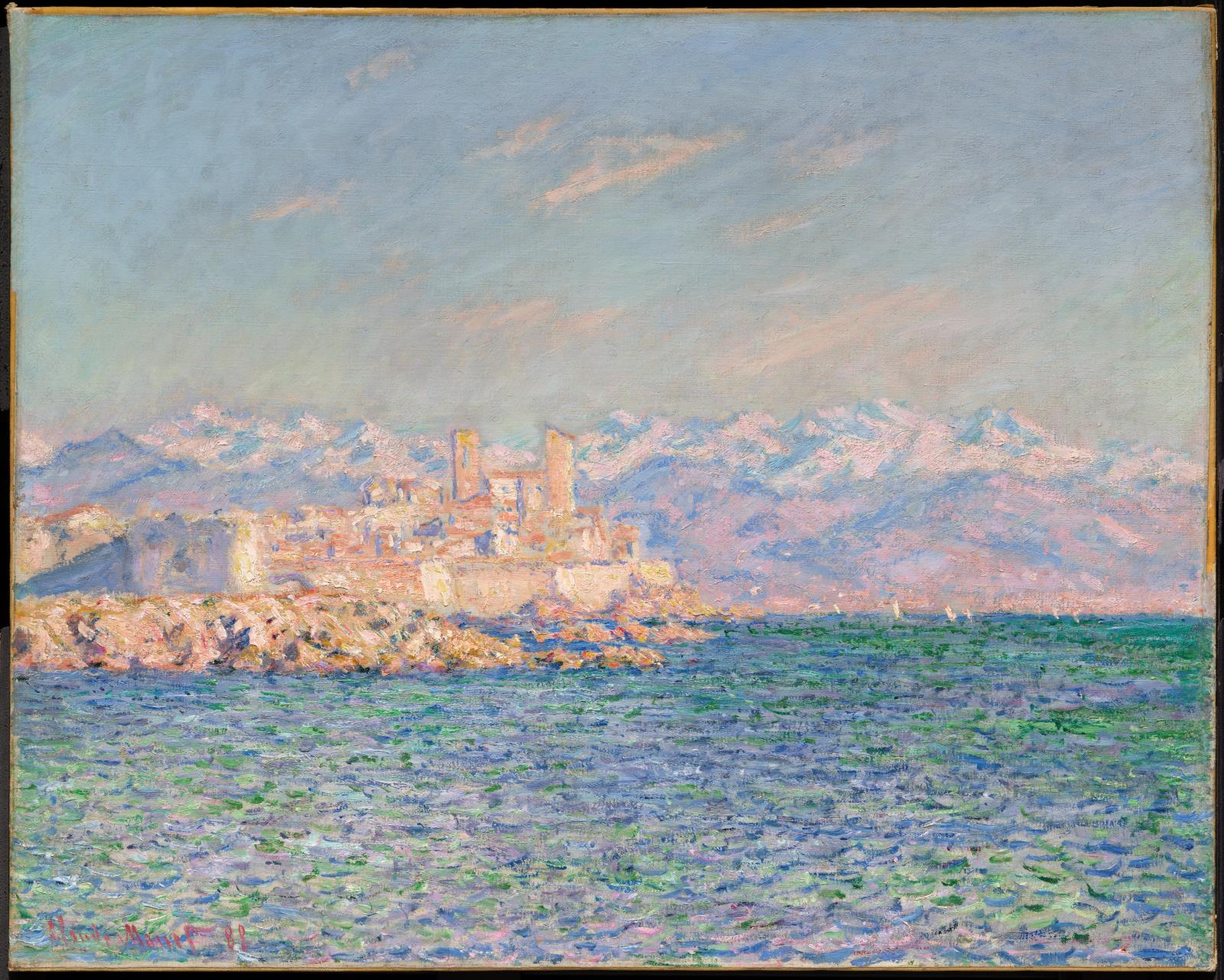
The Fort of Antibes, Claude Monet, 1888

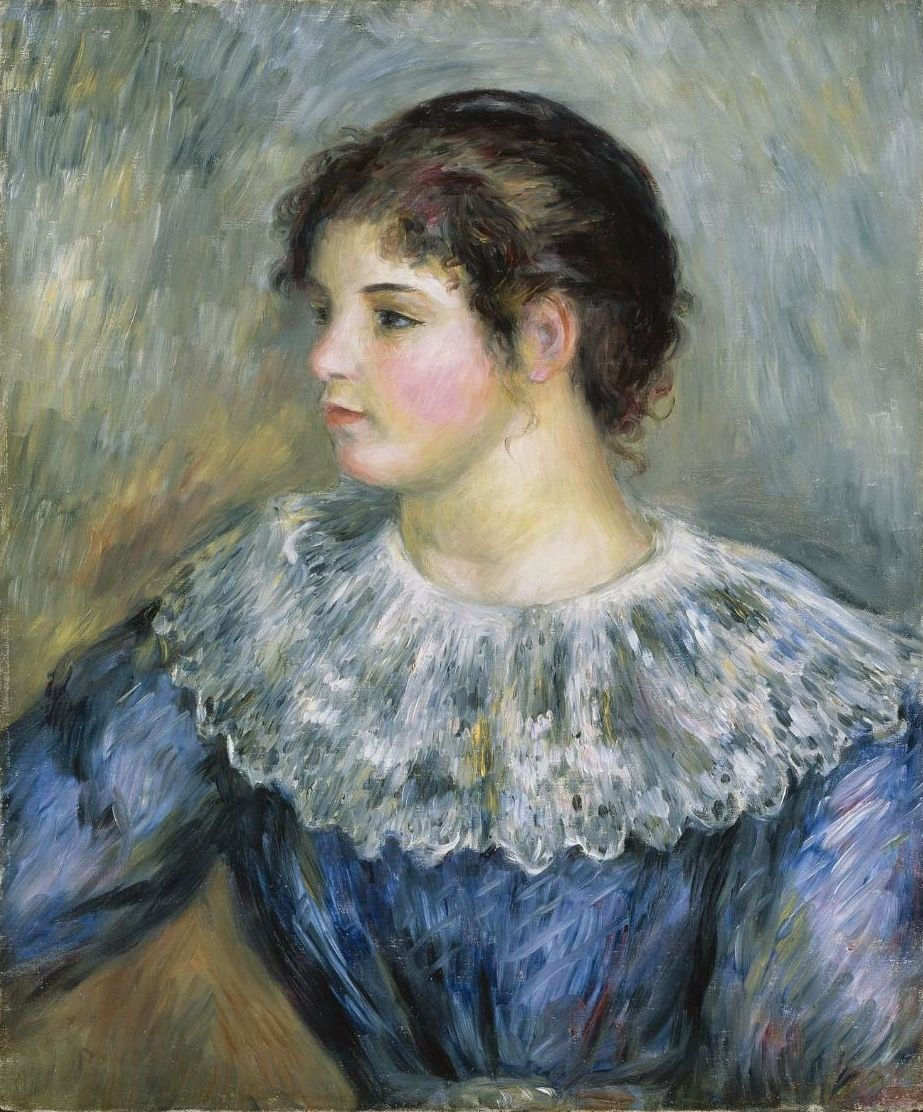
Bust Portrait of a Young Woman, Pierre-Auguste Renoir, c.1890

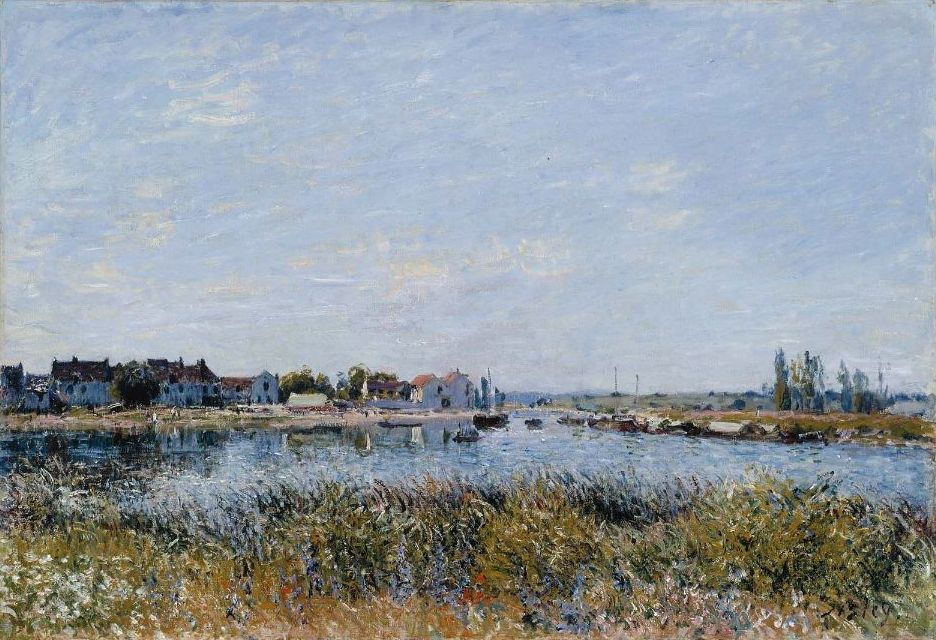
Saint-Mammès: Morning (Le Matin), Alfred Sisley, 1881

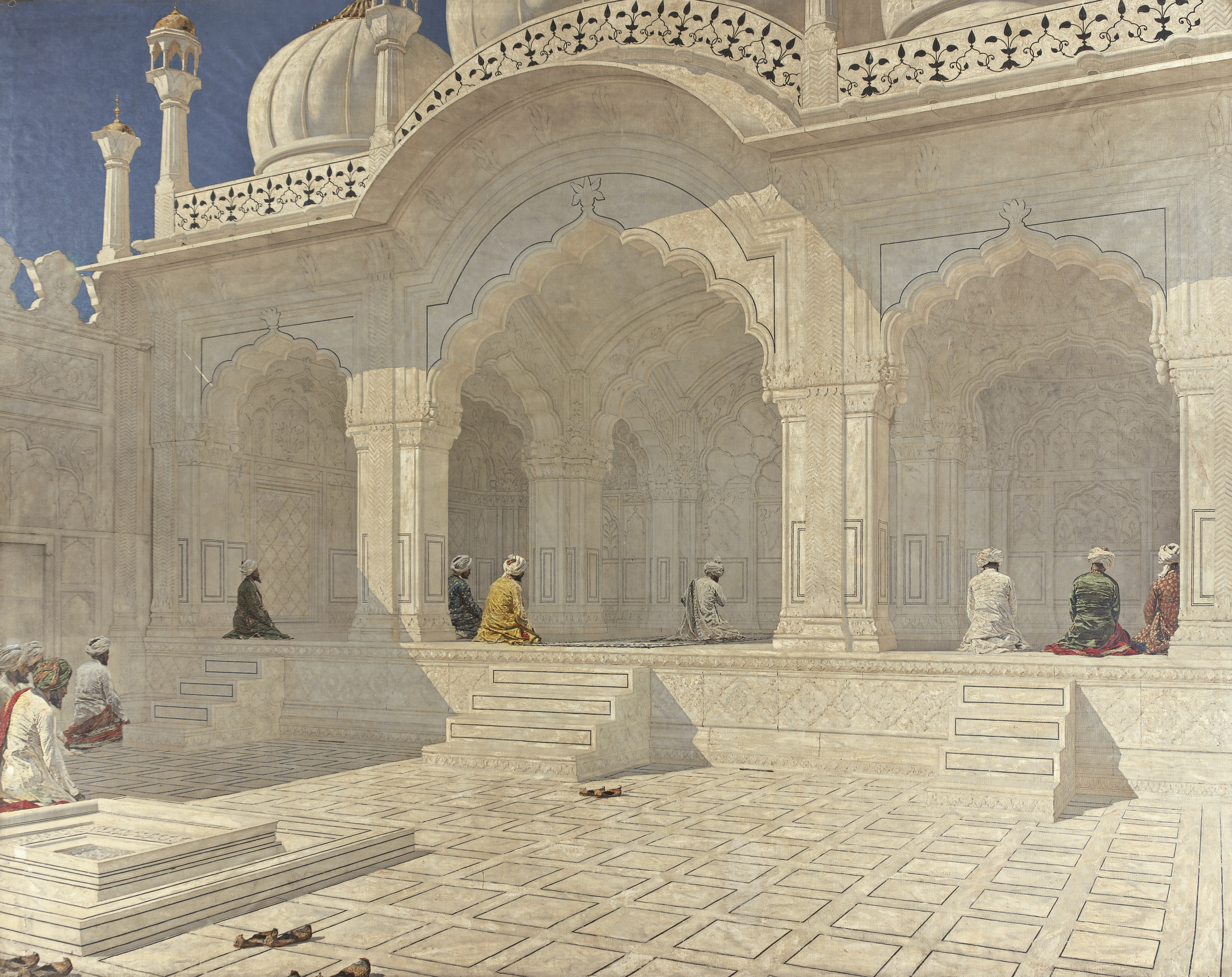
Pearl Mosque, Delhi, Vasily Vereshchagin, late 1880s

== See also ==
- List of paintings by Gustave Caillebotte
