= Les raboteurs de parquet =

1875 painting by Gustave Caillebotte

- The Floor Scrapers (English)
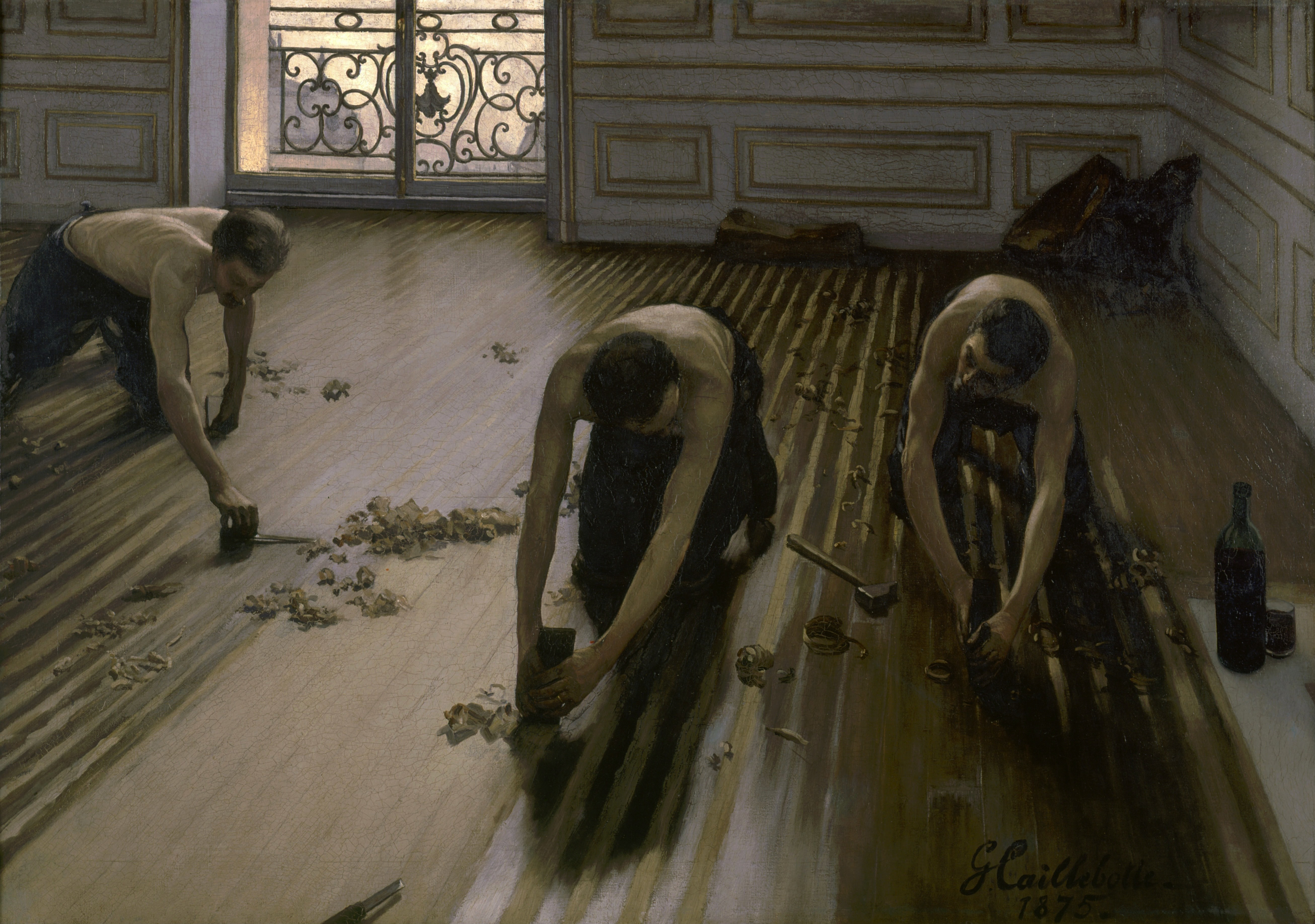
- Artist: Gustave Caillebotte
- Year: 1875
- Medium: Oil on canvas
- Dimensions: 102 cm × 146.5 cm (40 1/8 in × 57 5/8 in)
- Location: Musée d'Orsay, Paris
- Accession: Don, 1894
- Website: www.musee-orsay.fr/en/artworks/raboteurs-de-parquet-105

Les raboteurs de parquet (English title: The Floor Scrapers) is an oil painting by French Impressionist Gustave Caillebotte. The canvas measures 102 by 146.5 centimetres (40.2 in × 57.7 in). It was originally given by Caillebotte's family in 1894 to the Musée du Luxembourg, then transferred to the Musée du Louvre in 1929. In 1947, it was moved to the Galerie nationale du Jeu de Paume, and in 1986, it was transferred again to the Musée d'Orsay in Paris, where it is currently displayed.

== Composition ==
Caillebotte's originality lies in his attempt to combine the careful drawing, modeling and exact tonal values encouraged by the Académie with vivid colors, bold perspectives, keen sense of natural light and modern subject matter of the Impressionist movement. Painted in 1875, this work illustrates Caillebotte's continued interest in perspective and everyday life. In the scene, the observer stands above three workers on hands and knees, scraping a wooden floor in a bourgeois apartment—now believed to be Caillebotte's own studio at 77, rue de Miromesnil, in the 8th arrondissement of Paris. A window on the back wall admits natural light. The workers are all shown with nude torsos and tilted heads, suggesting a conversation.

Caillebotte's interest in the male nude, set in a modern context, has been linked to his presumed homosexuality; it was part of a larger trend, not necessarily limited to homosexual artists, that was first introduced by Courbet in a painting of two wrestlers. This is one of the first paintings to feature the urban working class. It reintroduces the subject of the male nude in the painting, but in a strikingly updated form. Instead of the heroes of antiquity, here are the heroes of modern life—sinewy and strong—in stooped poses that would appear demeaning if they did not convey a sense of masculine strength and honest labor. There is a motif of curls in the image, from the wood shavings on the floor, to the pattern of ironwork in the window grill to the arched backs and arms of the workers. The repetition in the image, with the three workers engaged in different aspects of the same activity but having similar poses, is similar to works by Caillebotte's contemporary, Edgar Degas.

== Exhibition and reception ==
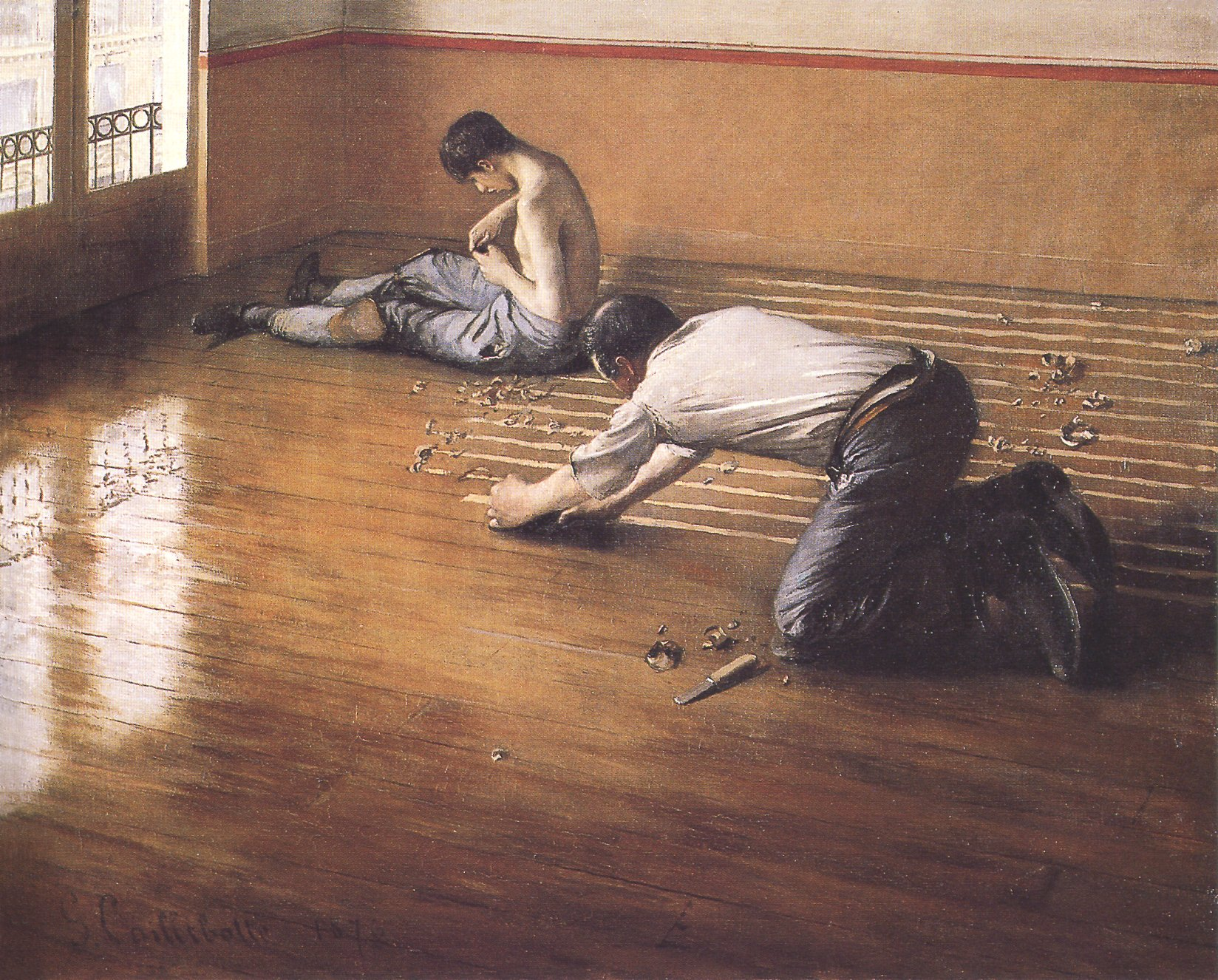
1876 version of the same subject by Caillebotte

Despite the effort Caillebotte put into the painting, it was rejected by France's most prestigious art exhibition, the Salon, for the Salon of 1875. The depiction of working-class people in their trade, not fully clothed, shocked the jurors and was deemed a "vulgar subject matter". He was hurt by this rejection, and instead showed it at the second exhibition of the Impressionists, with whom he had already associated himself, in 1876. He presented it alongside some of his other works, including a second, different version of Raboteurs from 1876, and his earlier work Jeune homme à sa fenêtre (Young Man at His Window). The images of the floor scrapers came to be associated with Degas's paintings of washerwomen, also presented at the same exhibition and similarly scorned as "vulgar".

The painting divided opinion in Paris art circles. Among the detractors, Emile Porchoron, a critic of Impressionism, damned Caillebotte with faint praise: "the least bad of the exhibition. One of the missions Impressionism seems to have set for itself is to torture perspective: you see here what results can be obtained." Émile Zola praised the technical execution, but then called it "an anti-artistic painting, painting as neat as glass, bourgeois painting, because of the exactitude of the copying." Louis Énault was not troubled by the depiction ("The subject matter is certainly vulgar, but we can understand how it might tempt a painter") but did find fault with the image's fidelity to the scene: "I only regret that the artist did not choose his types better... The arms of the planers are too thin, and their chests too narrow... may your nude be handsome or don't get involved with it!"

The painting received praise from many critics, though. Regarding the Salon rejection, poet and critic Émile Blémont called the decision "[a] very bad mark for the official jurors". Marius Chaumelin compared Caillebotte favorably to his contemporaries, writing that the work showed that he was "a realist just as raw, but much more witty, than Courbet, just as violent, but altogether more precise, than Manet." Philippe Burty made comparisons to an even earlier generation of artists: "His pictures are original in their composition, but, more than that, so energetic as to drawing that they resemble the early Florentines."

== Cultural depictions ==
- Les Raboteurs, choreography by Angelin Preljocaj, music by Thierry Lancino, film by Cyril Collard (co-production with Musée d'Orsay, La Sept, Opus 10-19; 1988).

== See also ==
- List of paintings by Gustave Caillebotte

== Notes ==
External videos
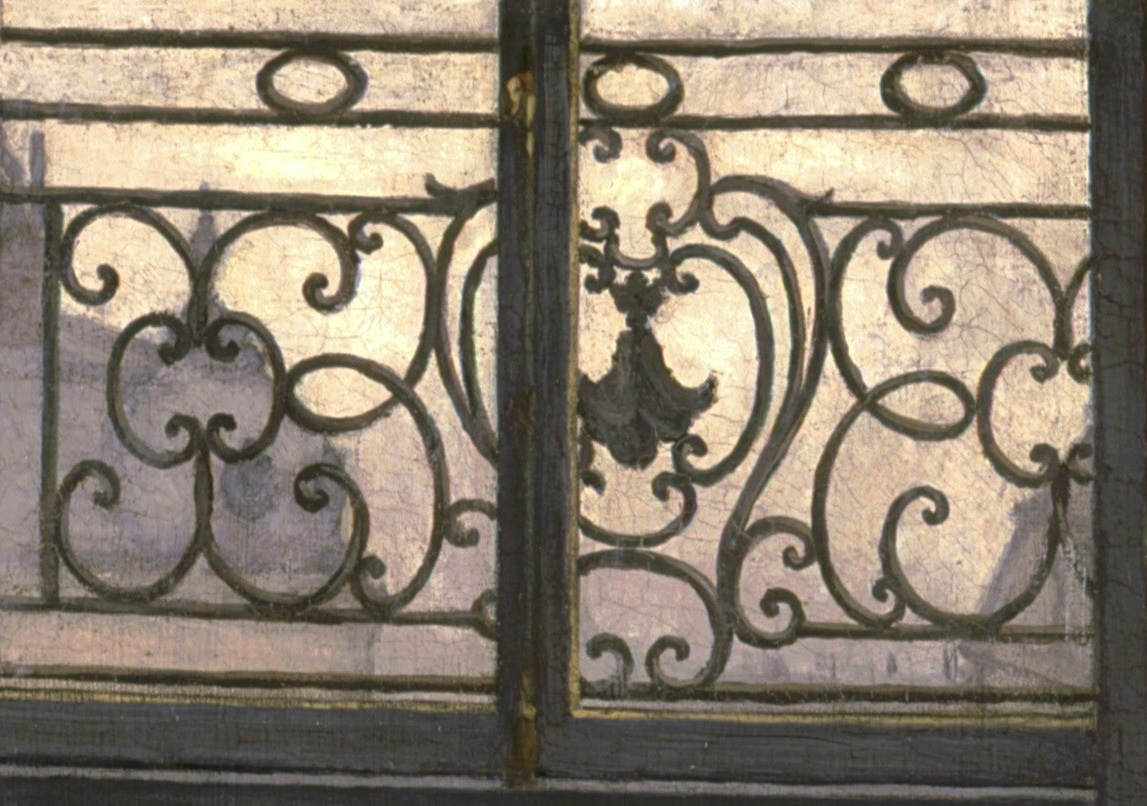
- Caillebotte's The Floor Scrapers, Smarthistory
