= Young Man at His Window =

1876 painting by Gustave Caillebotte

Jeune homme à sa fenêtre
- Young Man at His Window (English)
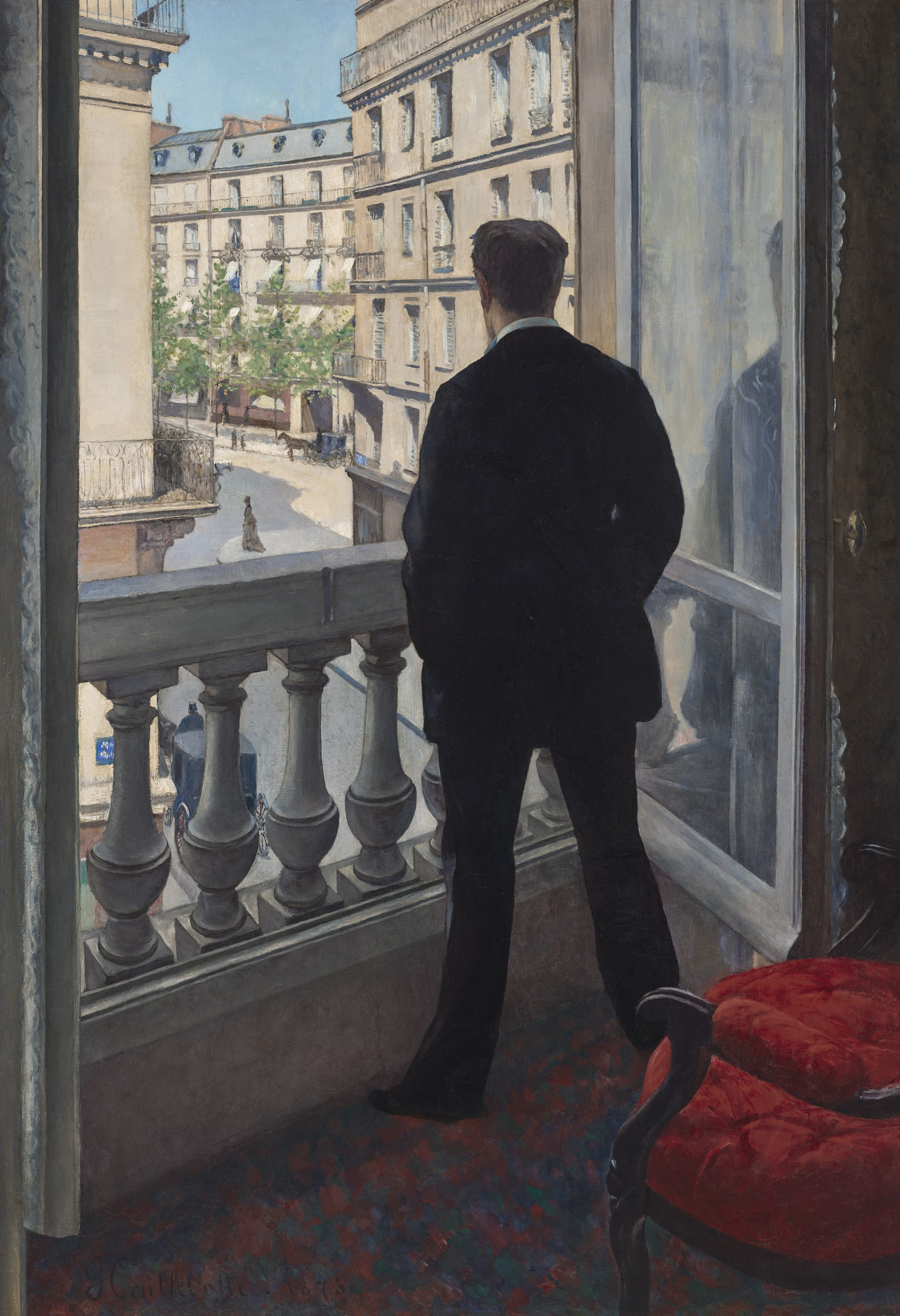
- Artist: Gustave Caillebotte
- Year: 1876
- Catalogue: 2021.67
- Medium: Oil on canvas
- Dimensions: 117 cm × 82 cm (46 in × 32 in)
- Location: J. Paul Getty Museum; Los Angeles

Young Man at His Window (French: Jeune homme à sa fenêtre) is an 1876 painting by the French Impressionist Gustave Caillebotte (1848–1894). The oil on canvas painting measures 117 by 82 centimetres (46 in × 32 in). It is in the collection of the J. Paul Getty Museum in Los Angeles.

== Description ==
The painting depicts the artist's brother, René Caillebotte, wearing informal clothes and standing at a balcony. He is standing at a window from the family home in the Rue de Miromesnil in Paris, looking outwards into Boulevard Malesherbes (the large, oblique cross-street in the background). It is a comparatively early work in Caillebotte's oeuvre and reveals his interest in urban Realism.

In its theme of a figure seen from behind at an open window, the composition has precedents in German Romanticism, a notable example being Caspar David Friedrich's Woman at the Window (1822). Other examples include Goethe at the Window (1787) by Johann Heinrich Tischbein and The Morning Hour (1857–1860) by Moritz von Schwind.

Caillebotte's painting differs from his German antecedents in several ways, however. The man does not gaze upon nature, but rather looks out upon an urban scene. According to the art historian Kirk Varnedoe, "a standard charm of the window view is our bemused curiosity as to what the observer is looking at; but Caillebotte's structure replaces this curiosity with something quite different." By placing the onlooking man off-center and depicting him from a somewhat elevated viewpoint, Caillebotte's painting creates a tense relationship between the dominant foreground figure, the emphatic perspectival diagonals, and the detailed street scene beyond. Varnedoe says "the normal interior-exterior oppositions of the window are thus combined in a charged relationship, competitive or covalent, that is seemingly unprecedented".

Caillebotte presented this painting at the Impressionism exhibition of 1876 alongside a few of his other works, including Les raboteurs de parquet. Writer Émile Zola was impressed with technical achievement of the works, but was not enthusiastic about the style: "Photography of reality which is not stamped with the original seal of the painter's talent—that's a pitiful thing." He called the painting "anti-artistic... because of the exactitude of the copying."

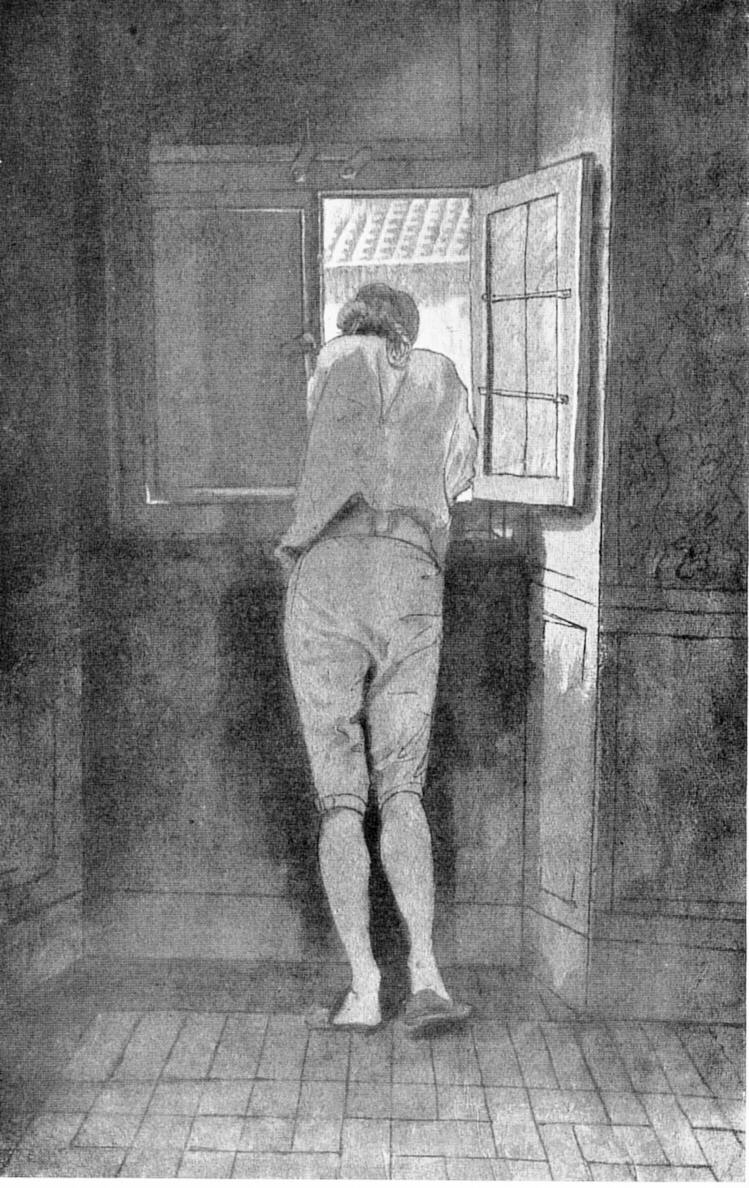
Johann Heinrich Tischbein, Goethe at the Window, 1787

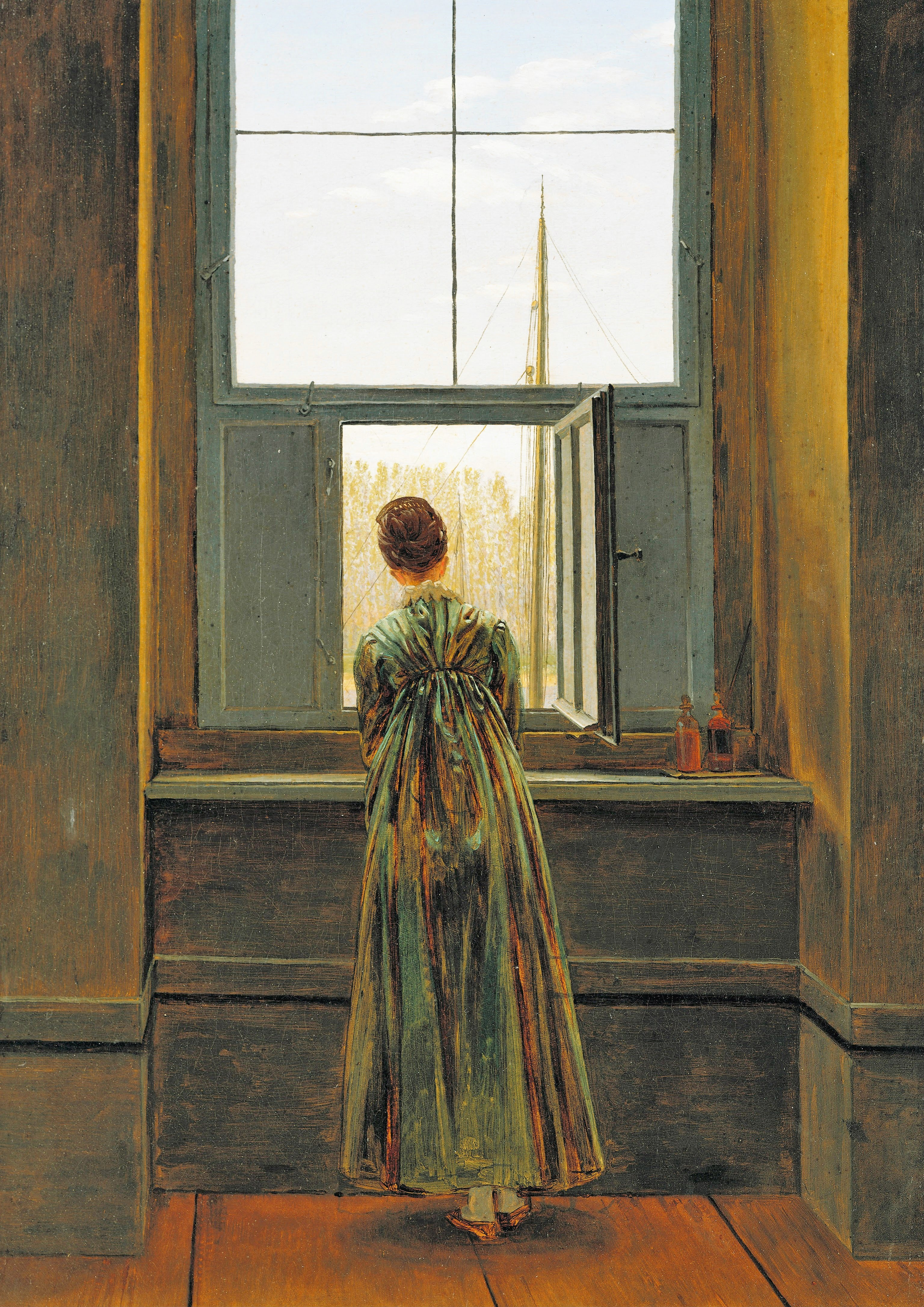
Caspar David Friedrich, Woman at a Window, 1822

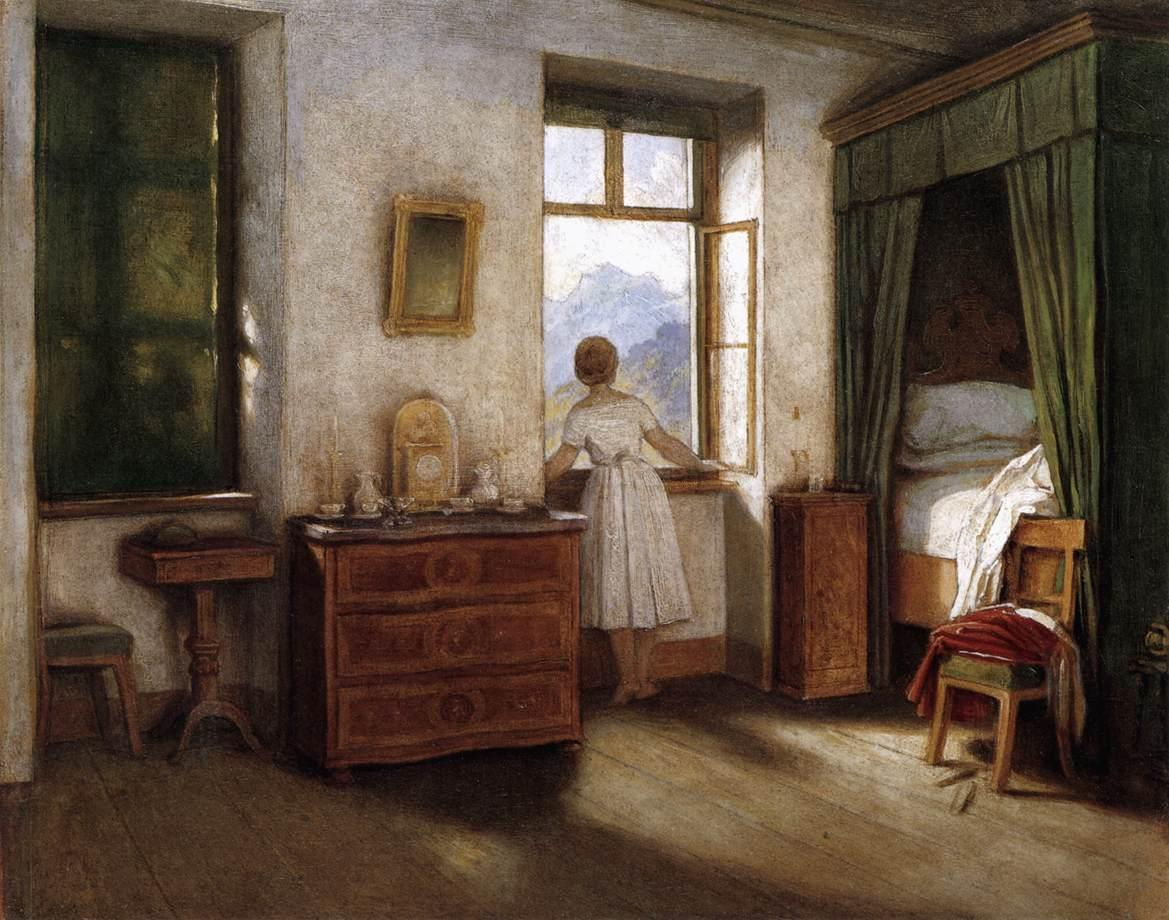
Moritz von Schwind, Early Morning, 1858

== Acquisition ==
In 2021, Young Man at His Window (a National treasure of France) was sold by the estate of Edwin L. Cox at auction at Christie's New York to the collection of the J. Paul Getty Museum in Los Angeles for $53 million ($63 million in 2025) or €48.9 million (€55.9 million in 2023), marking the Getty's first Caillebotte work. This surpassed the 2019 record for a Caillebotte work of $22 million for Rising Road (1881) achieved at Christie's.

== See also ==
- List of paintings by Gustave Caillebotte
