= Boating Party =

1878 painting by Gustave Caillebotte

- Partie de bateau (French)
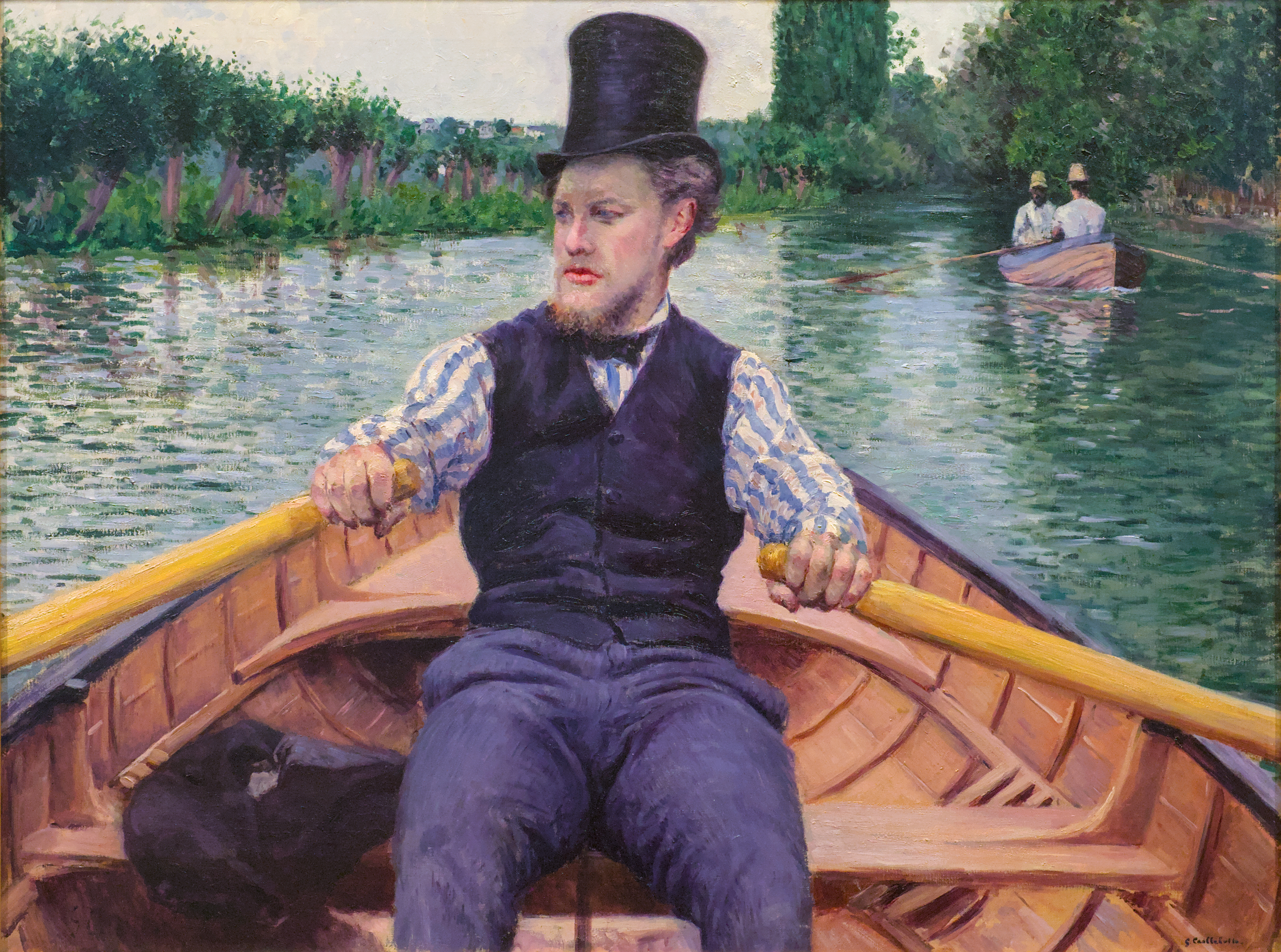
- Artist: Gustave Caillebotte
- Year: 1877–78
- Medium: Oil on canvas
- Dimensions: 89.5 cm × 116.7 cm (35.2 in × 45.9 in)
- Designation: National treasure of France (2020)
- Location: Musée d'Orsay, Paris
- Accession: RF MO P 2022 5
- Website: www.musee-orsay.fr/fr/oeuvres/partie-de-bateau-265643

Boating Party (French: Partie de bateau), also known as The Boating Party (French: La Partie de bateau) or Oarsman In A Top Hat (French: Canotier au chapeau haut de forme), is an oil painting by the French painter Gustave Caillebotte. The painting is from a period in Caillebotte's career when he was producing water-related works due to his extensive boat collection, his enjoyment of rowing, making use of his family's summer home which was close to the Yerres River. The work is noted for its close-up action perspective, which is regarded as unusual for large paintings. Caillebotte first showed the work in the Fourth Impressionist Exhibition in Paris in 1879.

The painting remained in the artist's collection until his death. It remained in Caillebotte's family for the next 128 years, beginning with his brother Martial Caillebotte and passing to Martial's descendants. The work was finally acquired by the Musée d'Orsay in Paris in 2022 and unveiled in 2023. The acquisition was featured in the French Republic's nationwide celebration of the 150th anniversary of Impressionism and was part of both a nationwide and an international exhibition tour which marked the 130th anniversary of Caillebotte's death in 2024. The painting is considered a national treasure of France.

== Description ==
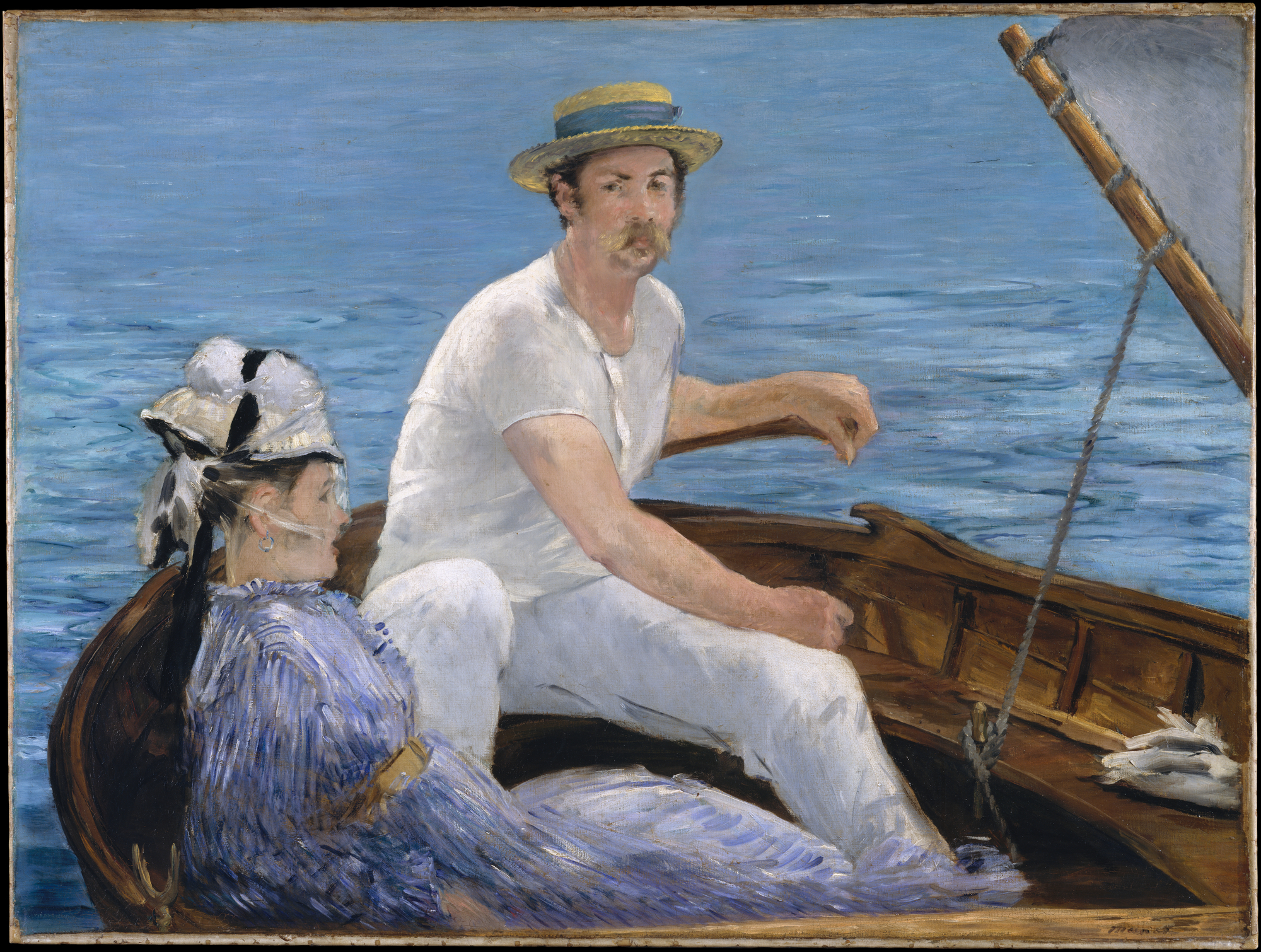
It is compared favorably to Boating, 1874, Édouard Manet.

Boating Party is an oil painting on canvas, measuring 89.5 cm × 116.7 cm (35.2 in × 45.9 in). It depicts an oarsman rowing a boat on the Yerres River, while wearing a black top hat. The scene is near the Caillebotte family's summer home that Gustave enjoyed from the age of twelve. At the time, rowing was a novel form of leisure for the urban upper class. The model for the work remains unknown, although there is some speculation that it could be painter Norbert Goeneutte, who had previously posed for Renoir. The manner of dress of the oarsman is considered to be elegant, and the setting is described as a part of the Île-de-France region. He is wearing a top hat; his jacket is folded beside him.

Caillebotte's depiction of shimmering water is also praised. His use of perspective is said to be superior to that of Édouard Manet's in Boating (1874), giving Boating Party a more realist feel and drawing in the viewer. This view is echoed by others who believe the viewer is given the feeling of being in the boat instead of observing the boat. Christophe Leribault, President of the Musée d'Orsay at the time of the acquisition, noted that Caillebotte drew on his personal boating experience and gave the viewer the perspective of a passenger with an almost cinematic close-up of the physical exertion.

The work demonstrates Caillebotte's ability to capture the effects of natural light on water.

== Background ==
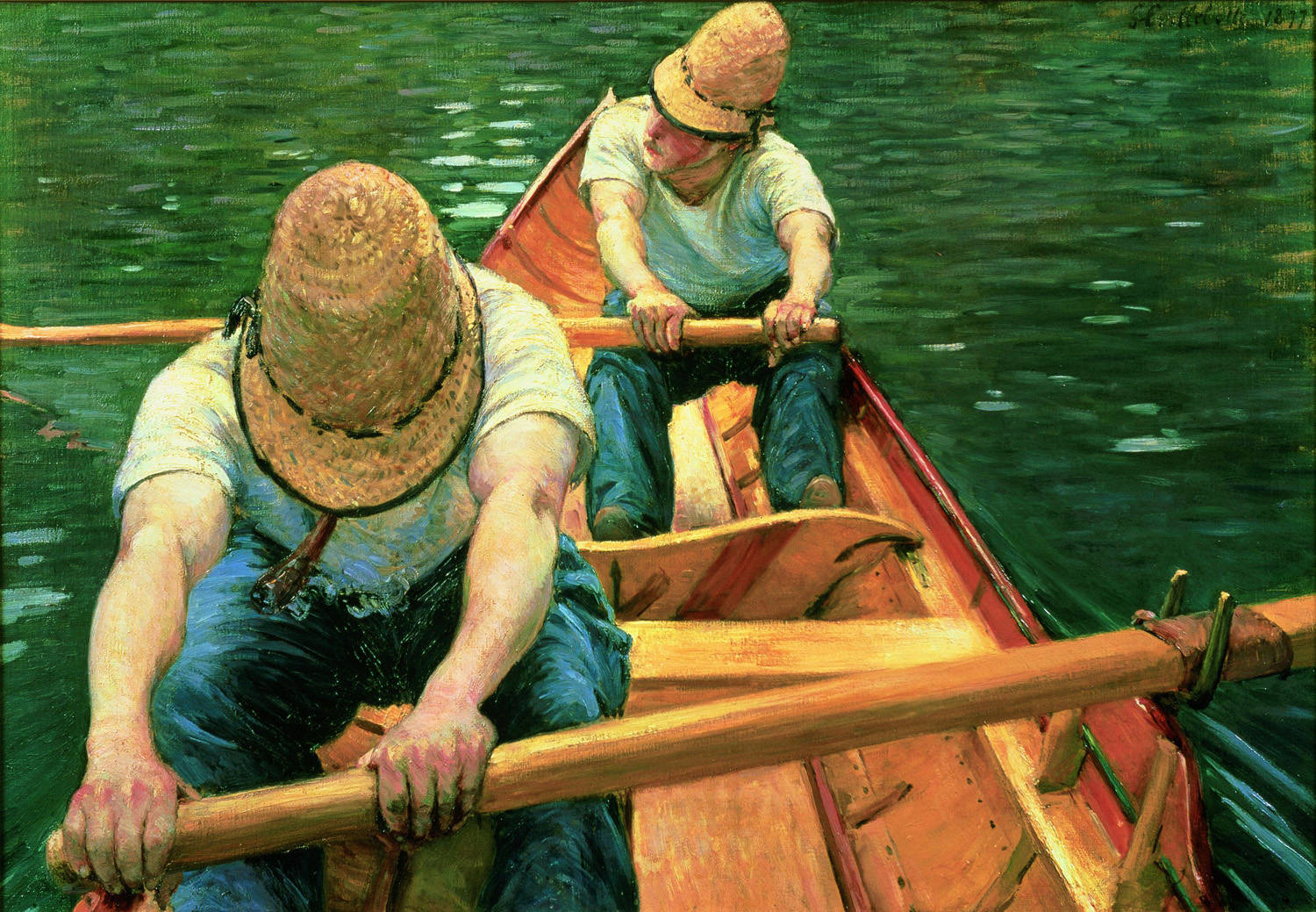
Oarsmen Rowing on the Yerres (1877), a similar subject by Caillebotte

Caillebotte owned 32 boats, and impressionists such as Monet, Renoir, and Manet had already executed similar boating scenes in the 1870s. At the time, canoeing was a popular leisure activity. Caillebotte was unique among the leading impressionists in that his work focuses on depictions of the male form. He depicted the activities and attire of contemporary men in scenes of everyday life. He made this rowing work distinct from his peers' by its close-up perspective, which differed from Monet and Renoir, who had included the subject as part of broader landscape works, and Manet, who depicted scenes related to before and after rowing activity. The First Impressionist Exhibition opened on 15 April 1874. In 1875, Les raboteurs de parquet (English title: The Floor Scrapers) was rejected by the Salon.

Caillebotte's debut as an artist came at the Second Impressionist Exhibition in 1876, with eight of his works, including Les raboteurs de parquet. Other highlights of that submission included Young Man at His Window, Young Man Playing the Piano, and Luncheon. Boating Party is a work sent by Caillebotte to the Fourth Impressionist Exhibition in 1879. He submitted a total of 35 paintings and pastels to the 1879 exhibition. Boating Party was considered one of the best. This group, which is focused on "water sports, boating and riverside leisure", is described as the most important exhibition of his works in his lifetime. Other works from this period of his career that also depict rowing include Skiffs (1877), Boating on the Yerres (1877), Skiff on the Yerres River (1878), and Les Périssoires (1878).

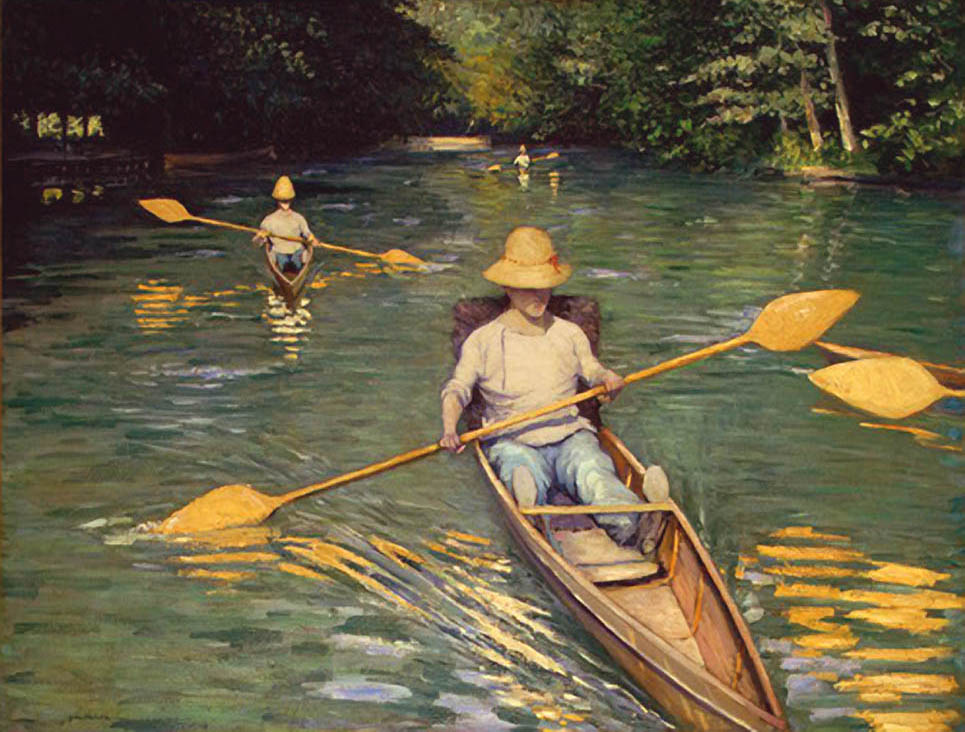
Skiffs, 1877, National Gallery of Art

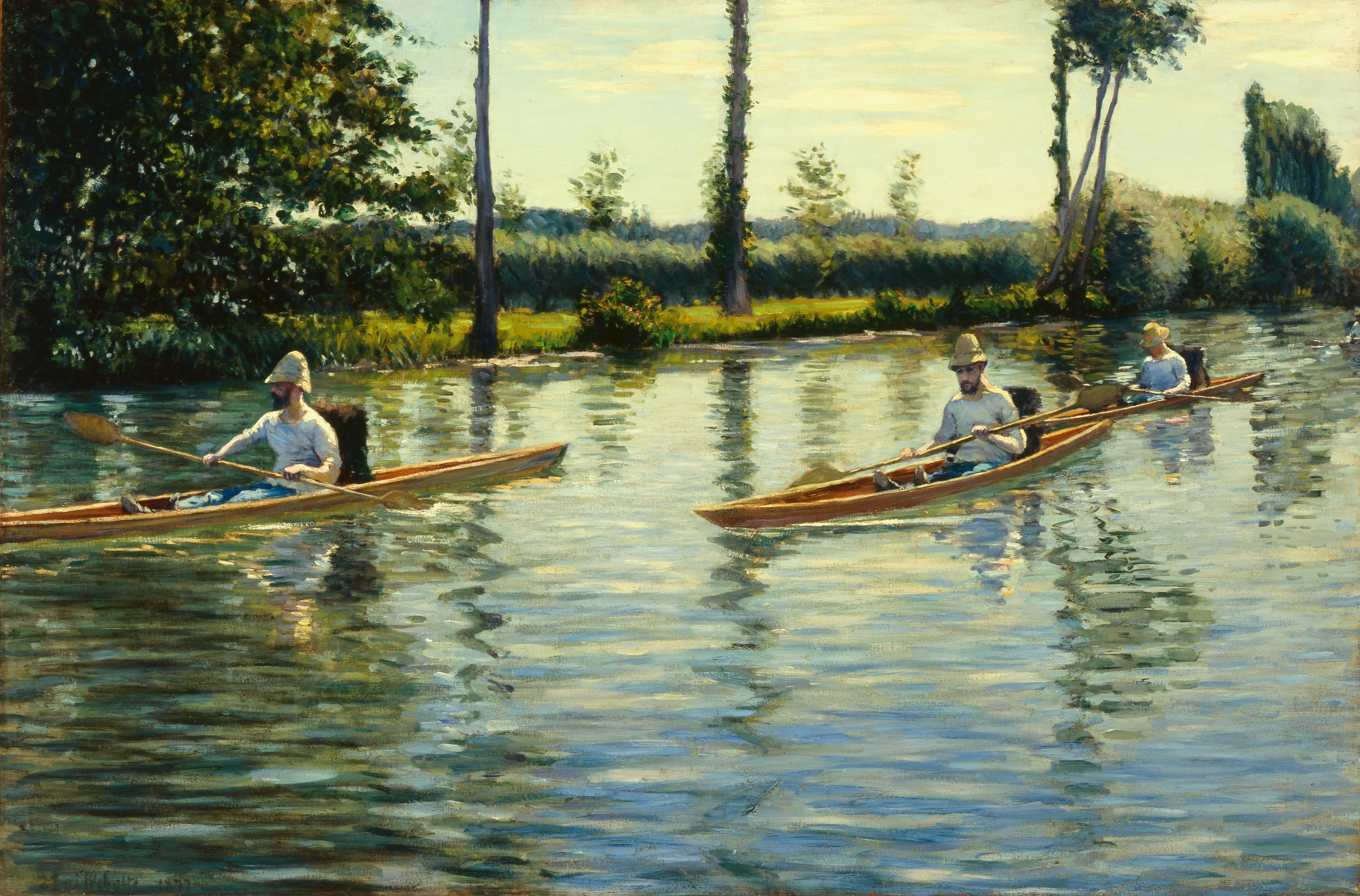
Boating on the Yerres, 1877, Milwaukee Art Museum

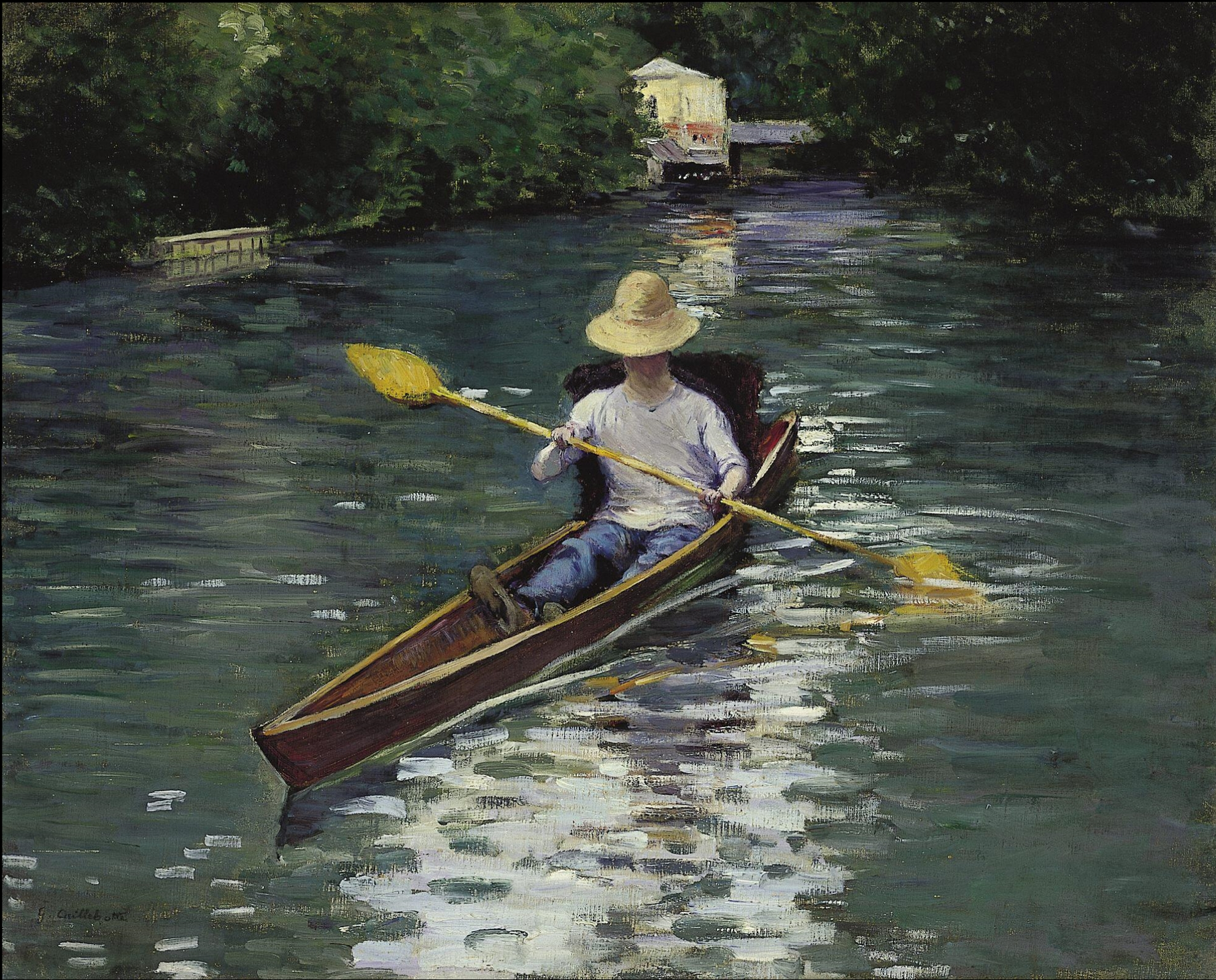
Skiff on the Yerres River, 1878, Norton Simon Museum

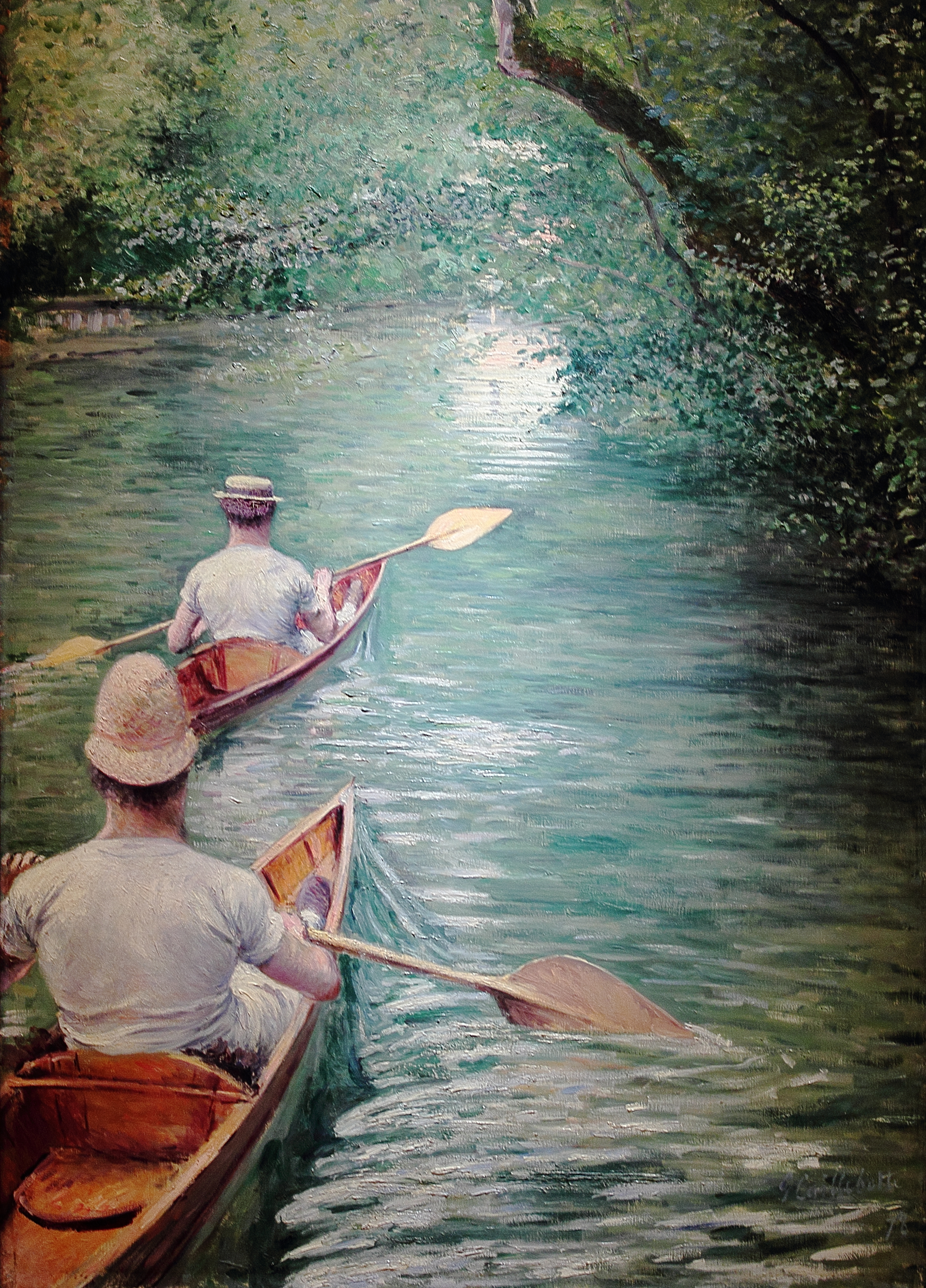
Les Périssoires, 1878, Museum of Fine Arts of Rennes

Several years later, Renoir famously depicted Caillebotte in Luncheon of the Boating Party (1881). Caillebotte continued to create works with sailing themes for the remainder of his career.

== History ==
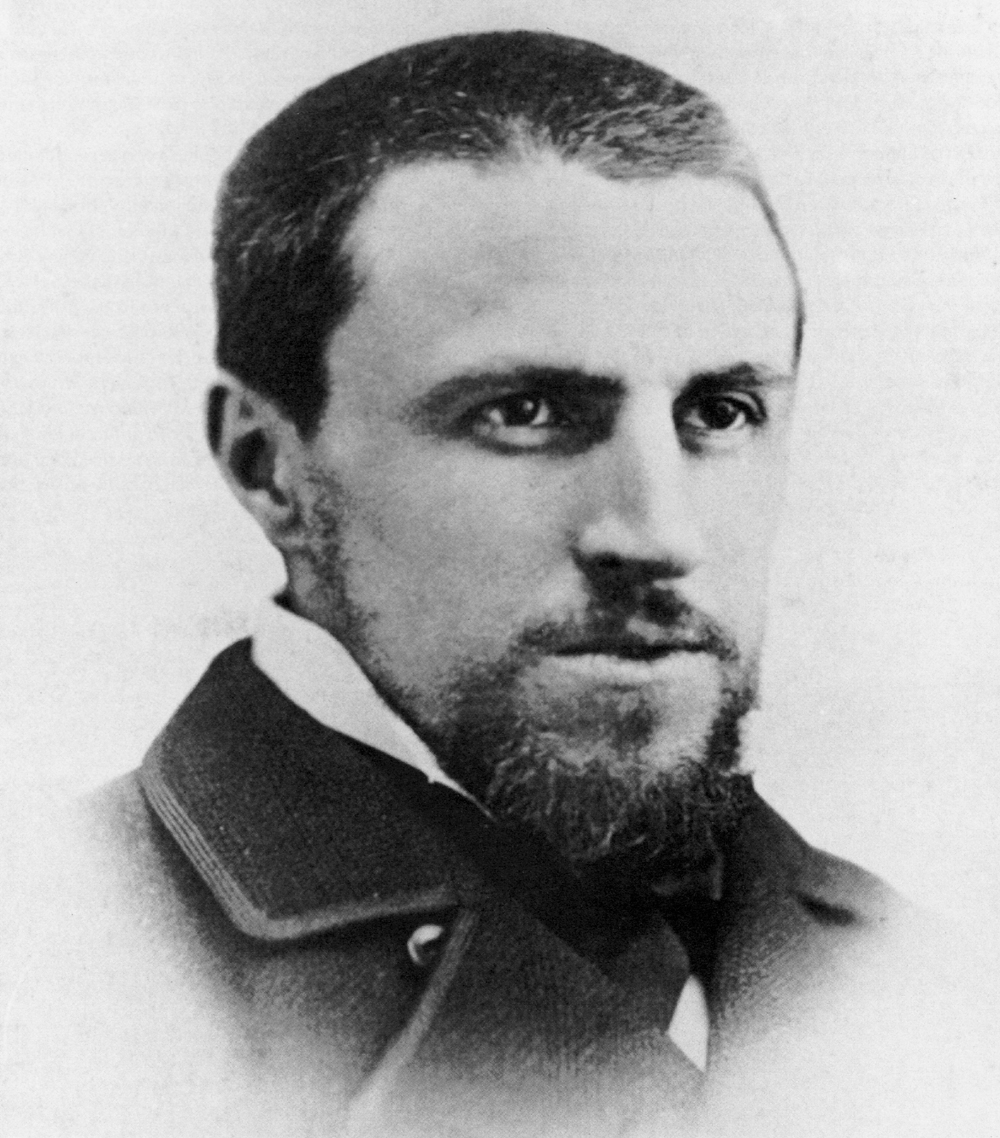
Gustave Caillebotte in 1878

The Caillebotte family wealth enabled Gustave to serve as a wealthy benefactor to his artist friends and paint freely without worrying about the need to sell his works. Therefore, Boating Party remained in the artist's collection until his death. It was one of 175 bequeathed to his brother, Martial Caillebotte, in 1894. It was passed to Martial's daughter in 1910 who survived until 1986 and remained in a private collection until 2022. In 2022, a Caillebotte work with seemingly identical provenance, Les Soleils, jardin du Petit Gennevilliers, was donated by a great-grandson of Martial to Musée d'Orsay.

During the 2010s, the top end of the market for Caillebotte did not move much (adjusted for inflation). In 2011, a record for his work was established at $18 million ($25.8 million in 2025). The 2019 sale of Rising Road (French: Chemin montant, 1881) pushed the record for the highest price achieved for a Caillebotte work to $22 million ($27.7 million in 2025) or €19.9 (€23.4 million in 2023). Suddenly, the market for his work was booming by 2020. In 2021, Young Man at His Window (French: Jeune homme à sa fenêtre, a National Treasure of France) was sold by the estate of Edwin L. Cox at auction at Christie's New York to the collection of the J. Paul Getty Museum in Los Angeles for $53 million ($63 million in 2025) or €48.9 million (€55.9 million in 2023), marking the Getty's first Caillebotte work. At the time of the Boating Party auction, France was not able to post a competitive bid for the work.

In January 2020, Boating Party was declared a national treasure, enabling the auction seller to exercise a 90% tax reduction if they accepted a competing National Treasure-based bid to keep the object in France. Once authorities confer national treasure status on an object, they have 30 months (during which the object may not leave France) to raise the funds for its purchase. At the time of its acquisition, Boating Party was described as "one of the last impressionist masterpieces still in private hands". Boating Party had been retained by Caillebotte's descendants until a donation by LVMH made it possible for the Musée d'Orsay to acquire it for $47 million ($51.7 million in 2025) or €43 million (€45.3 million in 2023) in 2022. Musée d'Orsay has the largest collection of Impressionist paintings in the world, but its 13 previous works by Caillebotte did not include any paintings from this part of his career where he worked on water-related themes. Boating Party was described as the most important treasure acquired by the state in the history of the National Treasure program. It was unveiled at the Musée d'Orsay on 30 January 2023, by Rima Abdul-Malak, French Minister of Culture.

The French Ministry of Culture organized a national celebration in conjunction with the 150th anniversary of Impressionism and the 130th anniversary of Caillebotte's death in 2024. The celebration began with a special display of the Boating Party at the Musée d'Orsay in 2023. The painting then toured France, being presented by Abdul-Malak at the Museum of Fine Arts of Lyon (9 September to 11 December), the Musée des beaux-arts de Marseille (15 December to 17 March) and the Fine Arts Museum of Nantes (23 March to 23 June). The Nantes exhibition coincided with both the Musée d'Orsay's 150th-anniversary Impressionism exhibition and its simultaneous celebration of loaning 180 works to 30 different museums throughout France. This was the first time that a National Treasure had been put on a national tour of French museums.

In 1994, 100 years after his death, Caillebotte's first comprehensive international retrospective exhibition took place, with Boating Party being included at both Galeries nationales du Grand Palais and Art Institute of Chicago. Renewed interest led to another exhibition for 2024–2025, including Boating Party, which was open from 8 October to 19 January at Musée d'Orsay, continued at the J. Paul Getty Museum from 25 February to 25 May, and concluded at the Art Institute of Chicago from 29 June to 5 October. The catalogue of this tour was named a Best Art Book of 2024 by The New York Times.

== See also ==
- List of paintings by Gustave Caillebotte
