= Michel Piquemal =

French choir conductor and conductor (born 1947)

- Born: 15 April 1947 (age 79); Paris, France
- Education: Maîtrise de Radio France
- Occupations: Baritone; Choir conductor; Conductor
- Organizations: Vittoria Choir
- Awards: Ordre des Arts et des Lettres; National Order of Merit; Legion of Honour

Michel Piquemal (born 15 April 1947) is a French choir conductor and conductor. He is also an operatic singer (baritone).

== Biography ==
Born in Paris, originally from Ariège, his parents were not musicians at all. Michel Piquemal wanted to play the piano and it was a teacher from the city of Paris, Françoise Deslogères, who spoke to his parents about it and, thanks to her, he began to study the piano. Then he entered the Boulogne Conservatory to do music theory with her as well. When it was necessary to go through 6th class, she was still the one who convinced his parents that he could enter the "Maîtrise de l'ORTF", the already very famous maîtrise. He applied and went in.

Michel Piquemal therefore began his singing studies at the "Maîtrise of the ORTF", which has now become the Maîtrise de Radio France. It is in this lineage that he continued his training with Pierre Bernac (baritone and favourite interpreter of Francis Poulenc), and Denise Duval (a fetish interpreter, qualified as a double-female by Francis Poulenc) for the French melody and finally, at the Mozarteum in Salzburg for the interpretation of the Lied.

In 1978, he founded the "Ensemble vocal Michel Piquemal" – a professional ensemble – with which he created works by François Vercken, Roger Calmel, Jacques Castérède, Kamilló Lendvay, Marcel Landowski, Jean Guillou and Jean-Louis Florentz.

In 1987, Michel Piquemal was entrusted with the direction of the Vittoria Choir and the Provence-Alpes-Côte d'Azur Regional Choir. Musical director of the Grand Choir of the abbey at Dames de Saintes, he is the director of the International Academy and choirs and orchestra of the Festival of the Sylvanes Abbey.

From 1985 to 1994, he taught at the Conservatoire de Paris.

His discography is rich and diversified. As a baritone, he has recorded works by Liszt, Sauguet, Lalo, Rossini, with the pianist Christine Lajarrige, mélodies by Poulenc. With his various formations, Piquemal made recordings dedicated to Rossini, Mendelssohn, Brahms, Schubert, Cornelius, Donizetti, Gabriel Fauré, Guy Ropartz, Poulenc, Lendvay, Duruflé, Arthur Honegger and Henri Tomasi.

Piquemal has been invited to conduct many national and international orchestras, such as those of Bordeaux, Cannes, Marseille, Nice, Avignon, Nancy, the Orchestre national de Lille, the Orchestre national d'Île-de-France, the Orchestre national des Pays de la Loire, the Orchestre de chambre de Paris, the Hungarian National Philharmonic, the Budapest Radio Orchestra and the Bucharest Orchestra, the Orchestre Philharmonique de Liège, the Orchestre symphonique de Bretagne, the Orchestre des Concerts Lamoureux, the Moroccan Philharmonic Orchestra etc.

At the head of his vocal ensemble, Michel Piquemal won in 1996 the third Victoires de la musique classique with the recording devoted to the integral of the sacred music by Maurice Duruflé, published at Naxos Records. A first Victoire de la musique classique followed by a second, this time with the Vittoria Choir, in 1998, for his recording of "David" by Arthur Honegger, released by Naxos again, and for all his achievements.

After having been Jacques Jouineau's assistant, Michel Piquemal taught singing at the Maîtrise de Radio France, then for nearly ten years at the Conservatoire de Paris until 1994 and at the 18th arrondissement of Paris's Conservatory until 2012. He has trained and accompanied among others: Nora Gubish, Hélène Le Corre, Sophie Marin-Degor, Béatrice Uria-Monzon, Clémentine Margaine and Norah Amsellem.

Piquemal has always sought to discover or rediscover works from the repertoire of forgotten classical music such as the music of Martial Caillebotte, brother of the impressionist painter Gustave Caillebotte, which he himself recorded in the form of two albums, including the Messe solennelle de Pâques, widely acclaimed by critics and for his work as a musician. Indeed, the latter received several awards, among others, the 4 F of Télérama and the 4 # of the Diapason magazine, under the label of the Éditions Hortus. His last Opus is the MisaTango called "Messe à Buenos Aires" by Martin Palmeri.

In parallel to his activities with his choirs and vocal ensemble, Michel Piquemal conducts singing courses, masterclasses or festivals, in order to continue to transmit to an amateur or professional audience, his knowledge of the Direction and Choral Chant, such as the Academy internship at the Music Festival of the Sylvanes Abbey.

Michel Piquemal was made an Officier of the Ordre national du Mérite, Officier des Arts et des Lettres, and Chevalier de la Légion d’Honneur for all of his musical contributions to heritage. He also has received the Hungarian award Pro Artibus.

== Choir conductor ==
- 1987: is entrusted with the management of the Vittoria Choir
- 1989: is entrusted with the management of the Chœur Régional Provence Alpes Côte d'Azur
- 1994: is entrusted with the management of the Choir of Sainte-Marie-des-Dames

== Discography ==
Discs with the Vittoria Choir.

- 2017: MisaTango by Martin Palmeri
- 2015: Une Journée by Martial Caillebotte
- 2012: Messe solennelle de Pâques by Martial Caillebotte
- 2008: Le Dernier Jour d'un condamné by David Alagna
- 2004: Missa Solemior, Reges Tharsis, Adoro Te, Sonate à deux, Chant de Pâques, Cortège by Gaston Litaize
- 2003: Polyphème by Jean Cras
- 1998: Djamileh by Georges Bizet
- 1997: David by Arthur Honegger
- 1996: L'Enfance du Christ by Hector Berlioz
- 1996: Françoise Pollet Airs sacrés français
- 1994: Requiem et Lazare by Alfred Bruneau
- 1994: Psaume 136, Les Vêpres sonnent, Dimanche, Nocturne, Le Miracle de Saint-Nilas by Joseph-Guy Ropartz
- 1992: Stabat Mater, Gloria et Litanies à la vierge noire by Francis Poulenc
- 1991: Stabat Mater, Via Crucis et Fantaisie et Fugue by Kamillo Lendvay
- 1991 : Requiem, Psaume 129 et Messe brève en l’honneur de Sainte Anne by Joseph-Guy Ropartz
- 1990: Le Déluge, La Nuit, La Fille du Timbalier by Camille Saint-Saëns
- 1990: Jessye Norman at Notre Dame
- 1989: Requiem, Psaume XVIII by Camille Saint-Saëns
- 1989: Dernière messe des vivants by François-Xavier Gossec

Discs as Baritone.

- Banalités, FP 107, by Francis Poulenc, Michel Piquemal (baritone) and Christine Lajarrige (piano), Naxos.
- 1988: Garden Concerto, Sonate d’église, L'oiseau a vu tout cela, Michel Piquemal (baritone), Jacques Vandeville (oboe), Jean-Patrice Brosse (organ), Ensemble instrumental Jean-Walter Audoli, Jean-Walter Audoli (dir.) - Arion

Discs with the Michel Piquemal vocal ensemble.
- Johannes Brahms (1)
- Johannes Brahms (2)
- Claude Debussy
- Maurice Duruflé
- Jean-Louis Florentz
- Kamillo Lendvay
- Felix Mendelssohn
- Joseph-Guy Ropartz
- Gioacchino Rossini (1)
- Gioacchino Rossini (2)
- Franz Schubert

== Distinctions ==
- 1996: 3rd Victoire de la musique classique for the Naxos recording of Maurice Duruflé's integral sacred music with his vocal ensemble.
- 1998: 5th Victoire de la musique classique for the recording of the David by Arthur Honegger, with the Vittoria Choir of Île-de-France
- 2001: President of the jury of the Concours international de quintette à vent Henri Tomasi
- Officier of the National Order of Merit
- Officier of the Ordre des Arts et des Lettres
- Chevalier of the Legion of Honour
- Hungarn Prize Pro Artibus.

== Documentaries ==
- Report on Antenne 2, 8 August 1980, at Vaison-la-Romaine, on the rehearsals of the requiem by Roger Calmel.
- Le Requiem perdu de Henri Tomasi, by Jacques Sapiéga (2001), documentary on the recording of the Requiem pour la Paix by Michel Piquemal, with the Orchestre philharmonique de Marseille, the Chœur Régional PACA and the Chœur départemental des Alpes maritimes.
- The Messe solennelle de Pâques, by Martial Caillebotte (2013), documentary on the recording of the Mass, with the Pasdeloup Orchestra and the Vittoria Choir.
- The Misa Tango by Martín Palmeri (2016), documentary on the recording of the Misa Tango by Michel Piquemal with the Pasdeloup Orchestra, and the Vittoria Choir.
