= Caillebotte =

Caillebotte is a French surname. Notable people with the surname include:

- Gustave Caillebotte (1848–1894), French painter
- Martial Caillebotte (1853–1910), French photographer and composer, brother of Gustave
