= The Soul Breaking the Links Holding it to the Earth =

Painting by Pierre-Paul Prud'hon

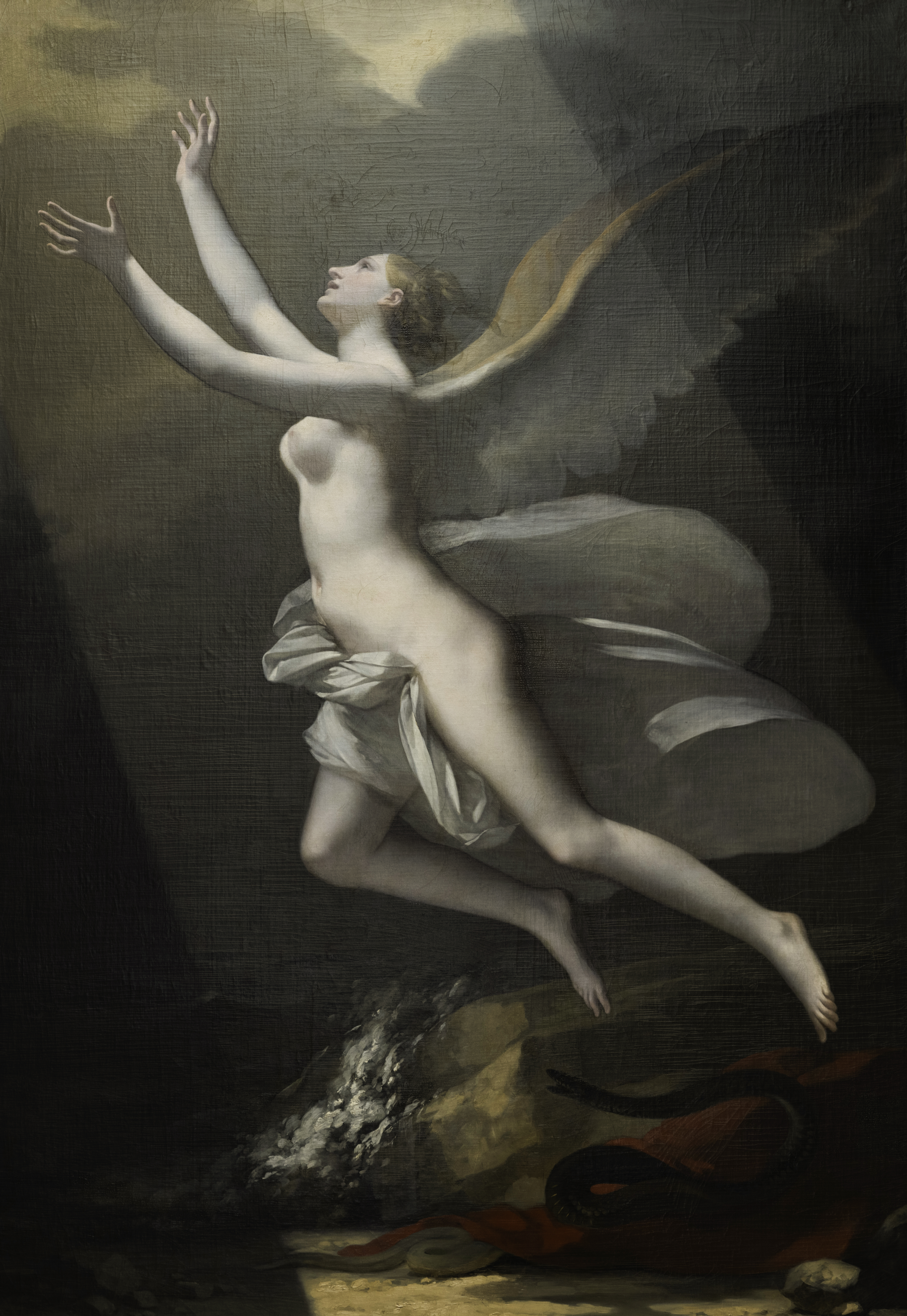
- Artist: Pierre-Paul Prud'hon
- Year: 1821-1823
- Medium: Oil on canvas
- Location: Louvre, Paris

The Soul Breaking the Links Holding it to the Earth is an oil on canvas allegorical painting by Pierre-Paul Prud'hon, begun in 1821 and left incomplete upon his death in 1823. It is held in the Louvre, in Paris.

It shows the soul of a dying person in the form of a female angel launching itself from the earth (on which lies a twisted snake) and flying towards heaven and a ray of divine light. It was declared a national treasure of France on 19 May 2018 and given to the Louvre in November 2019 by the Société des amis du Louvre.
