= Art Institute of Chicago II, Chicago =

Photograph by Thomas Struth

Art Institute of Chicago II, Chicago is a color photograph taken by German photographer Thomas Struth, in 1990. It is part of the series Museum Photographs, depicting several museums and monuments all over the world, and their visitors. In this case it was the second that he took in the Art Institute of Chicago.

== History and description ==
Struth spent several hours or days in each museum that he visited until finally deciding which work he wanted to capture in camera. In this case he took aim at the 1877 painting by French artist Gustave Caillebotte, Paris Street; Rainy Day, in the room where it was exhibited in the Art Institute of Chicago. The painting takes the central stage in the photograph, while on his background and in a different wall, two smaller paintings are hanging at each side. The painting itself depicts several people, with their umbrellas, including a couple, in the foreground, walking through a street of Paris in a rainy day. Two women, seen from their backs, are facing the painting. One, at the left, wearing a pleated dress, appears with a stroller, while other, apparently of younger age, with long hair and holding her hands behind her back, seems to be looking at a closer level at the painting or perhaps is reading the label. To their left, in the background, a man pays attention to the paintings, while at the opposite side, four visitors have the same interest.

The space of the painting seems to connect with the one surrounding it, to the point, as the Art Institute of Chicago website, states "The women’s clothing harmonizes remarkably with the palette of the painting, and the gallery’s marble floor seems transformed into a continuation of the wet cobblestones rendered so believably by Caillebotte's paintbrush." In a similar way, art historian Hans Belting observes "One no longer knows what is inside the painting and what is in front of it... We feel like rubbing our eyes when the space in front of the painting transforms itself into a picture that is not separated from the painting."

== Art market ==
A print of this photograph sold for £635,000 (then approximately US$777.088) at Phillips, in London, on 3 November 2016. This made it one of the highest prices reached in auction in the art market that year.

== Public collections ==
There are prints of this photograph at the Hamburger Kunsthalle, the Astrup Fearnley Museum of Modern Art, in Oslo, and at the Art Institute of Chicago.
