= National treasure of France =

Goods of cultural significance in France

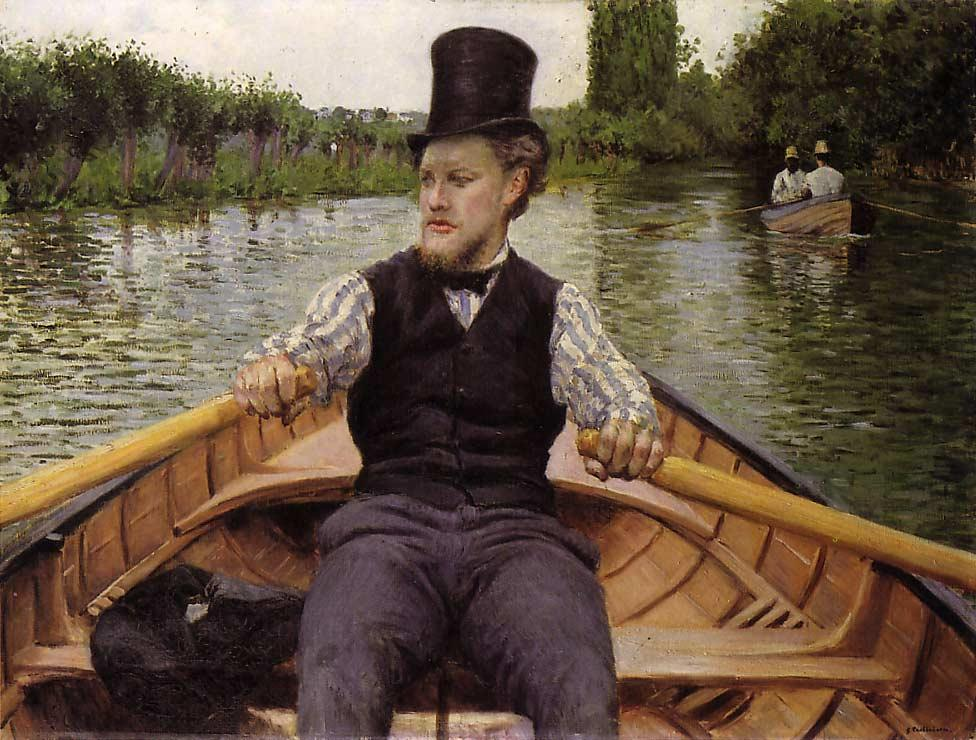
When Boating Party was declared a National Treasure in 2020, LVMH made a €43 million (€45.3 million in 2023) donation so that France could purchase it in 2022.

A national treasure of France is a cultural good of major importance to the heritage of France from the point of view of art, history, or archaeology. It is officially designated as such when a particular object has had an export certificate refused, which temporarily prevents its exit from the territory of France. Once authorities confer national treasure status on an object, they have 30 months (during which the object may not leave France) to raise the funds for its purchase. If France acquires a declared treasure, this entitles its seller to exercise a 90% tax reduction. Of the 266 items declared a national treasure in the first 30 years of the program, nearly 75% had been successfully acquired for France.

== Recent historical examples ==
Gustave Caillebotte's 1877–78 painting, Boating Party, was described as the most important national treasure acquired by the French Republic in the history of the National Treasure program. Boating Party had been owned by Caillebotte's descendants until a donation by LVMH made it possible for the Musée d'Orsay to acquire the declared national treasure for $47million ($51.7 million in 2025) or €43 million (€45.3 million in 2023) in 2022. In 2021, Caillebotte's Young Man at His Window (also a National Treasure of France) was sold by the estate of Edwin L. Cox at auction at Christie's New York to the collection of the J. Paul Getty Museum in Los Angeles for $53 million ($63 million in 2025) or €48.9 million (€55.9 million in 2023), marking the Getty's first Caillebotte work.

If a declared item is being listed at auction in France, the auction for that item can be shut down as it was in 2017 when the original version of Marquis de Sade's 1785 novel The 120 Days of Sodom, which was appraised at €6 million (€7.3 million in 2023) or £5.3 million (£7.1 million in 2025), and André Breton's Surrealist Manifesto, which was appraised at €4million (€4.8 million in 2023), were listed at an Aguttes auction house in Paris.

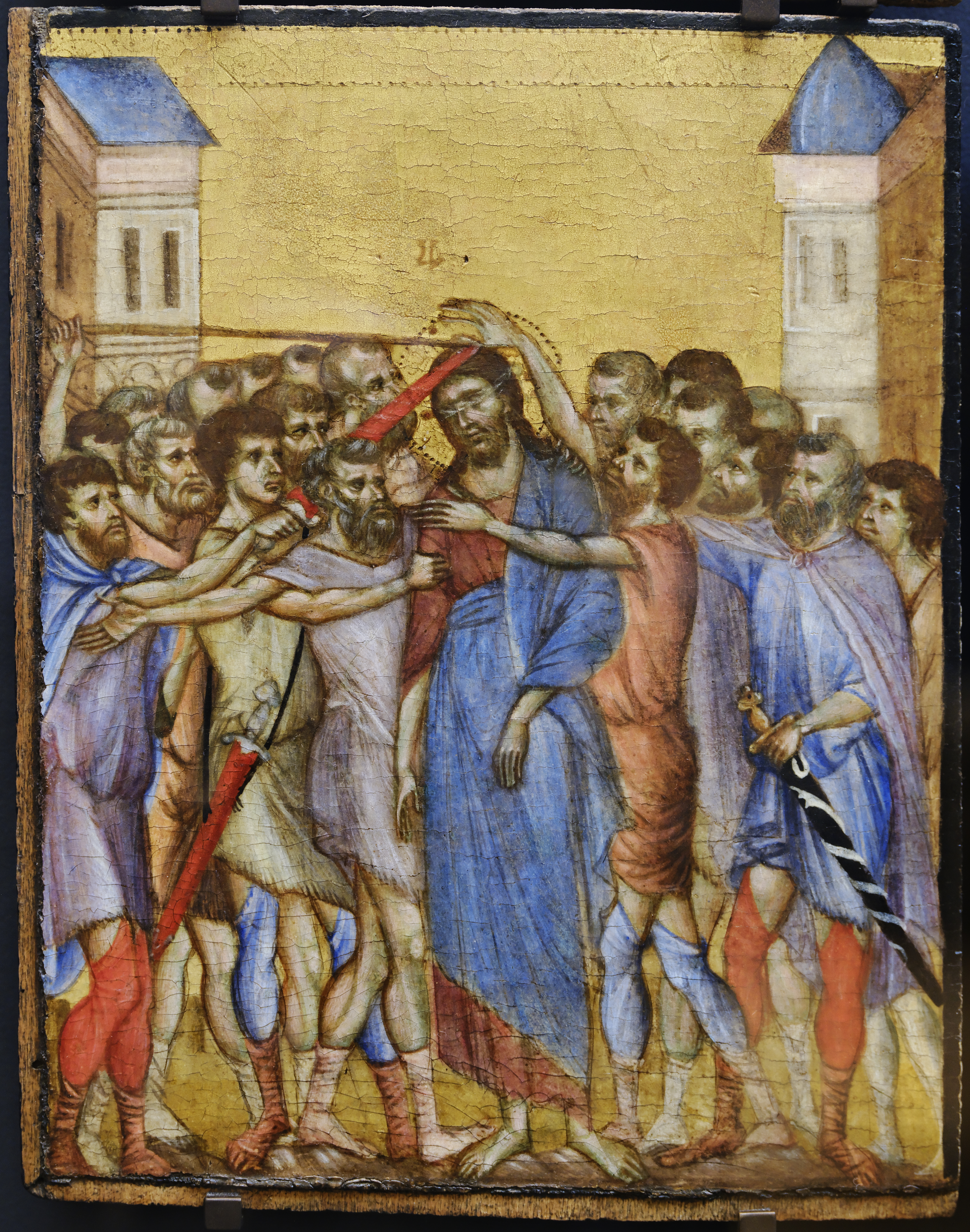
The export of The Mocking of Christ was denied via the National Treasure process. It is now at the Louvre.

If the auction has been completed, an object can be declared a national treasure to halt export and allow 30 months to attempt to raise funds as was the case with The Mocking of Christ, which had been won at auction in 2019 for €24.2 million (€28.4 million in 2023) or $26.8 million ($33.7 million in 2025). In 2023, this work landed in the Louvre.

National treasures remain at risk of unsavory and illegal activity. In November 2024, a national treasure work of 138 figures showing the Life of Christ, encrusted with diamonds and rubies set in marble, known as Via Vitae, was stolen from the Hiéron Museum in Paris. Its estimated value at the time was €7m (£5.8m).

== Criteria ==
National treasures of France are defined in article L.111-1 of the French heritage code:

- Goods belonging to the collections of museums in France
- Public archives as well as goods classified as historical archives
- Properties classified as historical monuments
- Other goods forming part of the movable public domain (art. L. 2112-1 of the general code of the property of public persons)
- Other properties of major interest for the national heritage from the point of view of history, art, or archaeology
