= Jean-Louis Florentz =

French composer (1947–2004)

- Born: 19 December 1947; Asnières-sur-Seine, France
- Died: 4 July 2004 (aged 56); Paris
- Education: Conservatoire de Paris
- Occupations: Composer; Music educator
- Organizations: Orchestre philharmonique de Radio France
- Awards: Chevalier of the Ordre des Arts et des Lettres

Jean-Louis Florentz (19 December 1947 – 4 July 2004) was a French composer.

== Biography ==
Born in Asnières-sur-Seine, Florentz was a student of Pierre Schaeffer and Olivier Messiaen. In 1978, he won the Lili Boulanger composition prize, followed by various prizes from the SACEM and the Institut de France. His unceasing travels in Africa allowed him to study ethnomusicology and linguistics. He was a friend of Olivier Latry, organist of Notre-Dame.

He was a composer-in-residence at the Villa Médicis in Rome (1980–1981) and at the Casa de Velázquez in Madrid (1983–1985)

He died from cancer in 2004 in Paris.

He had been a member of the Académie des Beaux-Arts since 1995.

== Works ==
- Ti'ndé (Op. 1, 1975–1976), for viola and small orchestra
  Commission from the Ministry of Culture
- Ténéré - Incantation sur un verset coranique (Op. 2, 1977–1978), for orchestra
  Commission from the Ministry of Culture
- Magnificat - Antiphone for the Visitation (Op. 3, 1979–1980), for tenor, mixed choir and orchestra
  Commission from the Festival d’arts sacrés de la Ville de Paris.
- Les Marches du Soleil (Op. 4, 1981–1983), for orchestra. Commission from Radio France
- Laudes - Kidân za-nageh (op. 5, 1983–1985), 7 pieces for organ. Duration 32'. Commission from "Ars organorum"
  1. Dis-moi ton nom…
  2. Prière pour délier les charmes
  3. Harpe de Marie
  4. Chant des fleurs
  5. Pleurs de la Vierge
  6. Rempart de la croix
  7. …Seigneur des lumières
- Chant de Nyandarua (Op. 6, 1985), for 4 cellos. Duration 15' - Commission from Radio France
- Asun, Conte symphonique sur l’Assomption de Marie (Op. 7, 1986–1988), for soprano, tenor, baritone, mixed choir, children's choir and orchestra. Duration 50'. Commission from Radio France. 7 scenes
  1. L’Aube sur le lac Tana, en Éthiopie
  2. L’Ange à la Palme
  3. La Forêt des Arcanes
  4. L’Autel de l’Eau (Prière de Marie au Golgotha)
  5. L’Arche de Miséricorde
  6. Colonnes de Soleil
  7. Porte de la Lumière
- Debout sur le Soleil (Op. 8, 1990), resurrection song for organ. Duration 25'
  Commission from Radio France
- Asmarâ (Op. 9, 1991–1992), for mixed choir a cappella. Duration 17'
  Commission from the Conseil général de Savoie et du Ministère de la Culture
- Le Songe de Lluc Alcari (Op. 10, 1992–1994), for cello and orchestra. Duration 32'
  Commission from "Musique nouvelle en liberté" and the Ministère de la Culture for the Orchestre de Paris
- Second Chant de Nyandarua, Litanies for 12 cellos. Duration 13'
- L’Ange du Tamaris, for solo cello, duration, about 11/30'
- Les Jardins d’Amenta, conte symphonique pour grand orchestre, Duration 32'
  Commission from the Orchestre national de Lyon
- L’Anneau de Salomon (Opus 14A, 1997/1998 – 1 April 1999), symphonic dance for solo orchestra. Duration 25'
  Commission from the Orchestre national de Lyon
- La Croix du Sud (Op. 15, 1999–2000), symphonic poem for organ. Duration 17'
  Commission from the "Association Renaissance des grandes orgues de la Basilique Saint-Rémi de Reims"
- L’Enfant des îles (Pp. 16, 2001 – 10 March 2002), symphonic poem for large orchestra. Duration 33'
  Commission from the Orchestre national des Pays de la Loire
- L’Enfant noir, symphonic tale for pipe organ in 14 scenes, 1st scene: Prélude (2002), duration 9'
  Commission from the Concours internationaux de la Ville de Paris and "Musique nouvelle en liberté".
- Qsar Ghilâne ou le Palais des Djinns (Op. 18, 2003), symphonic poem for orchestra. Duration 22'
  Commission from the Orchestre de chambre de Paris and the French Ministry of Culture

== Tributes ==
The Grand Prix d’orgue of the École régionale des beaux-arts d'Angers which has been awarded annually since 2002 to the best young hope among the organists, has been renamed Grand Prix Florentz or Grand prix d'orgue Jean-Louis Florentz.

He had been a member of the Académie des Beaux-Arts since 1995. Michaël Levinas succeeded him in 2009 and pronounced his praise under the Coupole on 15 June 2011

== Discography ==
- Magnificat – Antiphone pour la Visitation / Les Laudes, I. Caley by Michel Bourcier (organ), vocal ensemble Michel Piquemal, Ensemble orchestral de Paris, Armin Jordan (dir.) – Erato/MFA 2292-45432-2.
- Debout sur le Soleil / Les Laudes by Michel Bourcier (organ) – Koch/Schwann 3-6407-2H1.
- Les Jardins d’Amènta / Le Songe de Lluc Alcari / L’Ange du Tamaris by Yvan Chiffoleau, Yves Potrel (cellos), Orchestre national de Lyon, Emmanuel Krivine, Günther Herbig (dir.) – MFA/Radio France – MFA 216023
- L’Enfant des îles / L’Anneau de Salomon by the Orchestre national des Pays de la Loire, Hubert Soudant (dir.)Hubert Soudant – Forlane 16832
- Intégrale de l'œuvre pour orgue by Michel Bourcier, Olivier Latry and Béatrice Piertot, 2 Cdbooks Marie-Louise Langlais: Jean-Louis Florentz, l'œuvre d'orgue. témoignages croisés, Symétrie, Lyon, 2009.
- Asun, Requiem de la Vierge by Françoise Pollet, choir and orchestre de Radio-France, Claude Bardon (dir.), 1988 (live)

Separate pieces

- Chants de Nyandarua by P. Boufil, M. Bardon, F. Dariel, C. Tricoire (cellos) in 133 violoncelles pour Pablo Casals – Vogue VG 651-645007 (live)
- L’Ange du Tamaris by Dominique de Williencourt (cello) in Musique française pour violoncelle - Triton TRI 2021
- L’Ange du Tamaris by Arto Noras (cello) – Arion ARN 68414
- Asmarâ in French Choral Music by the Nederlands Kamerkoor, Ed Spanjaard (dir.) - Globe/Codaex GLO 5215

== Bibliography ==
- "Incidences de la bio-acoustique dans la composition musicale", Journal de Psychologie, n° 1-2, January–June 1983
- "La question du timbre et les vibratos harmoniques dans les Laudes, op. 5 pour orgue", L’Orgue n° 218, April–June 1991. Également disponible dans Contemporary Music Review, vol. 8, part 1, 1993
- "L’espace symphonique et la liturgie éthiopienne dans Debout sur le Soleil, op. 8, pour orgue", L’Orgue, n° 221, January–February–March 1992
- "Incidences et traditions musicales éthiopiennes dans Asmarâ, Op. 9", Intemporel, bulletin de la Société nationale de musique n° 26, April–June 1998
- "L’Église orthodoxe éthiopienne de Jérusalem. L’Assomption à Däbrä Gännät, Monastère du Paradis, Jérusalem-Ouest", Ocora/Radio-France C 560027/028 (2CD)

Interviews

- "Entretien avec Jean-Louis Florentz", Zodiaque n° 163, January 1990, atelier du Cœur-Meurtry, abbaye Sainte-Marie-de-la-Pierre-qui-vire
- Myriam Soumagnac, "with Jean-Louis Florentz", by Intemporel, "bulletin de la Société nationale de musique" n° 12, Oct.-Dec. 1994
- "Les hommes en vert, cinq questions à Jean-Louis Florentz", La Lettre de l’Académie des beaux-arts, No 15, summer 1998

Analysis

- Apollinaire Anakesa, Florentz... sur les marches du soleil, Lillebonne, Millénaire III, 1998. ISBN 2-911906-04-7
- Pascale Guitton-Lanquest, "Jean-Louis Florentz, Magnificat - Antiphone pour la Visitation - Rite, Nature, Nombre : La Femme, médiatrice du Sacré", Intemporel, bulletin de la Société nationale de musique n° 17, January–March 1996
- Marie-Louise Langlais, Jean-Louis Florentz, l’œuvre d’orgue témoignages croisés, Symétrie, Lyon, 2009 ISBN 978-2-914373-49-4
