= Place de Dublin =

Square in Paris, France

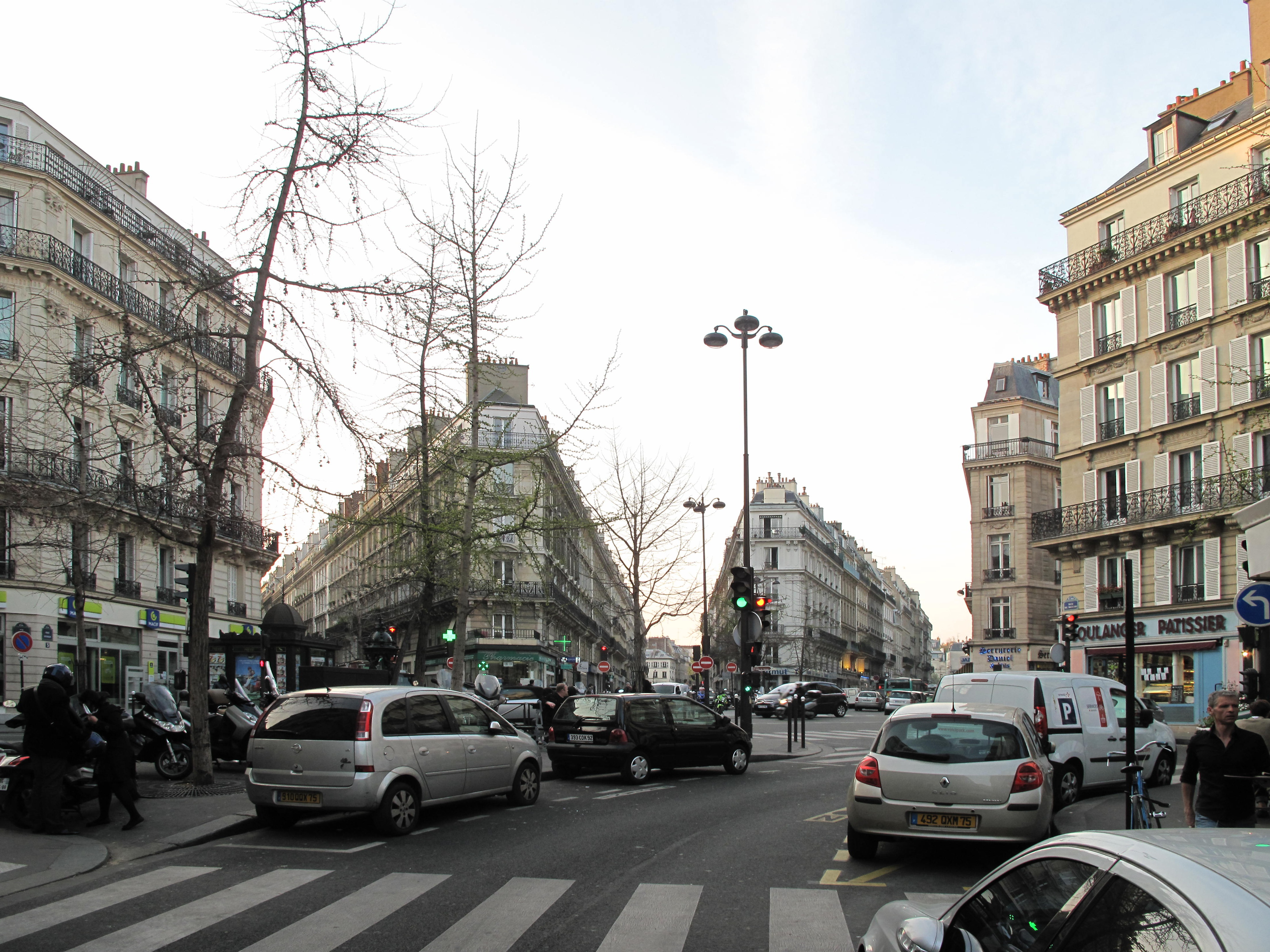
- The Place de Dublin viewed from the Rue de Moscou in 2011

- Location within Paris
- Arrondissement: 8th
- Coordinates: 48°52′51″N 2°19′29″E

The Place de Dublin is a square in the 8th arrondissement of Paris. It was named after Dublin, the capital of Ireland. The intersection is depicted in Gustave Caillebotte's painting Paris Street; Rainy Day (1877).

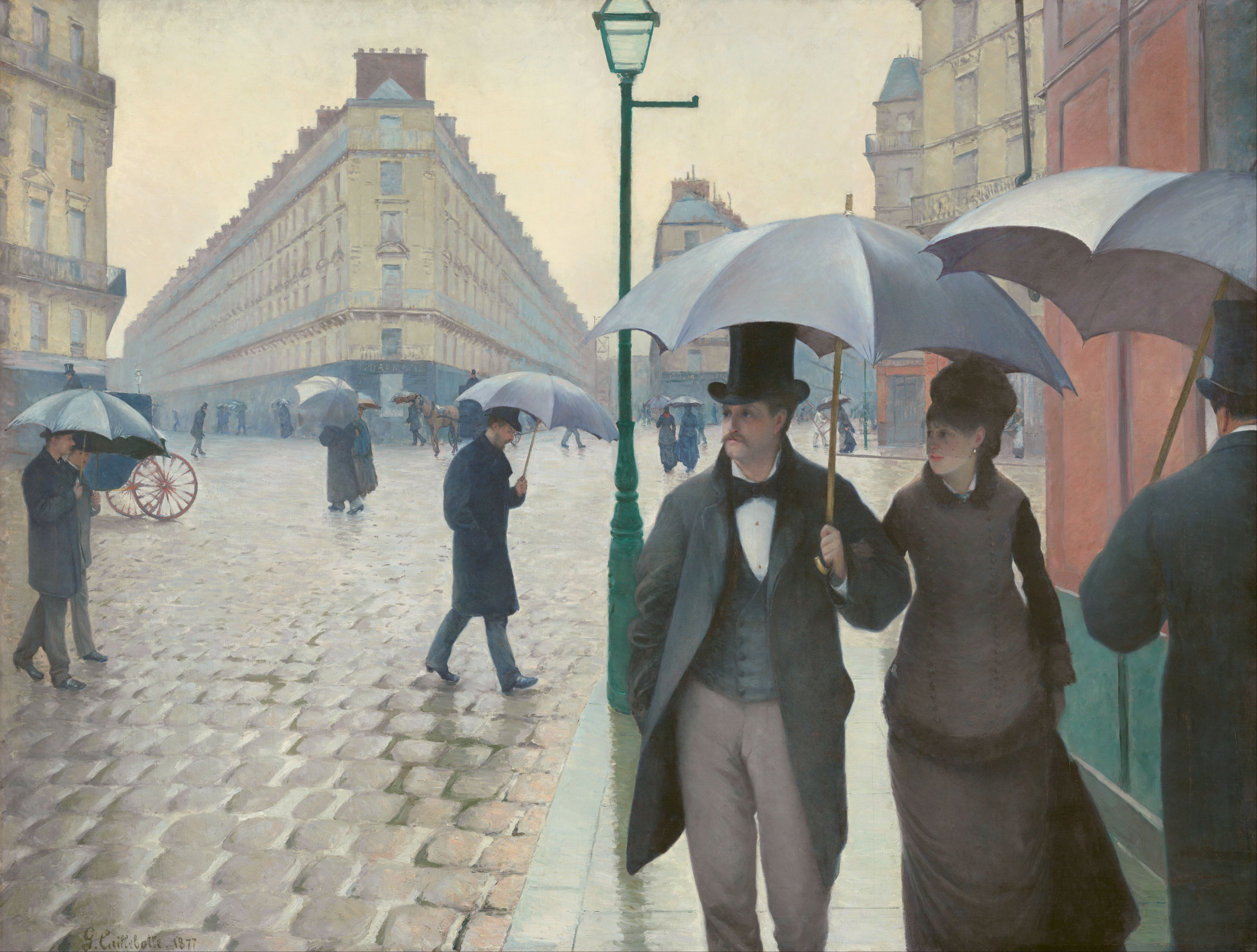
Place de Dublin depicted in Paris Street; Rainy Day (Gustave Caillebotte, 1877)

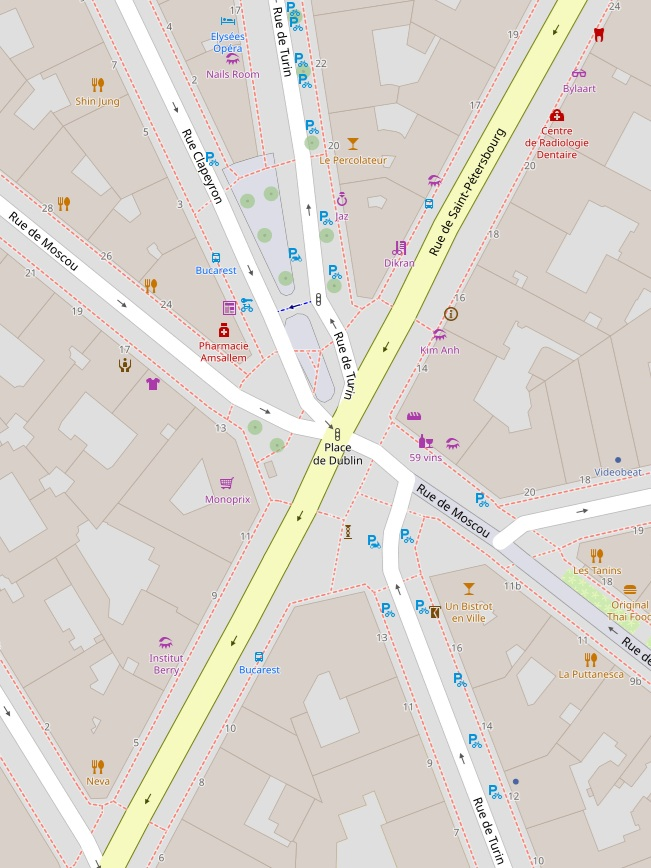
Intersection level detail, 2025
