= Paris Street; Rainy Day =

1877 painting by Gustave Caillebotte

- Rue de Paris, temps de pluie (French)
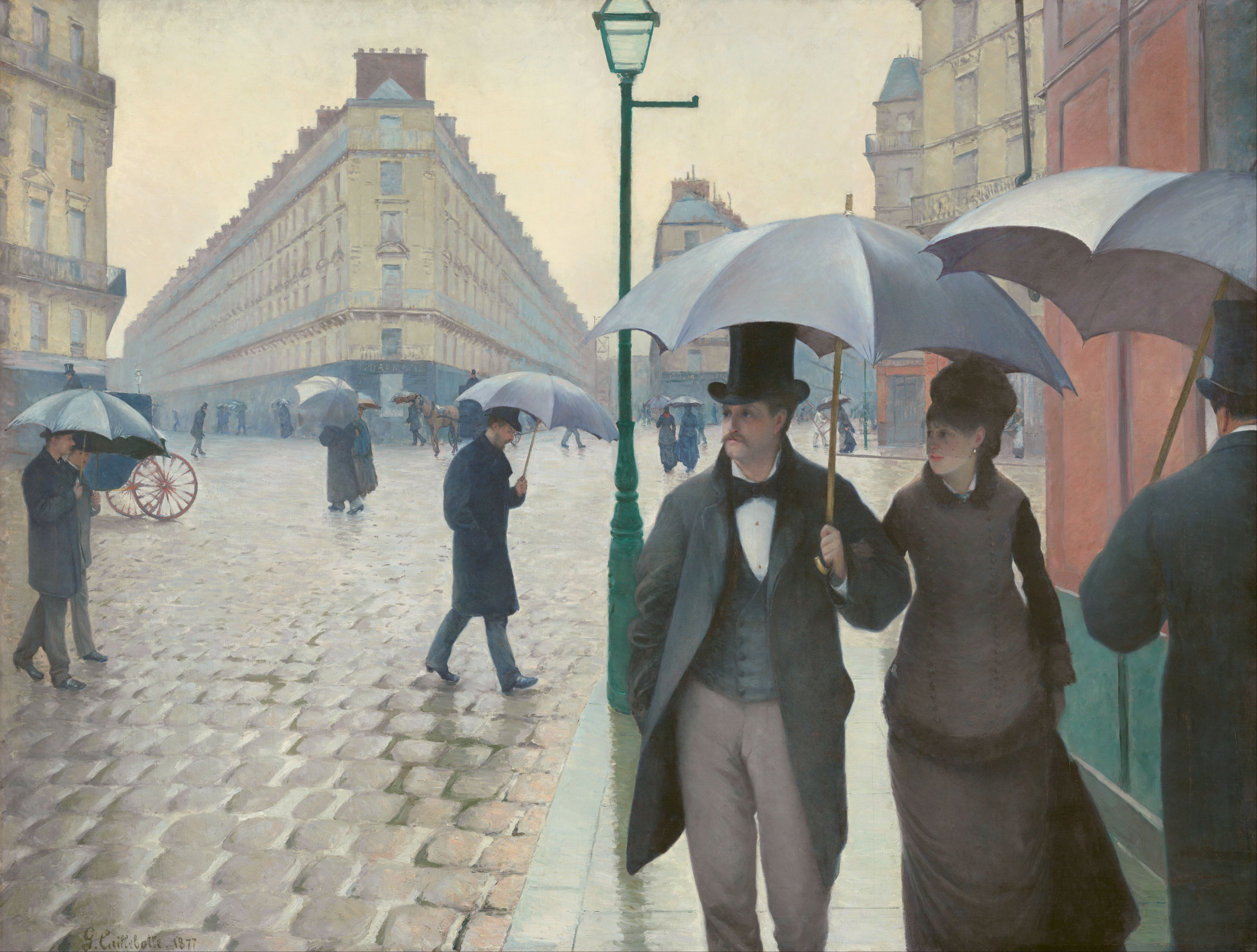
- Artist: Gustave Caillebotte
- Year: 1877
- Medium: Oil on canvas
- Dimensions: 212.2 cm × 276.2 cm (83.5 in × 108.7 in)
- Location: Art Institute of Chicago, Chicago
- Accession: 1964.336

Paris Street; Rainy Day (French: Rue de Paris, temps de pluie) is a large 1877 oil painting by the French artist Gustave Caillebotte, now at the Art Institute of Chicago in Chicago, Illinois. The work shows a Parisian street scene of pedestrians in rainy weather crossing a boulevard intersection in the present-day Place de Dublin, a square in the eighth arrondissement. It is the best known of Caillebotte's several cityscapes linked to Paris's reconstruction under Napoleon III and Georges-Eugène Haussmann in the mid-19th century. Paris Street exemplifies the artist's views on modernity.

Caillebotte made a number of preliminary sketches in graphite and oil. The composition shows 24 mostly bourgeois pedestrians, dominated by a foreground couple with an umbrella, who are staring outside of the viewer's field of vision. The painting takes the form of a photorealistic cityscape, departing from the typical style of Impressionist art, representative of a Paris that appears austere and hostile to human interaction. Caillebotte employed several visual techniques to create the illusion of three-dimensional space, such as linear two-point perspective and colour effects.

Paris Street was first shown in April 1877 at the Third Impressionist Exhibition in Paris, where it was widely praised for its photorealism and precision. It was not displayed publicly again until a posthumous retrospective exhibition in 1894. Caillebotte bequeathed the work to his youngest brother Martial, and it remained in obscurity, in the family's possession, before being sold to art collectors in the mid-20th century. The Art Institute of Chicago's acquisition in 1964 accelerated a revival of Caillebotte's art, increasing his reputation as an artist in the public eye.

== Background ==
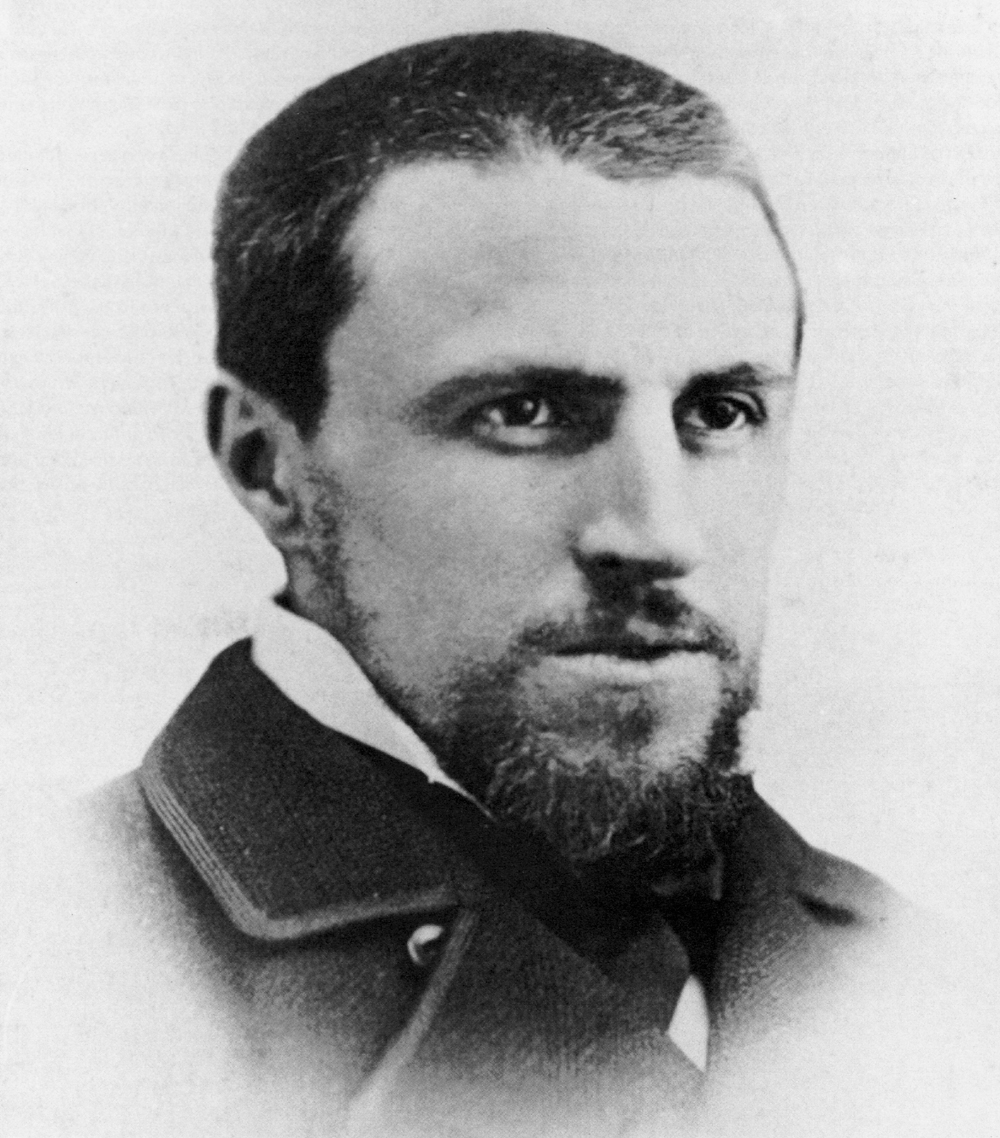
Gustave Caillebotte in 1878

Gustave Caillebotte was born in August 1848 in Paris, the eldest son of Céleste and Martial Calliebotte, a landowner and manager of a textile manufacturing enterprise for the French Armed Forces. Martial died in 1874, bequeathing Caillebotte a share of his estate. Caillebotte's inheritance increased substantially after the death of his mother in 1878, leaving him comfortably off.

Caillebotte probably first met with Impressionist artists before the First Impressionist Exhibition in 1874. He may have been courted to exhibit there but declined because he was committed to submit his Les raboteurs de parquet for the Salon of 1875, (Note: This is speculated from letters of correspondence between Caillebotte and the Italian artist Giuseppe De Nittis.) although the painting was rejected. In February 1876, Caillebotte received an invitation from Pierre-Auguste Renoir and Henri Rouart to participate in the Second Impressionist Exhibition that April; Les raboteurs de parquet and Young Man at His Window were two of the eight paintings he exhibited. Over time, he used money from his inheritance to help fund the annual Impressionist shows as an organizer, starting with the Third Impressionist Exhibition in January 1877.

In the 1850s, Napoleon III placed Georges-Eugène Haussmann, the prefect of the Seine department, in charge of overseeing the mass modernisation of Paris. Commonly referred to by the neologism "Haussmannisation", the project lasted several decades and saw the construction of parks, squares, housing, kiosks, and about 137 km (85 mi) of boulevards. There were also thorough infrastructural improvements to sewage, water management, and public transportation. One consequence was the displacement of thousands of mostly working class residents, including 75 percent of the population of the very central and historic Île de la Cité, to slums on the outskirts of Paris. The Caillebottes moved to a large, four-story mansion in Paris's eighth arrondissement amid the reconstruction, built on a parcel of land Martial purchased from the city on January 15, 1866. Much of Caillebotte's oeuvre is linked to this period of upheaval, featuring depictions of Paris emblematic of his views of modernity.

== Preparation ==
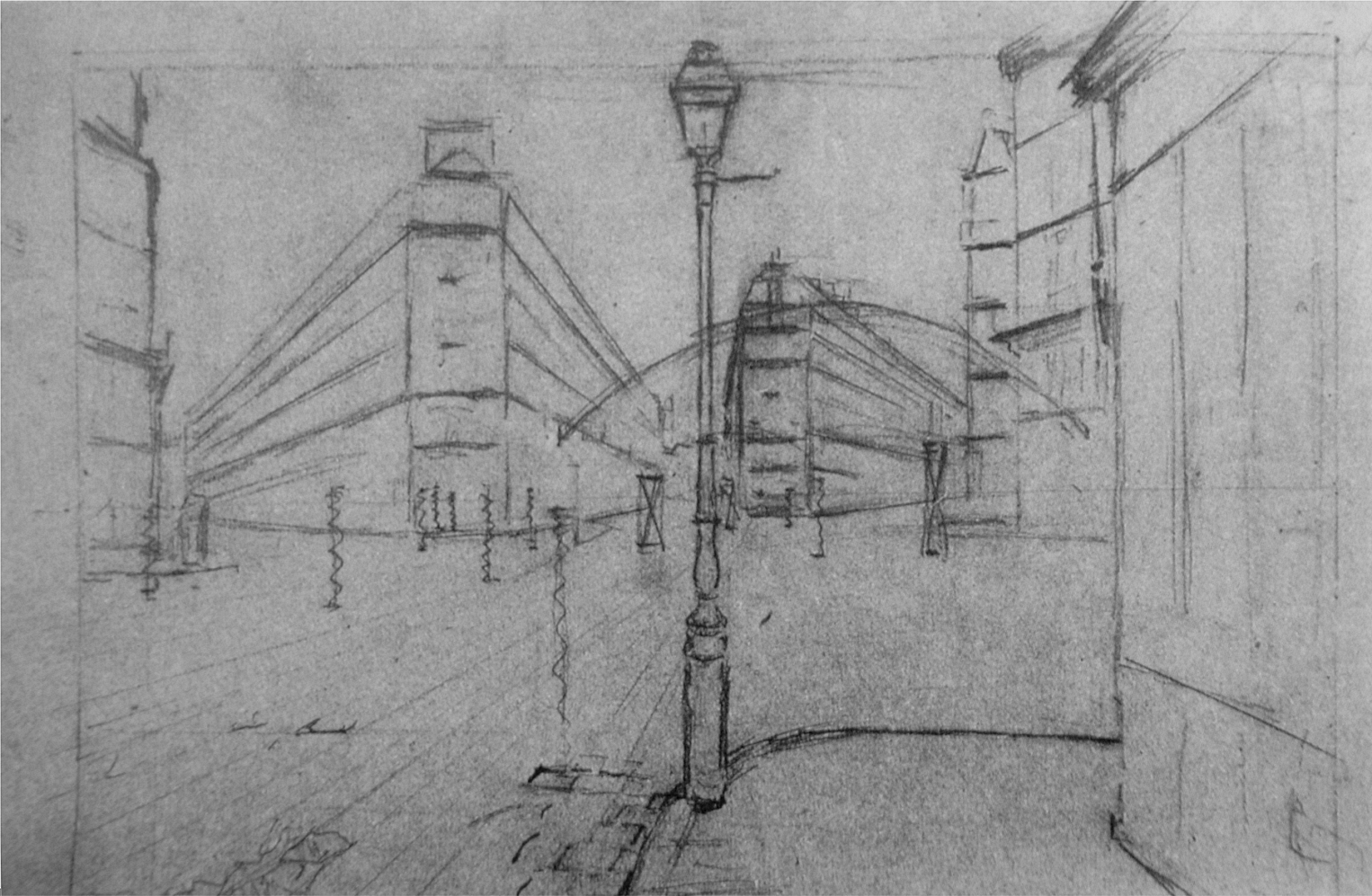
Study for Paris Street; Rainy Day, c. 1877

There are 23 surviving studies in graphite and oil paint. Caillebotte's concern in most of the sketches was with fleshing out the arrangement of the pedestrians, varying their poses and forms. The most elaborate, Study for Paris Street; Rainy Day (1877), focuses on the architecture, is in graphite on laid paper, and features a freehand sketch of the area and geometric line work reinforcing the painting's motifs and perspective. Background details are small and contrast with the drawing's broad field of vision, creating a wide angle effect, which implies the use of an optical device for assistance. Most scholars believe that Caillebotte traced his preparatory sketches from photos, or at least that he used photography in some way to produce the works, though a 2015 investigative report from the Art Institute of Chicago contests the assertion and concluded that Caillebotte likely made use of a camera lucida. The oldest pencil sketch, View from rue de Madrid toward rue de Lisbonne (1875), renders a different intersection in the city, though it is cited as a precursor to Paris Street.

The oil study measures 54 by 65 cm (21 by 26 in) and is in line with Caillebotte's later works, which are distinguished by a more usual Impressionist style. It develops the colour palette while modifying the perspective scheme and arrangement of objects in the compositional space. The dominant pigments are lead white, ochres and chrome yellows, umber, vermilion, cobalt blue and ultramarine, cobalt violet, and viridian.

== Description ==
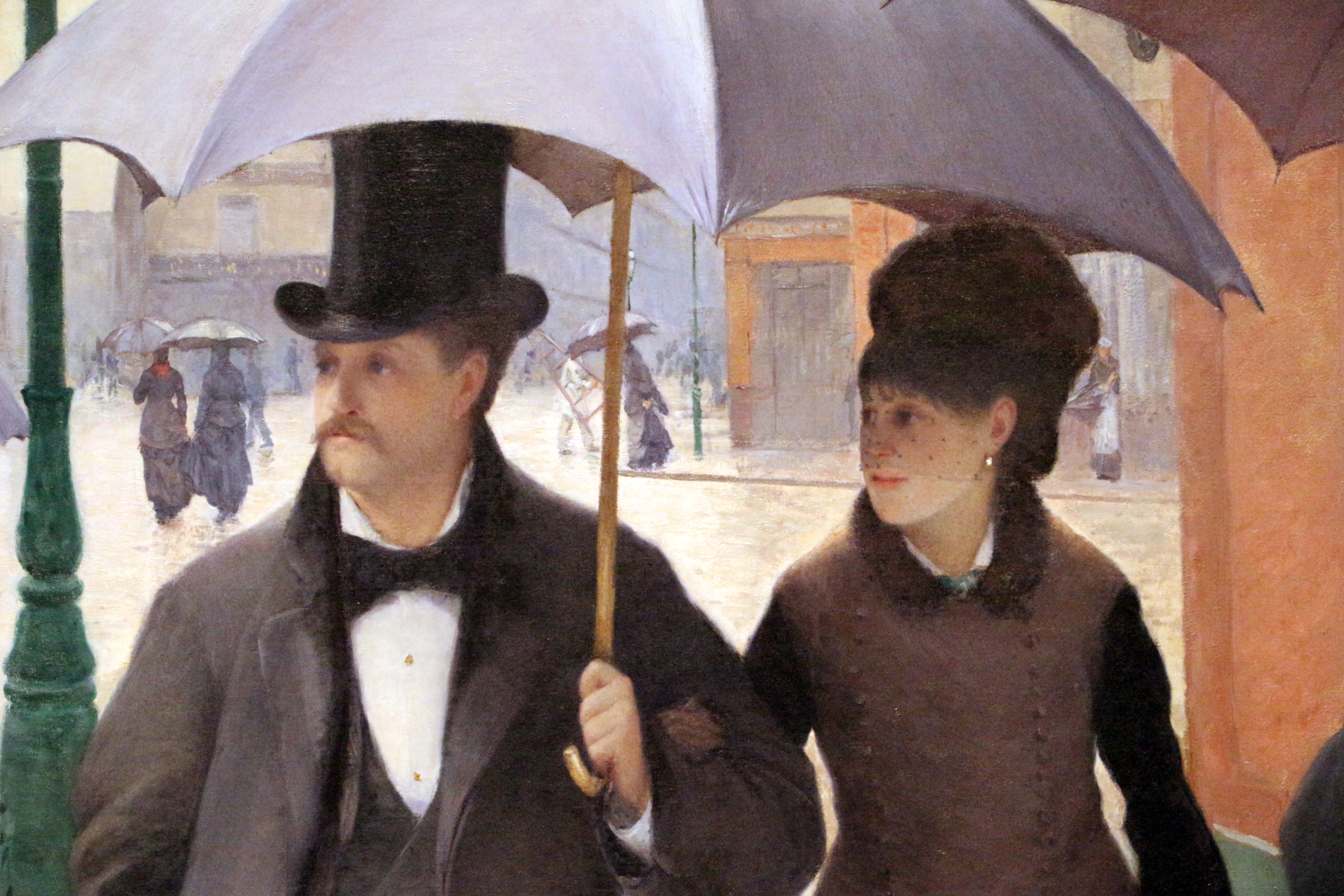
Detail of the foreground couple

Paris Street is an oil painting on canvas measuring 212.2 by 276.2 cm (83.5 by 108.7 in) in the collection of the Art Institute of Chicago in Chicago, Illinois. It is signed and dated in greyish-brown paint in the lower left: "G. Caillebotte. 1877". The work was restored in 1964 and again after the 2012–2013 show Impressionism, Fashion, and Modernity, its condition confirmed via X-ray, infrared, microscopic, and ultraviolet imaging. A technical examination of the piece found that Paris Street had been preserved under a layer of varnish applied in the early 1900s that steadily deteriorated, indicated by fingerprints, the fading of colours, and dark spots on the painted surface.

The painting depicts pedestrians in the rain traversing the intersection of the Rue de Turin, Rue de Moscou, Rue Clapeyron, and the Rue de Saint-Pétersbourg in present-day Place de Dublin, a square near the site of Caillebotte's apartment in the eighth arrondissement of Paris. This square was at the periphery of Haussmannised neighbourhoods and the older Quartier de l'Europe that emerged from urbanisation efforts in the 1820s, though had been completely transformed by the 1870s. There are 24 individuals dispersed throughout in fashions suggestive of their bourgeois class and the winter. Men are dressed in dark trousers and buttoned overcoats concealing a white linen shirt, while women sport dark walking dresses with embellished drapery that they carry off the ground to avoid getting dirty. Umbrellas are steel-framed and likely made of stretched waterproof silk. The painting positions a minority of workers in the background: a maid, two cab drivers, and a house painter carrying a ladder.

In the foreground is a man carrying an umbrella and, with his companion, staring at something outside of the viewer's field of vision. They are relaxed in posture; according to the art historian Mary Morton, the two exemplify Haussmannian Paris by exuding an "impassivity, sense of propriety, and entitlement." The man is the archetypal flâneur, an idle stroller, whose open coat contrasts with the painting's presentation of the other males. Underneath he wears a white shirt, a black knotted cravat, a waistcoat and fitted grey trousers, his outfit completed with a top hat as an adornment. His companion is dressed in a brown wool two-piece gown equipped with two rows of buttons, black velvet sleeves, and fur trim at the hips, collar and cuffs. The woman's adornments include a fur toque, a veil and an earring. She and the man are the only figures that are in physical contact, though two men in the far left foreground and two women in the far distance share comparable proximity. The art historian Michael Marinnan compares Paris Street to Le Pont de l'Europe (1876) because of their portrayals of class relations and geographically adjacent settings. The Art Institute of Chicago's catalogue of Caillebotte's work designates the pieces as "ambitious, accessible, and readily understandable representations of upper-middle-class residents in the new neighborhoods around the Gare Saint-Lazare."

== Style ==
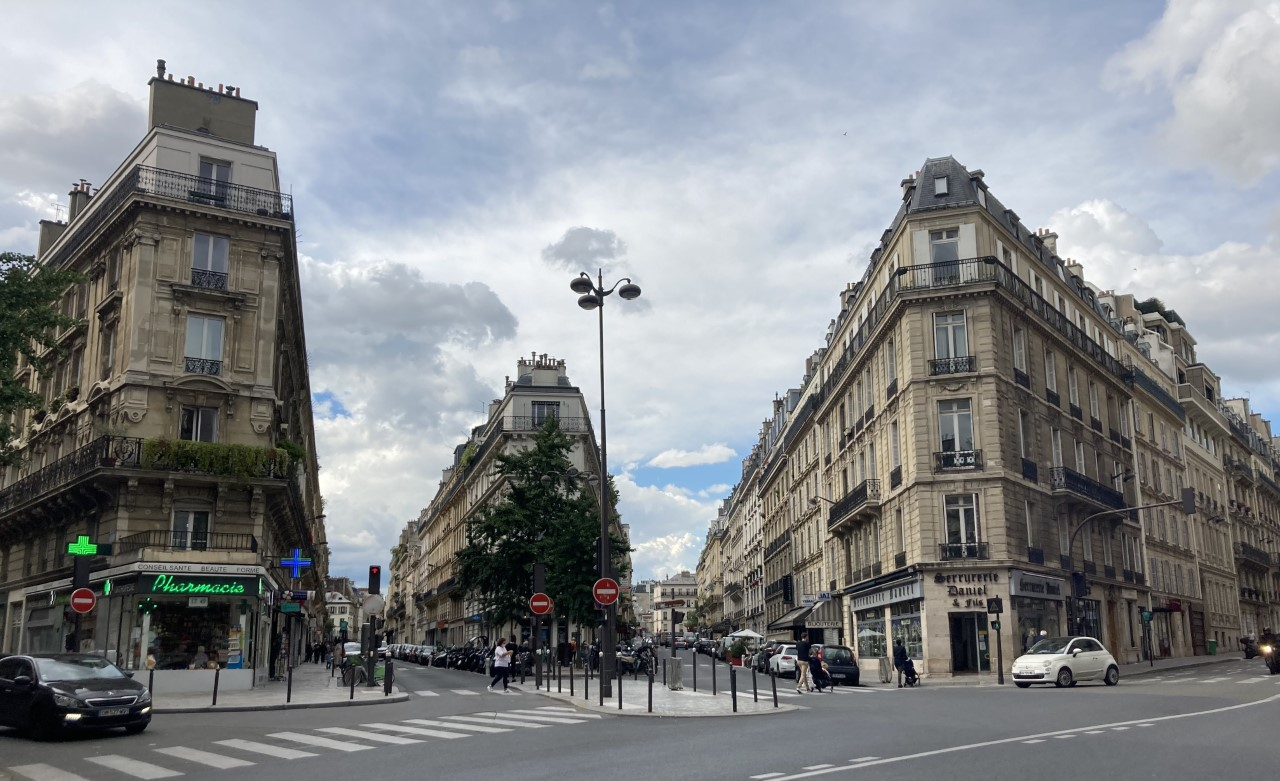
2021 photograph of the Place de Dublin

Caillebotte illustrates Paris Street with a photorealistic cityscape, departing from the typical style of Impressionist art. The piece was created with brush strokes of up to 1.5 cm (0.59 in), with substantial changes to the surface made by painting over or removing layers with a palette knife to start anew. Its colour palette comprises lead and zinc white, cobalt, ultramarine and cerulean blue, emerald green, viridian, Naples and cadmium yellow, and several iron-based pigments. Some have argued Paris Street more resembles academic art in scale, perspective, and composition. The art historian Kirk Varnedoe considered that Caillebotte's stylistic choices foreshadowed the techniques of the French Neo-Impressionist artists that emerged in the 1880s.

Paris Street reflects Caillebotte's preoccupation with life in post-Haussmannised Paris. His representation of the city is austere, one that appears hostile to human interaction, evoking the scale and uniformity of space frequently cited in critiques of Haussmannisation. The architectural backdrop is homogeneous and dominating, within a setting featuring no distinct topography. Pedestrians seem disengaged from each other and their surroundings, their expressions either out of view or lacking intricate detail; this isolation finds further expression in the umbrellas and rain. Visual cues, such as colour palette and the wet cobblestone pavement, evoke the weather rather than literal rainfall. Weather effects may pose a deeper symbolic function; some scholars have proposed that these aspects convey the restoration of Paris for the bourgeoisie from insurrection.

Caillebotte achieves the illusion of depth through linear two-point perspective, wherein the pictorial space converges at two vanishing points. Distance is further accentuated by strokes of grey and blue hues on the limestone building facades and Caillebotte's use of a repoussoir in the foreground couple. The green lamppost splits the canvas into halves, setting up a hierarchy of space up to the horizon. Given its compositional framework, historians have found similarities to Renaissance art, in particular the Flagellation of Christ (1459–1460) by the Italian painter and mathematician Piero della Francesca.

== Provenance ==
In the immediate aftermath of the death of his younger brother René in 1876, Caillebotte wrote a will stipulating the bequest of paintings in his personal collection, including works not by him, to the French state for display at the Musée du Luxembourg and then the Louvre. State officials were at first reluctant to accept the bequest; the Luxembourg did not have enough exhibition space for the collection, and the museum imposed a clause dictating no more than three or four works be shown at a time for each artist. This initiated protracted negotiations between Caillebotte's youngest brother Martial, an heir, and Renoir, the executor of the will, and the advisory committee of the Musées Nationaux after the artist's death in 1894. The parties reached an agreement in January 1895, which conferred works not selected by the state to the Caillebotte heirs. The state finalised the bequest on February 26, 1896, transferring ownership of 38 of the 67 paintings originally offered.

Paris Street remained in the possession of Martial and later Caillebottes, essentially unknown in a family residence. Walter P. Chrysler Jr., the son of industrialist Walter Chrysler, acquired the painting in 1954, but around 1964 sold it to the dealer and art collector Daniel Wildenstein through the gallery Wildenstein & Company. (Note: The date of Wildenstein's acquisition is contested. The exhibition catalogue Gustave Caillebotte: The Painter's Eye (2015) puts the year of purchase at 1960, while, according to the Art Institute of Chicago, the transaction took place in 1964.) In 1964, the Art Institute of Chicago purchased Paris Street from Wildenstein with funds allocated by its associate director John Maxon. It was known under several different names before the Art Institute of Chicago renamed the piece in 1991, based on the English translation of the French title advertised at the Third Impressionist Exhibition. (Note: These names include, but are not limited to, Rue de Paris, temps de Pluie: Le Carrefour formé par les rues de Turin, Petrograd, et Chapeyron (lit. 'Paris Street; Rainy Day: Intersection formed by the rue de Turin, Petrograd, and Chapeyron'), Paris, A Rainy Day—Intersection of the rue de Turin and the rue de Moscou, and Umbrellas in the Place de l’Europe on a Rainy Day.)

== Reception ==
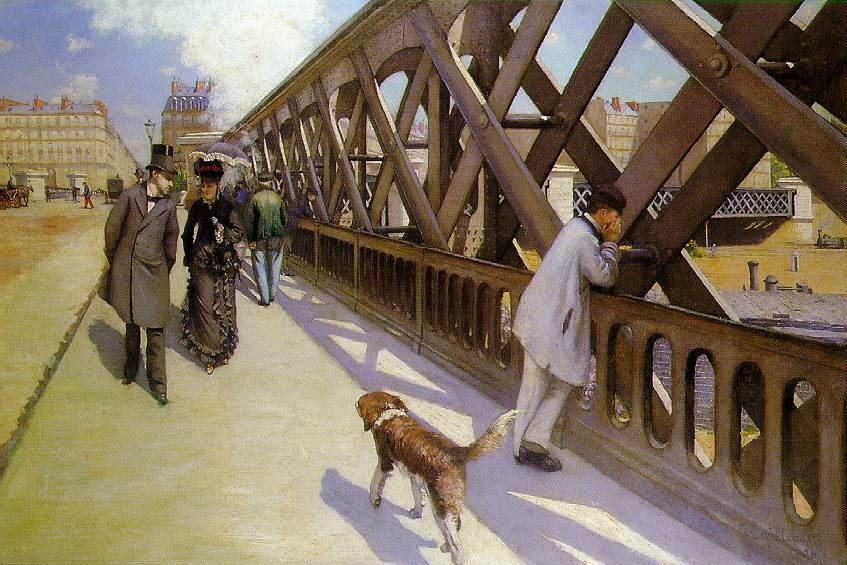
Le Pont de l'Europe c. 1876. Musée du Petit Palais, Geneva

Caillebotte first exhibited Paris Street alongside two other streetscape paintings—Le Pont de l'Europe and The House Painters—and two portraits in April 1877 at the Third Impressionist Exhibition. Critics described the painting as one the exhibition's outstanding pieces, with one naming Paris Street as "la masterpiece de l'exposition" (lit. 'the masterpiece of the exhibition'). It was widely praised for its photorealism, to the extent that Caillebotte was perceived as Impressionist merely in name. The writer Paul Sébillot claimed in one of the exhibition's earliest reviews that Paris Street provides "some areas of arresting reality", from an artist whose work offers a glimpse of what photography could look like as a fully realised medium. Most critics noted the precise architectural details and the painting's presentation of a sterile urban space, though made no mention of pedestrian interactions. Paris Street did not go without criticism; there was disapproval of the lack of rain, muted tints, and Caillebotte's manipulation of perspective.

Paris Street was not displayed publicly again until June 1894, in a posthumous retrospective organised by the art dealer Paul Durand-Ruel, which brought together 122 of his paintings. By this time, Caillebotte's reputation had waned, and the highly publicised dispute about the execution of his bequest further obscured his reputation.

=== Legacy ===
Caillebotte's reputation gradually diminished in the final twelve years of his life. While Caillebotte was an established painter in his lifetime, his standing had come from his initial success with Les raboteurs de parquet and then his role as a leader of the Impressionists. From the early 1880s, the artist retreated from exhibitions to focus on hobbies in gardening, yachting, and stamp collecting, significantly reducing his output of artwork and therefore critical attention. Caillebotte rarely loaned his art, did not sell to clients as he did not need to paint for a living to support himself, nor were any print reproductions published. Thanks to the publicity from the bequest, his reputation as a collector of Impressionist paintings eclipsed his artistic contributions. Early discourse about Impressionism thus tended to focus on Caillebotte as a patron and friend of more prolific artists if at all, with only scant coverage of his own work.

The Art Institute of Chicago's acquisition of Paris Street was the most significant catalyst generating renewed interest in Caillebotte's art in the 20th century. His revival slowly grew through international exhibitions, starting in the 1950s, that increased the visibility of his paintings to the public, and he found favour with a new generation of historians and critics. Caillebotte's fame reached its peak at the turn of the millennium, helped by the 1986 show The New Painting: Impressionism, 1874–1886 and the 1994–1996 retrospective Gustave Caillebotte: Urban Impressionist, both of which included Paris Street among several recognisable and lesser known works. The New Painting was on view at the Fine Arts Museums of San Francisco and the Washington, D.C.-based National Gallery of Art, while in Urban Impressionist, exhibitions took place at the Los Angeles County Museum of Art and London's Royal Academy of Arts, the latter in a revised form. Paris Street remains one of the Art Institute of Chicago's most popular paintings and a key work in touring exhibitions run by the museum in the 21st century, the most recent being the year-long retrospective Gustave Caillebotte: Painting Men from October 2024 to October 2025, which included a showing at the Musée d'Orsay in Paris.
