= Roger Calmel =

French composer

Roger Calmel (13 May 1920 – 4 July 1998) was a French composer. His nearly 400 works span every genre, from chamber music to opera.

== Early life ==
Originally from the Languedoc, he undertook his first musical studies in Béziers, in particular with Paul Fouquet.

In 1944, he moved to Paris to study composition at the César Franck school, before entering the Paris conservatory and winning first prize in several classes as of Counterpoint and Fugue (Plé-Claussade Class), Aesthetic class (Oliveir Messiaen class) and Composition class (Darius Milhaud class). His training benefited also from Pierre Shaeffer's influence.

The next few years witness the birth of his first major works. His personal musicality stood up through an atonal essence language that renounces neither polytonality nor tonal pivot usage.

He won the Musical Grand Prize of Paris (1958), the First Prize of the Concerts-Réferendum-Pasdeloup, the First Prize of the French musical confederation (1959), the Grand Prize of the Divonne Composition International Competition (1960), and the Grand Prize of the French Institute of chamber music (1976).

For many years Roger Calmel taught at French Radio and Television children's choir school, before becoming the head of the Darius Milhaud music conservatory in the XIVth arrondissement in Paris.

From 1991 to 1998, he worked as an inspector in Ateliers Musicaux for the Paris council. Those pedagogic activities had, without any doubts, an influence on the musician's career. Since then, and following the requests made by the "A Coeur joie" movement, Pueri Cantores and many other festivals and choirs, he spent a large part of his time writing several works based on vocal music.

Over many years, he also acted as artistic director of the Côte Languedocienne festival, a festival that he set up in Sérignan.
