= Edwin L. Cox =

American businessman and philanthropist (1921–2020)

- Born: October 20, 1921; Mena, Arkansas, US
- Died: November 5, 2020 (aged 99); Dallas, Texas, US
- Education: Southern Methodist University; Harvard Business School
- Occupation: Businessman
- Children: 1

Edwin L. Cox (October 20, 1921 – November 5, 2020) was an American businessman.

== Early life ==
Edwin Lochridge Cox Sr., was born in Mena, Arkansas. He spent his first two undergraduate years at Southern Methodist University and received an M.B.A. from the Harvard Business School.

== Career ==
Cox spent his career in oil and gas exploration. He served as CEO of the Edwin L. Cox Company, an investment company. Cox served on the board of directors of Halliburton and the American Petroleum Institute. In 1990, he was inducted into the Texas Business Hall of Fame.

== Philanthropy ==
He was a major donor to the Republican Party, and to the campaigns of Presidents George H. W. Bush and George W. Bush. He was also a major donor to the George H.W. Bush Presidential Library and Museum on the campus of Texas A&M University in College Station, Texas.

He served on the board of trustees of Southern Methodist University from 1973 to 1987, including as its chairman from 1976 to 1987. The Cox School of Business at Southern Methodist University is named for him. He served on the trustees council of the National Gallery of Art in Washington, D.C., the Library of Congress Trust Fund and the board of trustees of the Dallas Museum of Art.

== Personal life ==
Cox lived in a US $40 million mansion in Highland Park, Texas, a wealthy enclave of Dallas.

The large collection of French impressionists (Gustave Caillebotte, Cézanne and Van Gogh) compiled by Cox was auctioned off by the heirs at Christie's in 2021.
