= Martial Caillebotte =

French photographer and composer (1853–1910)

- Born: 1853
- Died: 1910 (aged 56–57)
- Occupations: Photographer, Composer, Philatelist
- Known for: Brother of Gustave Caillebotte, Philatelist

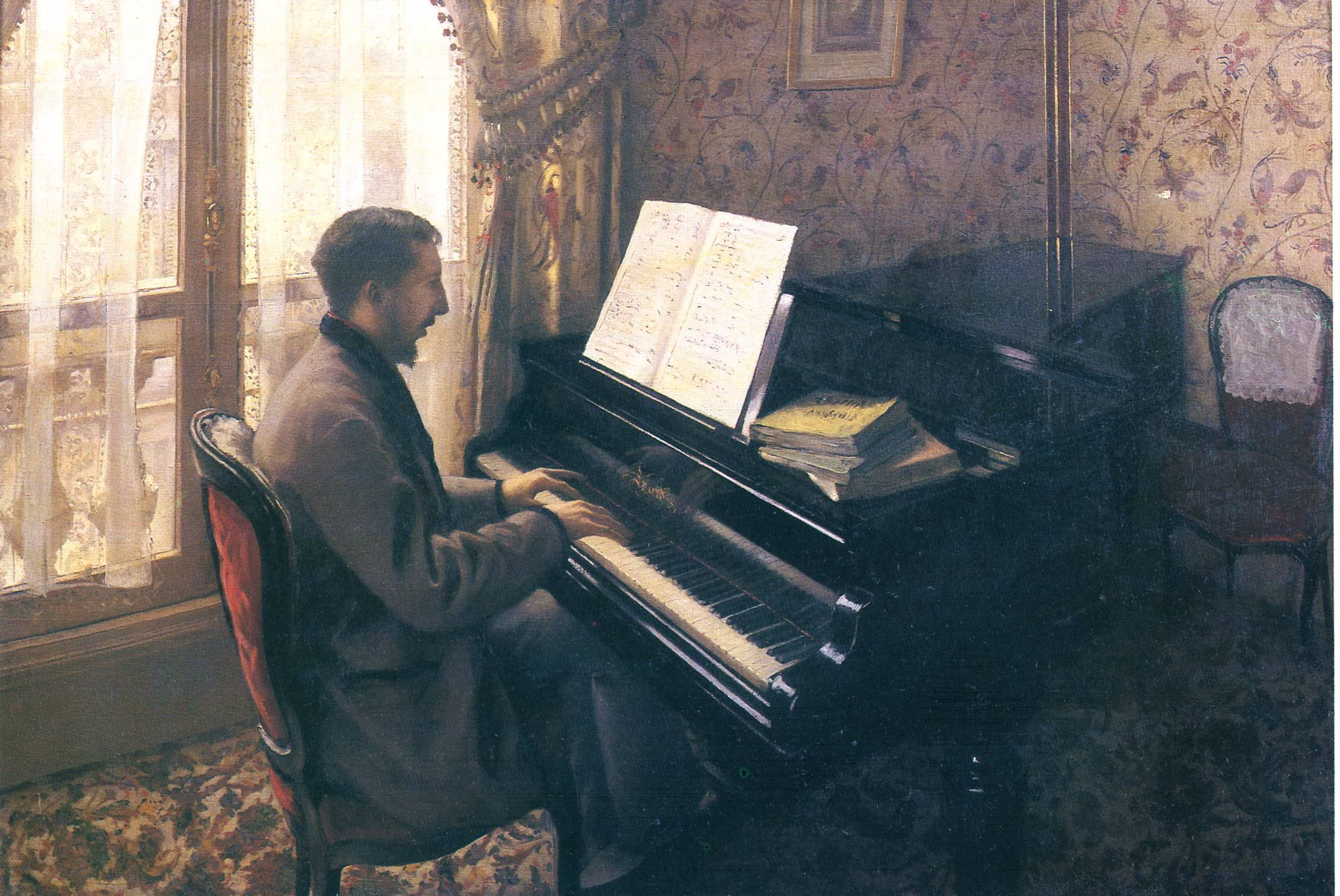
Gustave Caillebotte, Martial Caillebotte Playing the Piano, c. (1876)

Martial Caillebotte (1853–1910) was a French photographer and composer who was also one of the "Fathers of Philately", entering the Roll of Distinguished Philatelists in 1921.

Caillebotte was the younger brother of the noted artist Gustave Caillebotte (1848–1894), and they both inherited a fortune from their father, enabling them to pursue their respective passions throughout their lives. He married Marie Minoret on 7 June 1887. In 1888, his wife gave birth to a son, Jean, and in 1889 to a daughter, Geneviève. Geneviève inherited the majority of unsold paintings of Gustave Caillebotte.

Martial and Gustave formed a joint stamp collection around 1878 that grew to be one of the most important of its time, but Martial disposed of it in 1887, about ten years after his marriage. The purchaser, with whom the brothers worked on the plating, or reconstruction of the original sheet, of important issues including the Sydney View two-pence stamp of Australia, was Thomas Tapling, whose collection, including the Caillebotte collection, is part of the philatelic collection of the British Library.

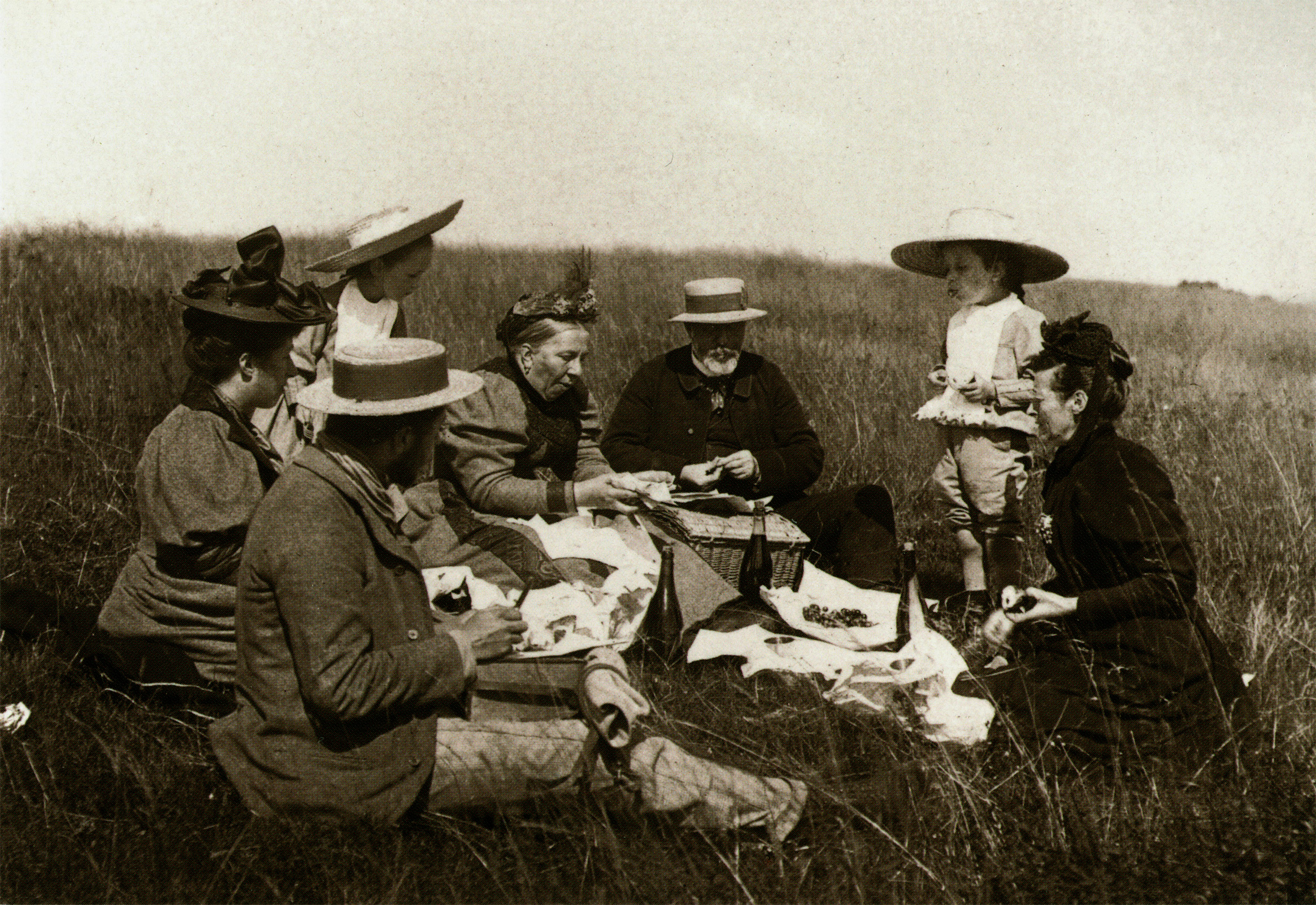
A photograph of the Caillebotte family taken by Martial Caillebotte

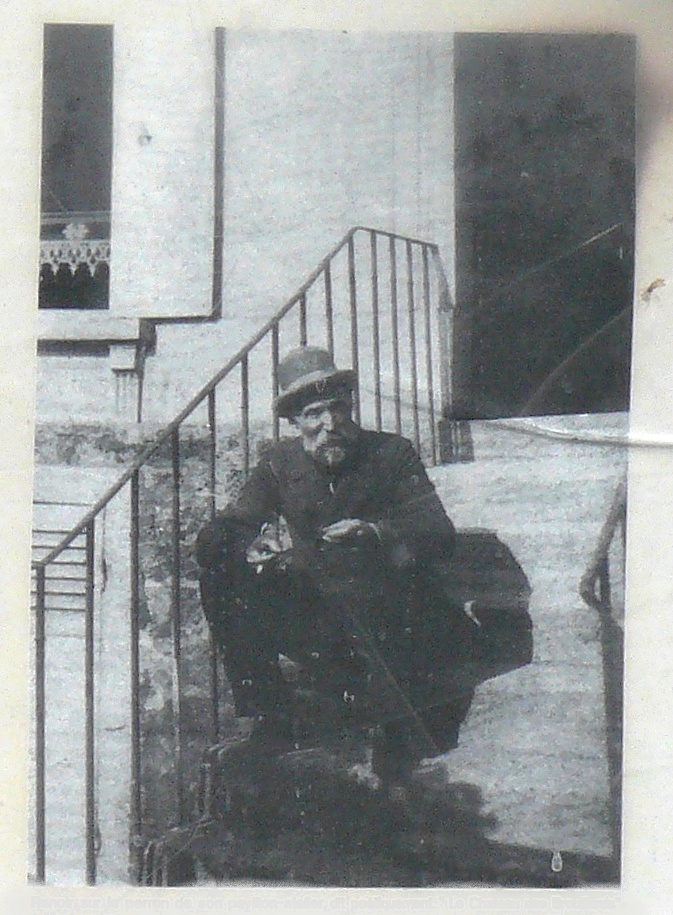
Pierre-Auguste Renoir at Montmartre in a photograph by Martial Caillebotte.

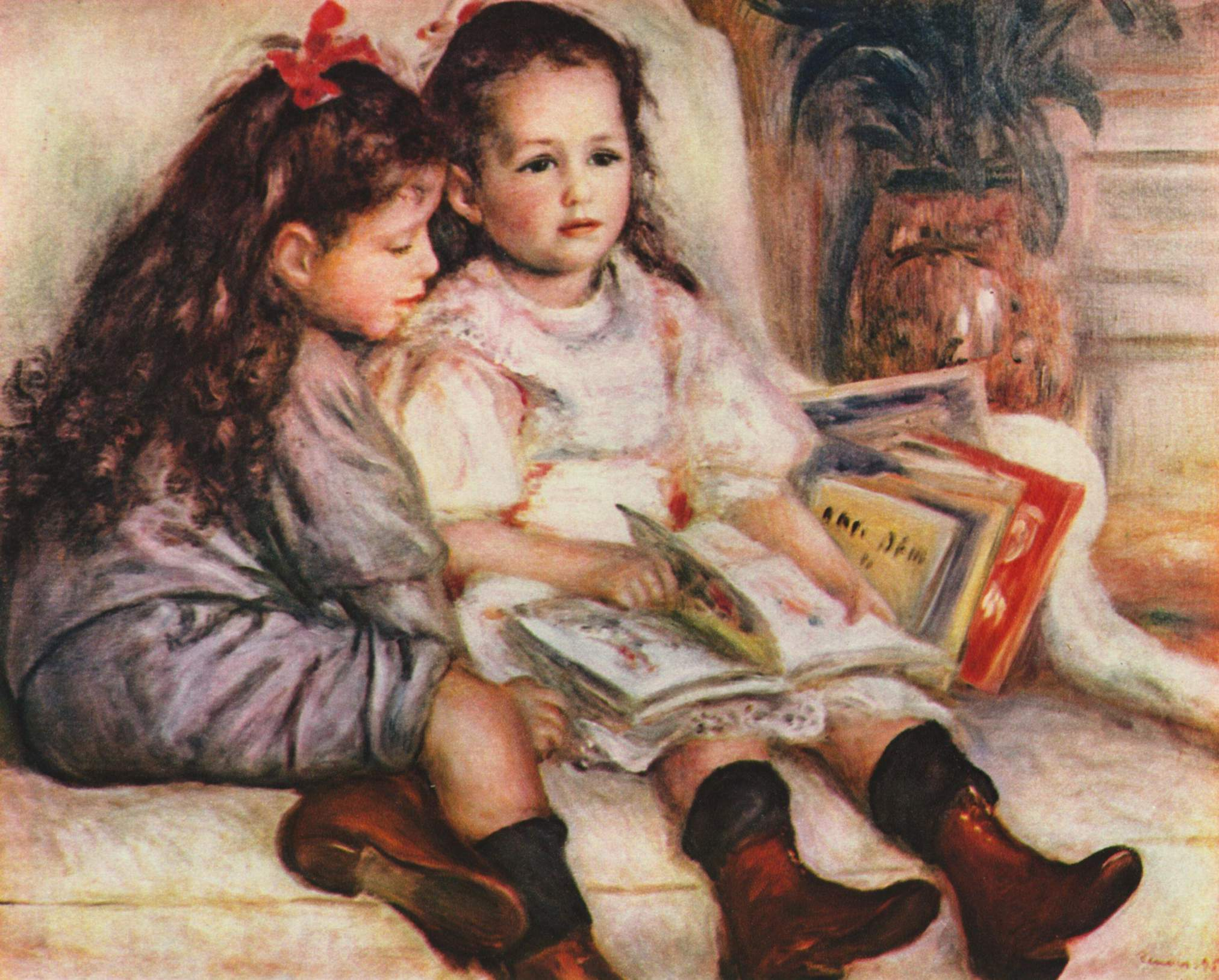
Pierre-Auguste Renoir, Portrait of Jean and Geneviève Caillebotte, 1895
