= Villeneuve-la-Garenne (painting) =

1872 painting by Alfred Sisley

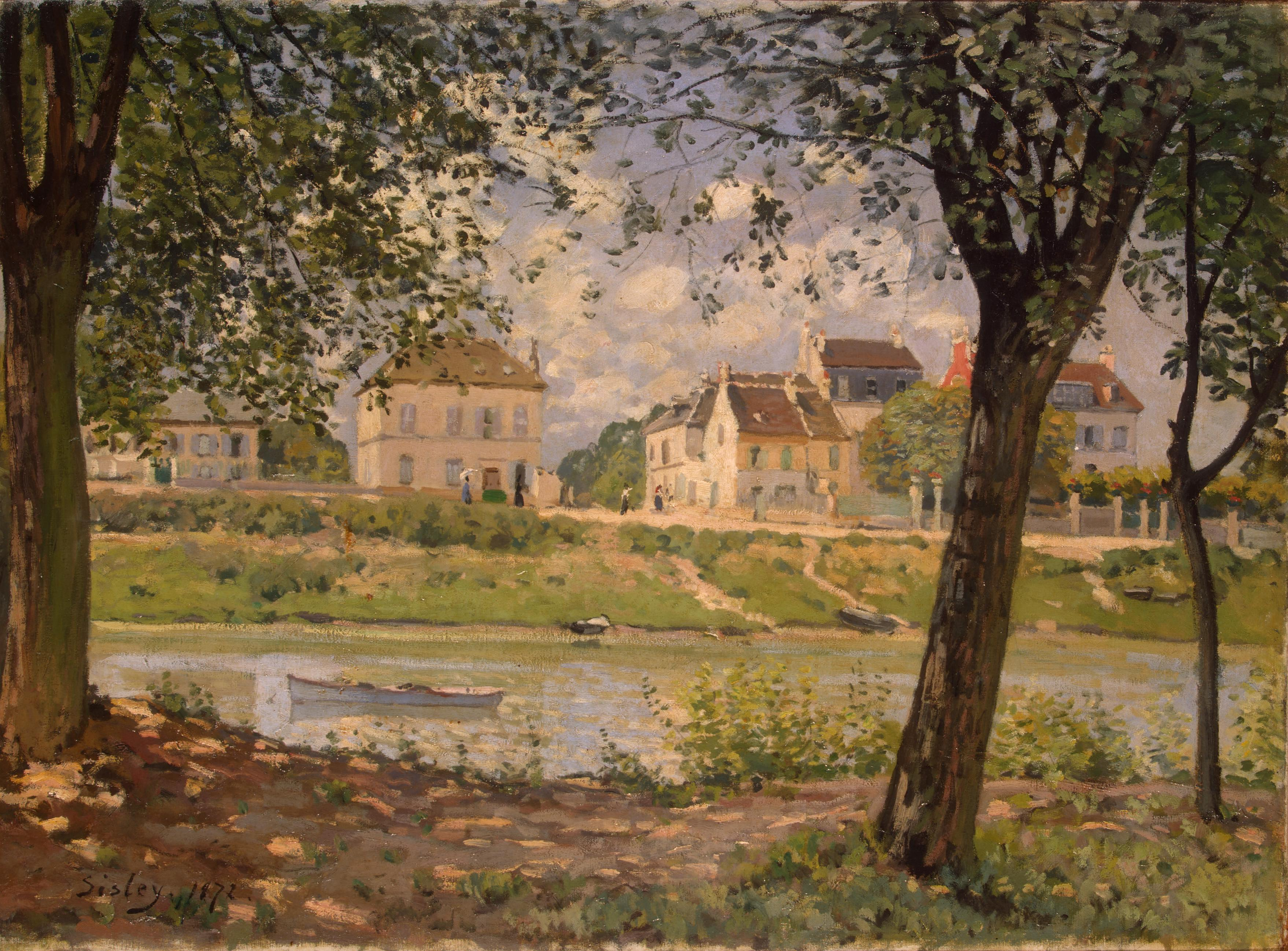
- Artist: Alfred Sisley
- Year: 1872
- Medium: Oil on canvas
- Dimensions: 59 cm × 80.5 cm (23 in × 31.7 in)
- Location: Hermitage Museum, St Petersburg

Villeneuve-la-Garenne, Village Beside the Seine or Village on the Seine is an 1872 oil-on-canvas painting by Alfred Sisley, now in the Hermitage Museum in St Petersburg.

== History ==
Sisley visited Villeneuve-la-Garenne, producing at least five paintings there. Its composition recalls that of The Seine at Bennecourt (1868; Art Institute of Chicago) by Sisley's friend Claude Monet. Just out of frame to the left is the town's bridge, the subject of Sisley's The Bridge at Villeneuve-la-Garenne (Metropolitan Museum of Art).

Sisley sold it to Paul Durand-Ruel on 24 August 1872. It was acquired in 1898 by Pyotr Shchukin of Moscow, then by Sergei Shchukin in 1912. After the October Revolution of 1918 it entered the Museum of Western Modern Art, before moving to its present home in 1948.

== See also ==
- List of paintings by Alfred Sisley
