= Avenue of Chestnut Trees near La Celle-Saint-Cloud =

Painting by Alfred Sisley

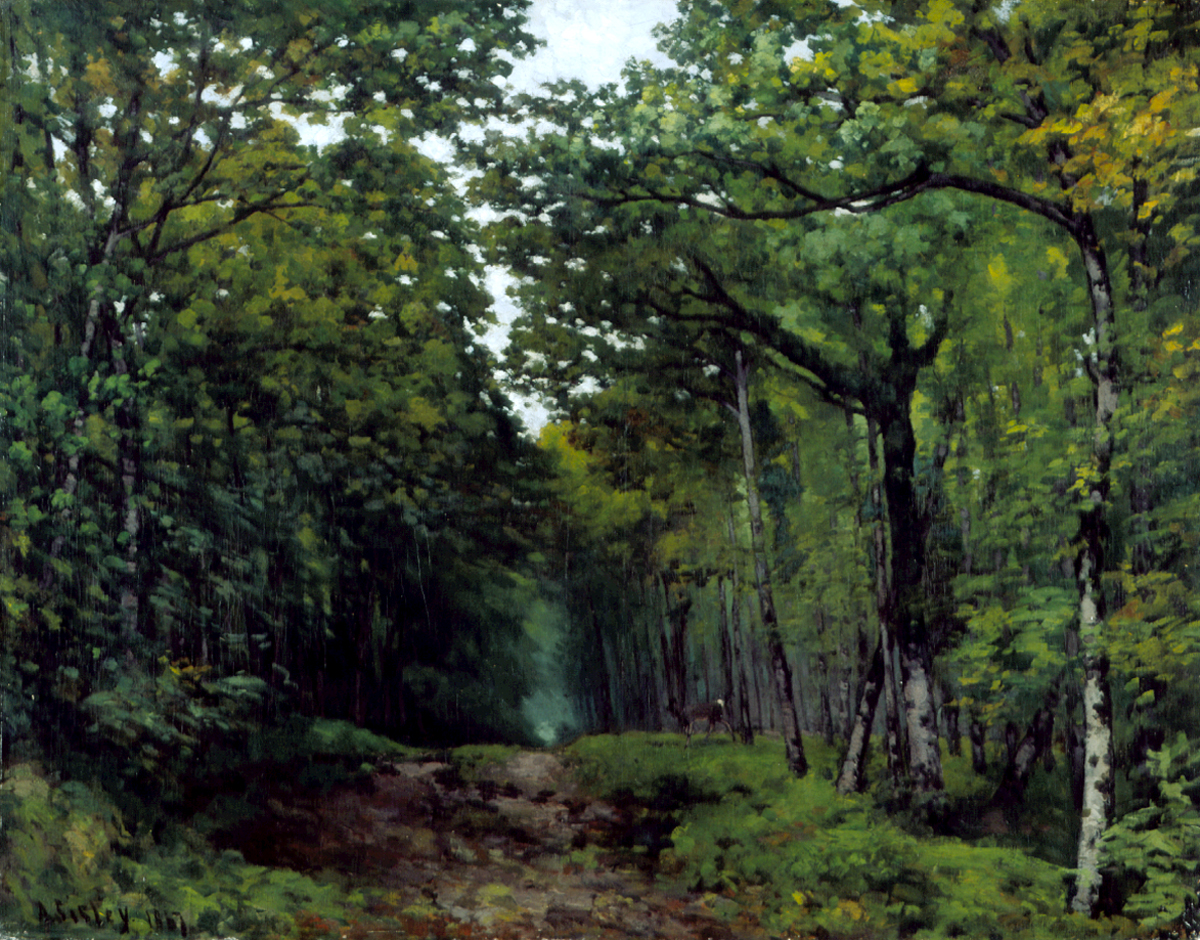
- Artist: Alfred Sisley
- Year: 1867
- Type: Oil on canvas, landscape painting
- Dimensions: 95.5 cm × 122.2 cm (37.6 in × 48.1 in)
- Location: Southampton City Art Gallery; Southampton

Avenue of Chestnut Trees near La Celle-Saint-Cloud is an 1867 landscape painting by the British-French artist Alfred Sisley. It features a view in the forest at La Celle-Saint-Cloud, then some miles from Paris but now on the outskirts of the western suburbs. It shows a track running through the woods through an avenue of chestnut trees. A lone deer is shown just to the right of the track in the otherwise empty landscape.

Sisley had submitted an earlier work of a similarly titled but completely different composition Avenue of Chestnut Trees at La Celle-Saint-Cloud to the Salon of 1865, but it was rejected by the authorities. By contrast this painting was accepted for the exhibition at the Salon of 1868. It shows the strong influence of the Barbizon school, which combined elements of Romanticism and Realism, than the Impressionist movement for which he is best known.

The painting is now in the collection of the Southampton City Art Gallery which acquired the work in 1936. The earlier painting is now in the Petit Palais in Paris. Both are there early surviving paintings as much of his work was destroyed during the Franco-Prussian War.

== See also ==
- List of paintings by Alfred Sisley

== Bibliography ==
- Dumas, Ann. (ed )Inspiring Impressionism: The Impressionists and the Art of the Past. Denver Art Museum, 2007.
- House, John Impressions of France: Monet, Renoir, Pissarro, and Their Rivals. Museum of Fine Arts, 1995.
