= The Canal Saint-Martin (painting) =

1872 painting by Alfred Sisley

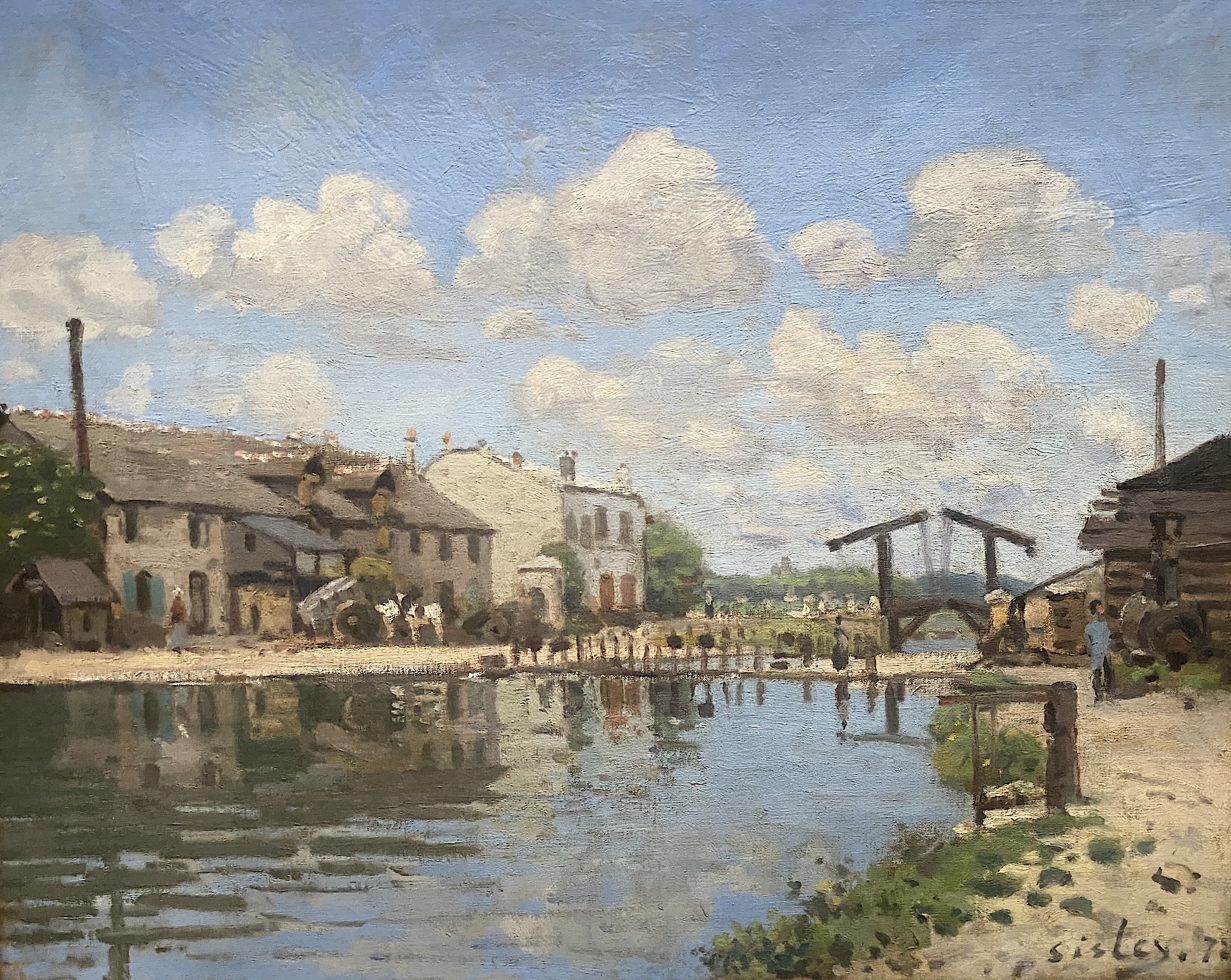
- Artist: Alfred Sisley
- Year: 1872
- Medium: Oil on canvas
- Dimensions: 38 cm × 46.5 cm (15 in × 18.3 in)
- Location: Musée d'Orsay, Paris

The Canal Saint-Martin is an 1872 painting by Alfred Sisley, now in the Musée d'Orsay, after being given to the French state in 1907 by Étienne Moreau-Nélaton. The artist was living near the Canal Saint-Martin and the painting formed part of a series of four works showing the canal - another was View of the Canal Saint-Martin. Sisley would have chosen the canal as the subject of a series of 4 canvases because it is an industrial infrastructure and it was close to it.

== See also ==
- List of paintings by Alfred Sisley
