= Moret Church (Sisley series) =

Series of paintings by Alfred Sisley

The Church at Moret in the Morning Sun
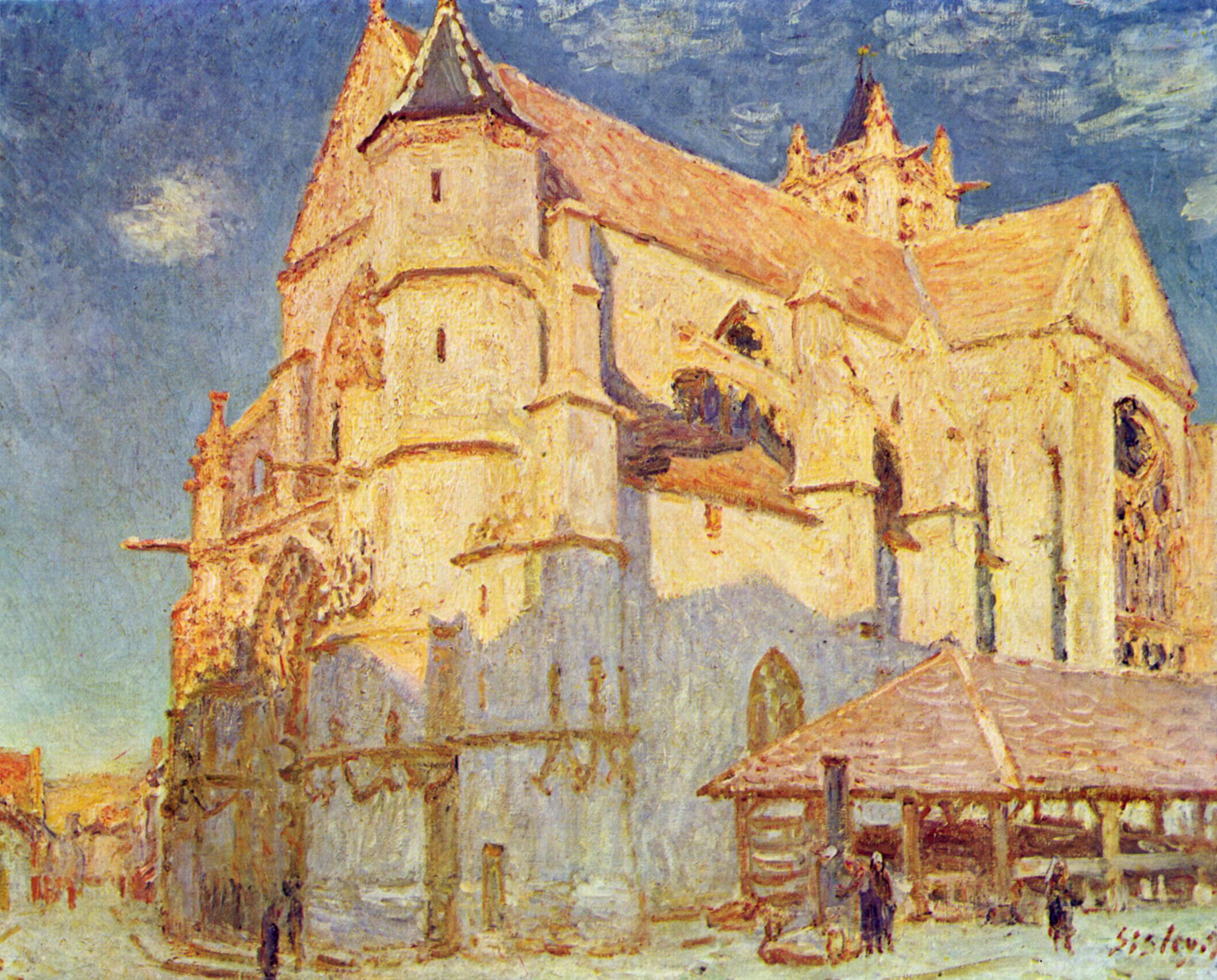
- Artist: Alfred Sisley
- Year: 1893
- Medium: Oil on canvas
- Dimensions: 65 cm × 81 cm (26 in × 32 in)
- Location: Musée des Beaux-Arts de Rouen, Rouen, France

The Moret Church series of some dozen oil paintings was executed in 1893/94 by the English Impressionist artist Alfred Sisley. The church building depicted in each of the paintings is the Church of Notre-Dame in the village of Moret-sur-Loing, Seine-et-Marne, France, where Sisley had elected to see out his days until his death in 1899.

In emulation of Claude Monet, who was himself capturing a series of images of Rouen cathedral during the same period, Sisley portrayed Moret church at different times of day, in different weather conditions and in different seasons of the year. The series of paintings, depicting the church's west entrance and the southern wall of the nave, were all created from the same vantage point, an upstairs window in his house across from the church. In contrast with Monet, however, Sisley's canvasses are more restrained and detailed, recording more accurately what he could see.

The works in the series are now distributed around the world and are on display in France, the United States, Switzerland, Scotland and Hungary.

Other works in the series

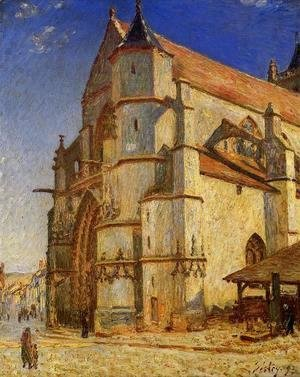
The Church in Morning Sun - 1893 - Kunstmuseum Winterthur, Switzerland

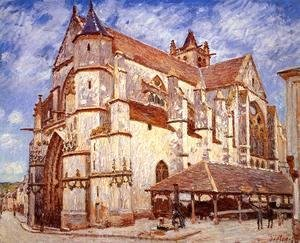
The Church in Afternoon Sun - 1893

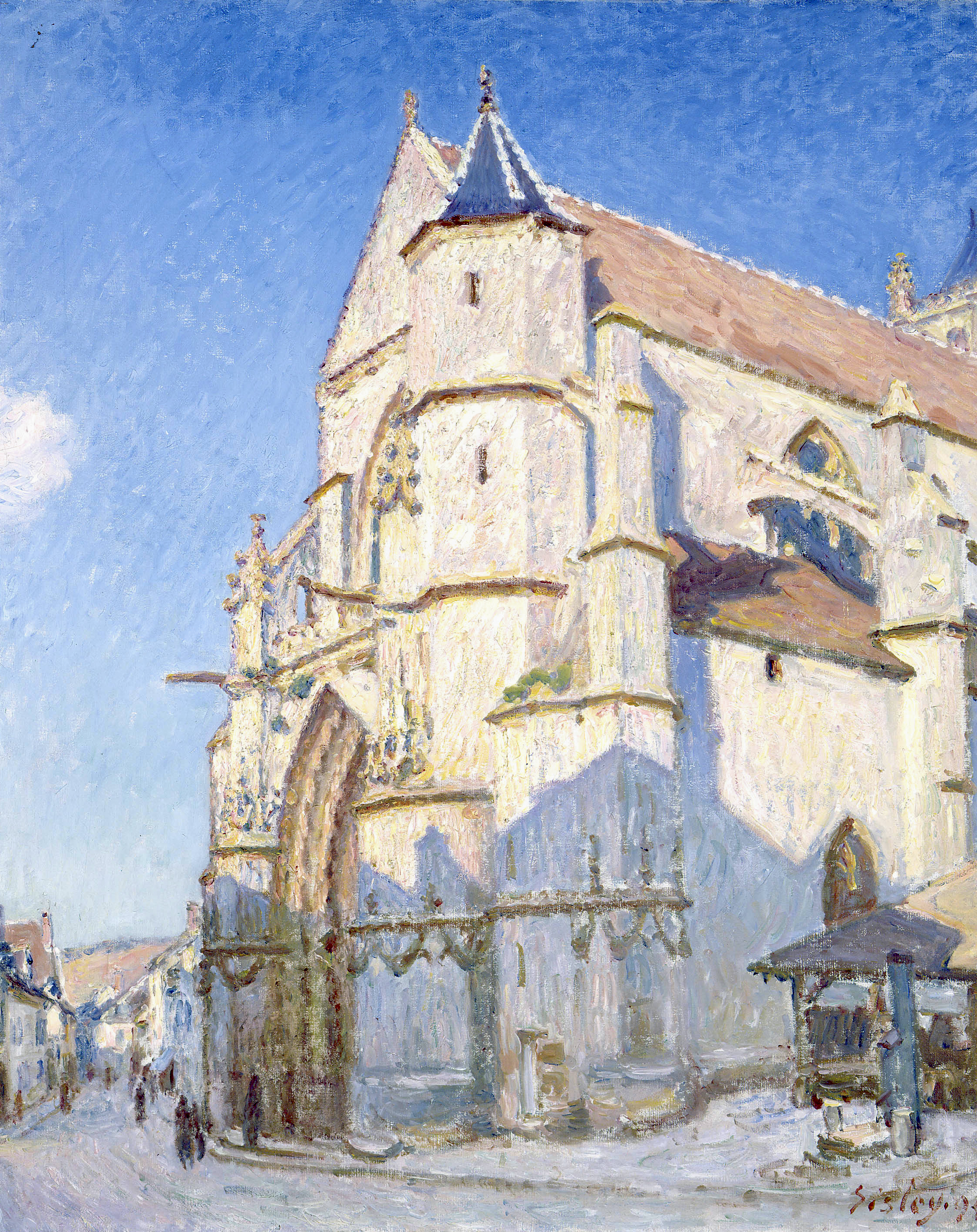
The Church in the Evening Sun - 1894 - Petit Palais, Paris

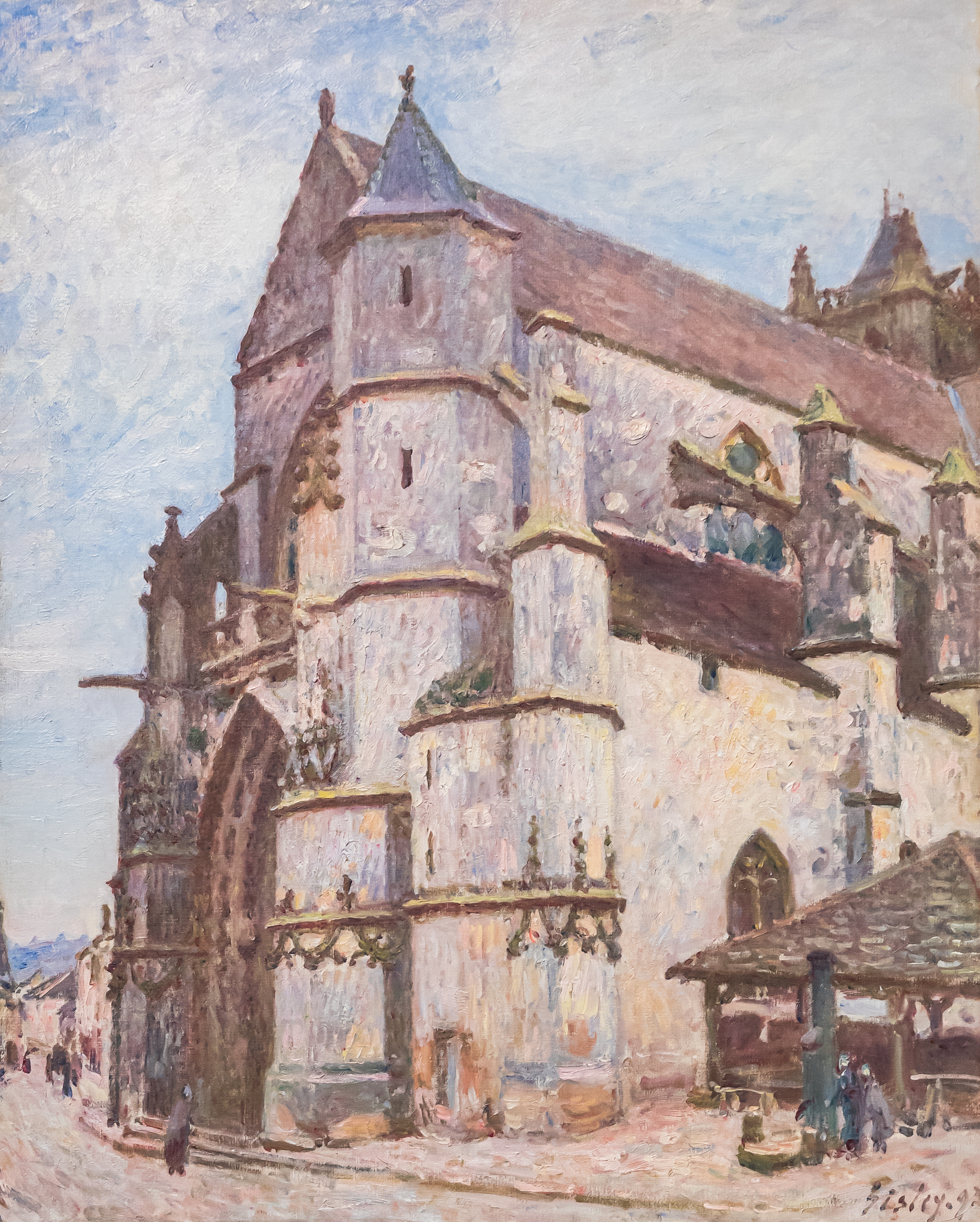
The Church in Morning Rain - 1893 - Hunterian Art Gallery, University of Glasgow, Scotland

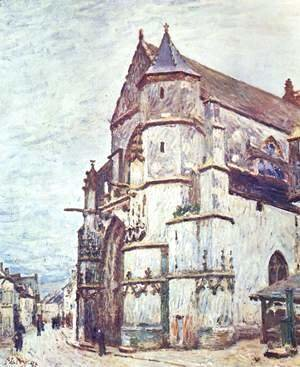
The Church after Rain - 1894 - Detroit Institute of Arts, USA

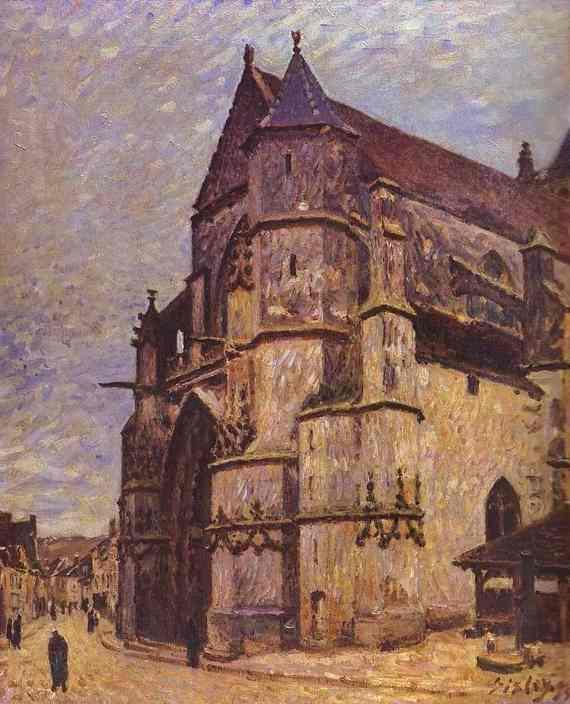
The Church in Winter - 1893–94 - National Museum of Art of Romania, Romania

== See also ==
- List of paintings by Alfred Sisley
