= Drying Nets =

Painting by Alfred Sisley

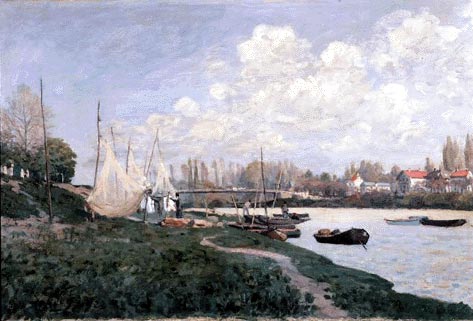
- Artist: Alfred Sisley
- Year: 1872
- Medium: Oil on canvas
- Dimensions: 42 cm × 65 cm (17 in × 26 in)
- Location: Kimbell Art Museum, Fort Worth

Drying Nets or Fishermen Spreading Their Nets is an 1872 oil-on-canvas painting by Alfred Sisley, now in the Kimbell Art Museum. The painting shows a scene near the village of Villeneuve-la-Garenne.

Like The Seine at Argenteuil painted the same year and The Seine at Port-Marly, Piles of Sand, it shows people at work on the River Seine near Argenteuil, Val-d'Oise. These contrast with the many works by Sisley and the other Impressionists that show the Seine as a place of leisure.

== See also ==
- List of paintings by Alfred Sisley
