= The Seine at Port-Marly, Piles of Sand =

Painting by Alfred Sisley

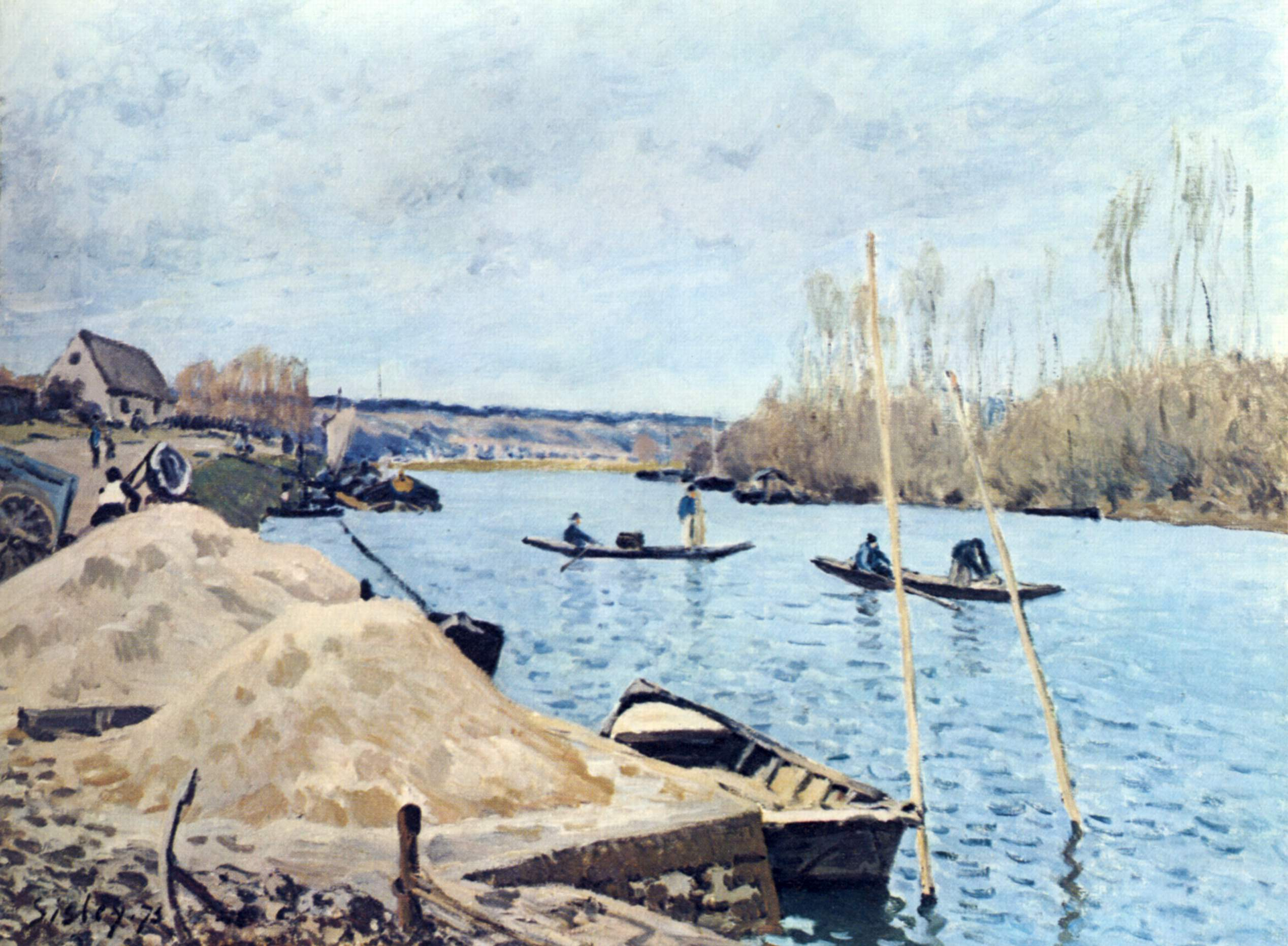
- Artist: Alfred Sisley
- Year: 1875
- Medium: Oil on canvas
- Dimensions: 54.5 cm × 73.7 cm (21.5 in × 29.0 in)
- Location: Art Institute of Chicago

The Seine at Port-Marly, Piles of Sand (French La Seine à Port-Marly, tas de sable) is an 1875 painting by Alfred Sisley. It was exhibited at the Exposition Universelle in 1900 whilst in the collection of Dr. Georges Viau, a Paris dentist and art collector. By 4 March 1907 it was owned by Durand-Ruel, who tried and failed to auction it on 4 March that year. It was bought by the galerie Bernheim-Jeune in April 1920 and later by Martin A. Ryerson. In 1933 Ryerson left it to its present owner, the Art Institute of Chicago, where it is now in section 201 (Impressionists) on the 1st floor of the Art Institute of Chicago.

As in his Drying Nets and The Seine at Argenteuil of three years earlier, it shows the River Seine as a workplace near Port-Marly. This contrasts with most of the rest of his work which - like the other Impressionists - showed the Seine as a place of leisure.

At the centre of the painting two men on a flat-bottomed barge dredging the Seine to create a navigable channel for péniches travelling between Le Havre and Paris, the main means of transporting goods in that era. The ochre colours of the sand contrast with the turquoise blue of the water. Sisley shows the town's paper factory, though (unlike in his 1875 The Sand Quay, Port-Marly) he has removed its chimney, showing the smoke emerging from the opening in the gable. He was interested in the sand-extraction industry and painted this and several other works on the quayside at Port-Marly itself.

== See also ==
- List of paintings by Alfred Sisley
