= The Edge of Fontainebleau Forest =

Painting by Alfred Sisley

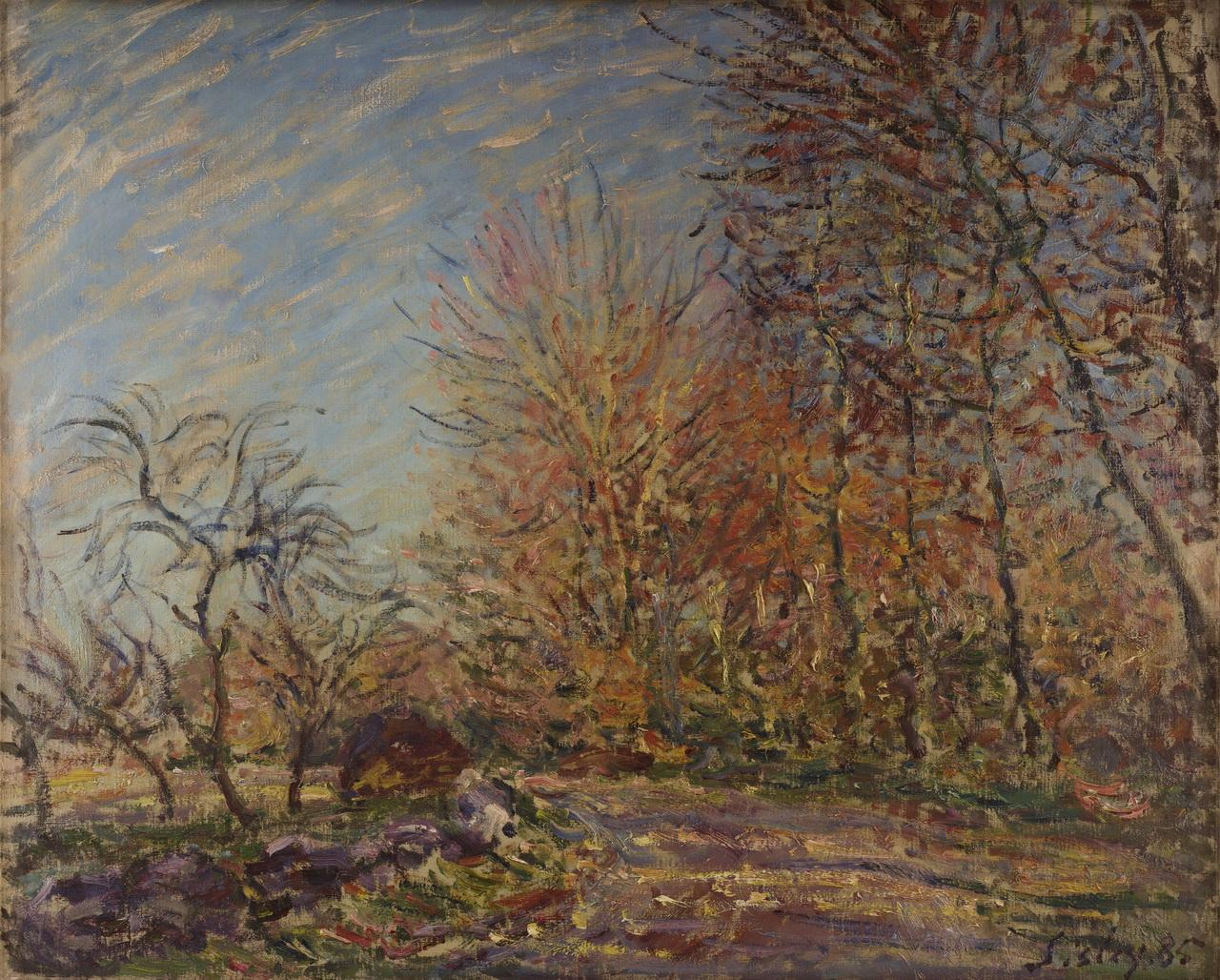
- Artist: Alfred Sisley
- Year: 1885
- Medium: Oil on canvas
- Dimensions: 60 cm × 73 cm (24 in × 29 in)
- Location: Pushkin Museum, Moscow

The Edge of Fontainebleau Forest (French - La lisière de la Foret de Fontainebleau or Lisière de la foret de Fontainebleau mass) is an oil on canvas painting by Alfred Sisley, from 1885, now in the Pushkin Museum, in Moscow. On the reverse are the two French titles and labels from Paul Durand-Ruel's Paris and New York. A similar landscape by the artist, In the Forest in Autumn, is now in a private collection in Switzerland.

It was first owned by Jean-Baptiste Faure, before being bought from his wife on 1 March 1900 by Durand-Ruel. Ivan Morozov bought it for 9500 francs on 29 April 1905 and it was placed in the State Museum of Modern Western Art in 1923 when his collection was seized by the state in the wake of the October Revolution. When that museum was closed down in 1948 it was moved to its present home.

Soviet art historian Professor Nina Nikolaevna Kalitina was very critical of the work - in particular she noted that in the 1880s:

There are no abrupt changes in [Sisley's] work, but he began to rush about, trying to achieve greater expressiveness, enhancing the colour of colour and sweeping strokes. This is felt in the landscape "The Edge of Fontainebleau" ... You can follow every movement of the brush, throwing paint onto the canvas with some kind of fever ... Did such a manner of painting. Did such an increased intensity of colour correspond to Sisley's talent? Hardly.

== See also ==
- List of paintings by Alfred Sisley
