= Chemin de la Machine, Louveciennes =

1873 painting by Alfred Sisley

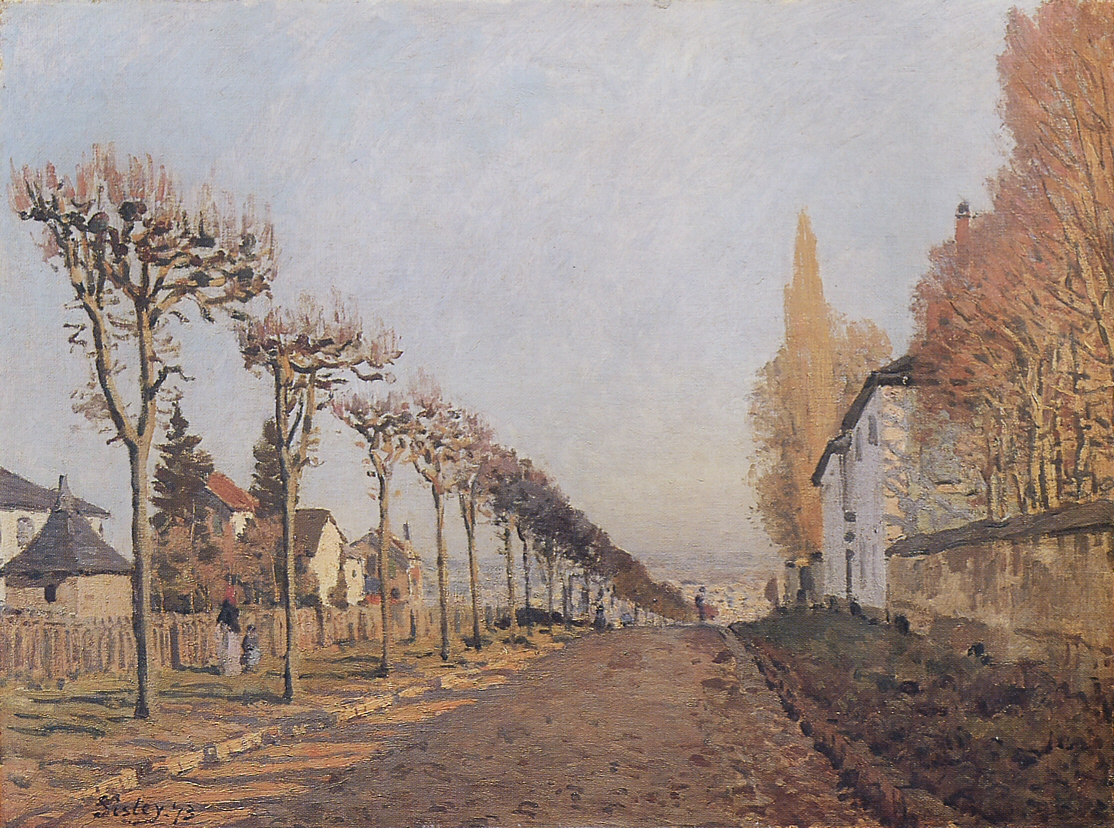
- Artist: Alfred Sisley
- Year: 1873
- Medium: Oil on canvas
- Dimensions: 54.5 cm × 73 cm (21.5 in × 29 in)
- Location: Musée d'Orsay, Paris

Chemin de la Machine, Louveciennes (alternatively titled Route de Sèvres near Louveciennes) is an 1873 painting by Alfred Sisley. Exhibited at the Exposition Universelle of 1900, it entered the Louvre in 1918 from the collection of Joanny Peytel, and has been in the Musée d'Orsay since 1986.

== Description ==
It is an oil on canvas that measures 54 × 73 cm, a large size. The clarity of the sky which accentuates the impression of cold contrasts with the brown tones of the ground which are reinforced by the oblique light. The road running perpendicular to the surface of the painting gives the illusion of a three-dimensional representation. The impression of depth is reinforced by the row of trees, punctuating the trunks and their shadows with vertical and horizontal lines. The rise creates an off-center vanishing point, towards a bird's eye view of the sunny background. Like Johan Barthold Jongkind, Sisley humanizes the landscape, introducing small silhouettes.

== Interpretation ==
Le Chemin de la Machine, Louveciennes is reminiscent of Meindert Hobbema's The Avenue at Middelharnis (1689, London, National Gallery), which Sisley was able to see during his first stay in London. The direction of the construction may reveal the influence of Jean-Baptiste Camille Corot, and the important place of the sky recalls Salomon van Ruysdael, one of the masters of the Dutch landscape of the 17th century.

== See also ==
- List of paintings by Alfred Sisley
