= The Banks of the Oise =

Painting by Alfred Sisley

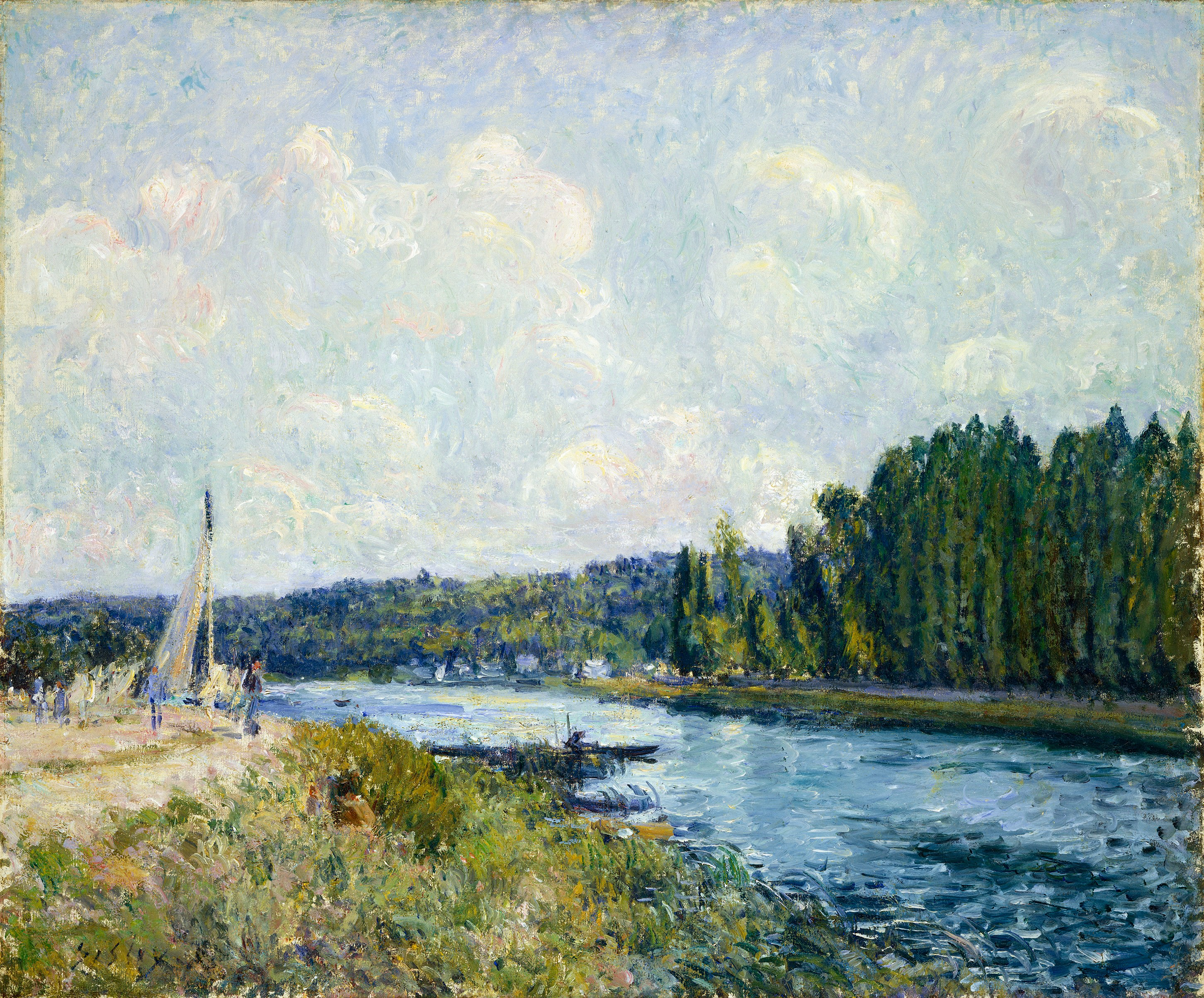
- Artist: Alfred Sisley
- Year: 1877–1878
- Medium: oil on canvas
- Dimensions: 54.29 cm × 65 cm (21.375 in × 25.5 in)
- Location: National Gallery of Art, Washington, DC

The Banks of the Oise is an 1877–1878 painting by Alfred Sisley. Previously owned by three private galleries (the Bernheim-Jeune in Paris, the Dilenn in Brussels and finally the Galerie Jacques Dubourg in Paris) it was sold to Chester Dale on 9 June 1926. It is now owned by the National Gallery of Art in Washington, D.C., which acquired it with the rest of Dale's collection - it is now on display in section 88 (French Impressionist landscapes).

== See also ==
- List of paintings by Alfred Sisley
