= The Seine at Bougival =

Painting by Alfred Sisley

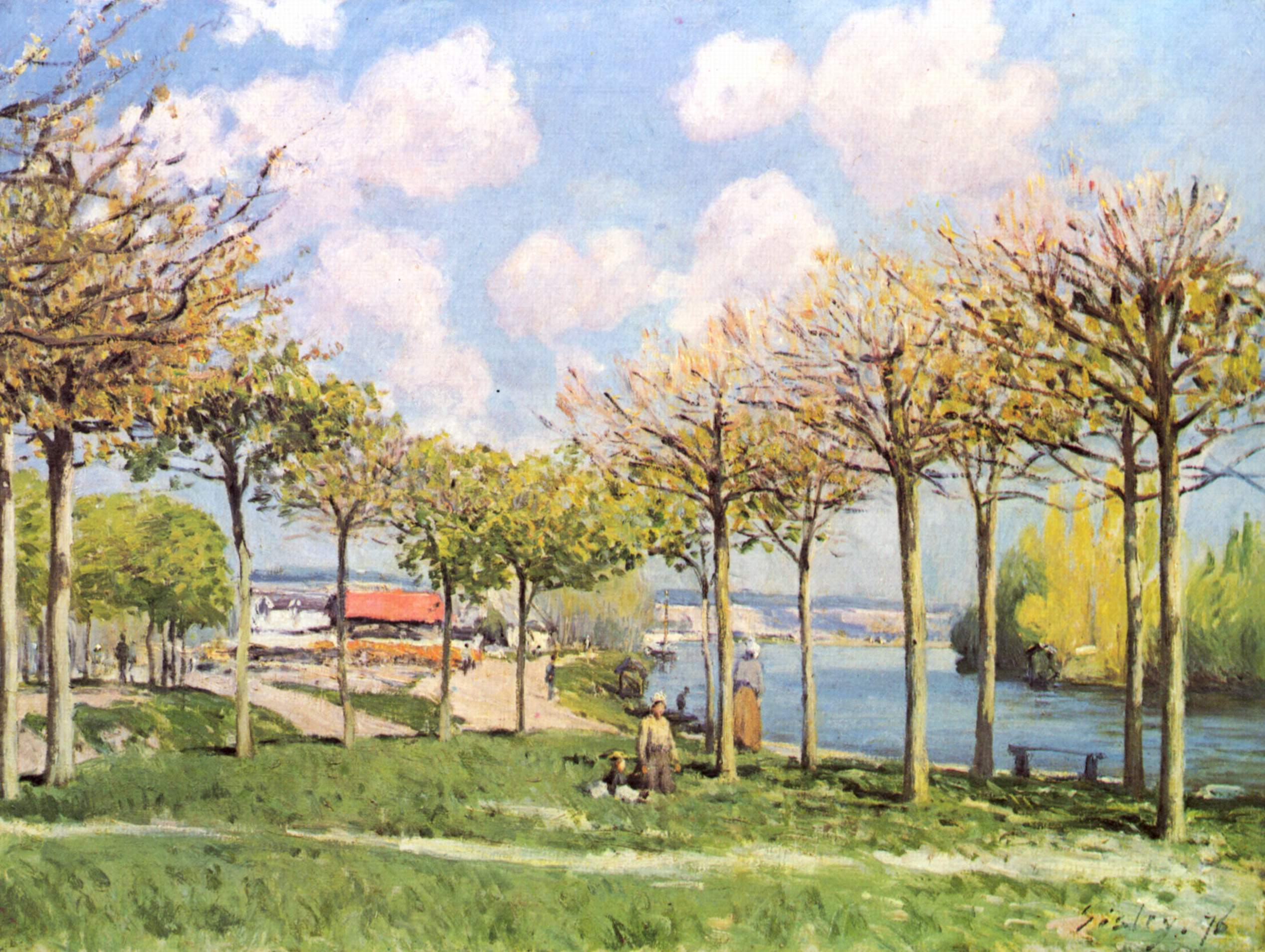
- Artist: Alfred Sisley
- Year: 1876
- Medium: Oil on canvas
- Dimensions: 46.4 cm × 61.3 cm (18.3 in × 24.1 in)
- Location: Metropolitan Museum of Art, New York City

The Seine at Bougival is an 1876 painting by Alfred Sisley, now in the Impressionist section of the Metropolitan Museum of Art, which acquired it in 1992 as a promised and partial gift of Mr and Mrs Douglas Dillon. It shows part of the Seine near Bougival.

== See also ==
- List of paintings by Alfred Sisley
