= The Village of Voisins =

1874 painting by Alfred Sisley

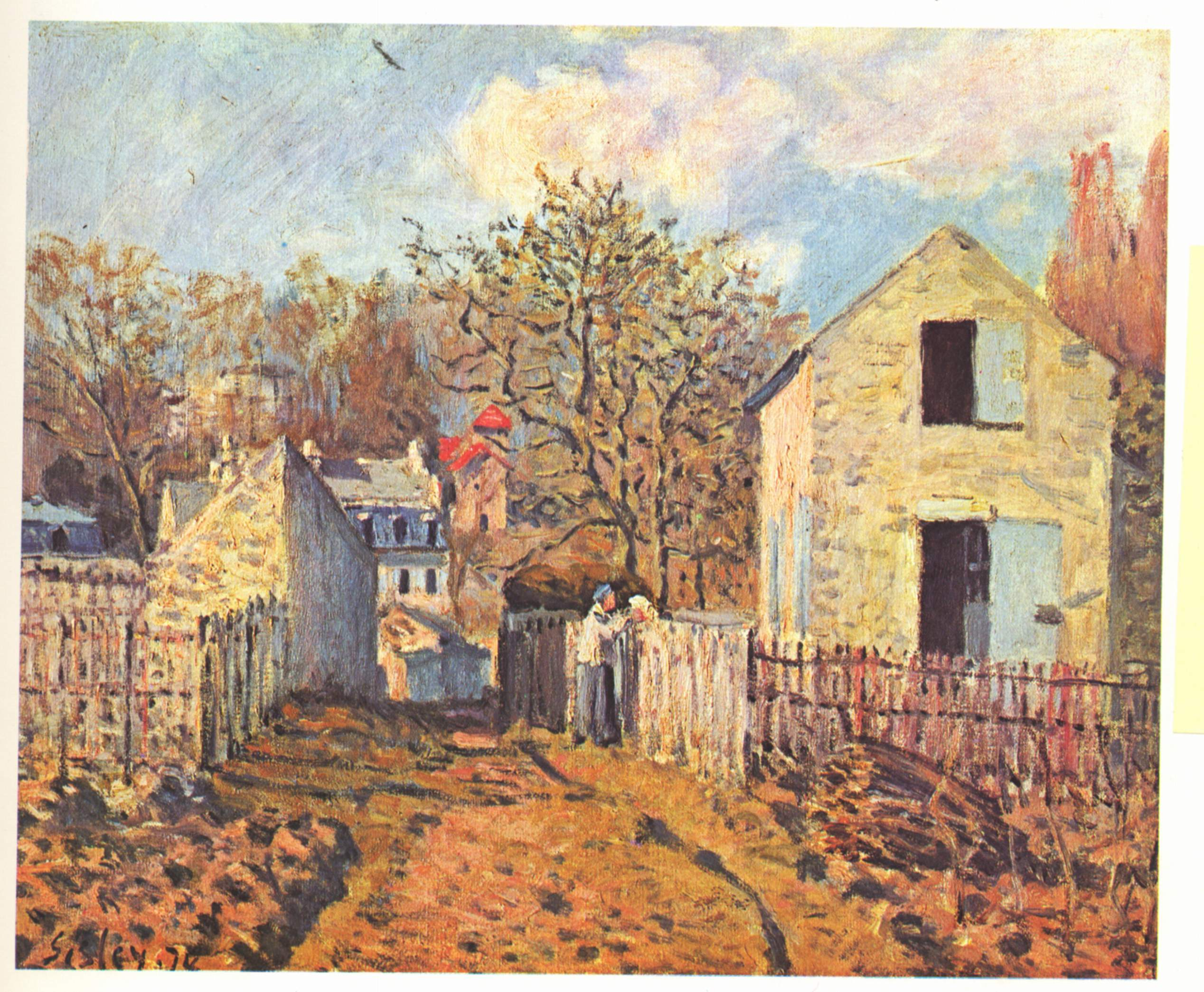
- Artist: Alfred Sisley
- Year: 1874
- Medium: Oil on canvas
- Dimensions: 38 cm × 47 cm (15 in × 19 in)
- Location: Musée d'Orsay, Paris

The Village of Voisins is an 1874 painting by Alfred Sisley, now in the Musée d'Orsay after being left to the French state in 1911 by count Isaac de Camondo. The village shown in the work now forms as district in the town of Louveciennes, where Sisley lived from 1870 to 1874.

== See also ==
- List of paintings by Alfred Sisley
