= Resting by a Stream at the Edge of the Wood =

Painting by Alfred Sisley

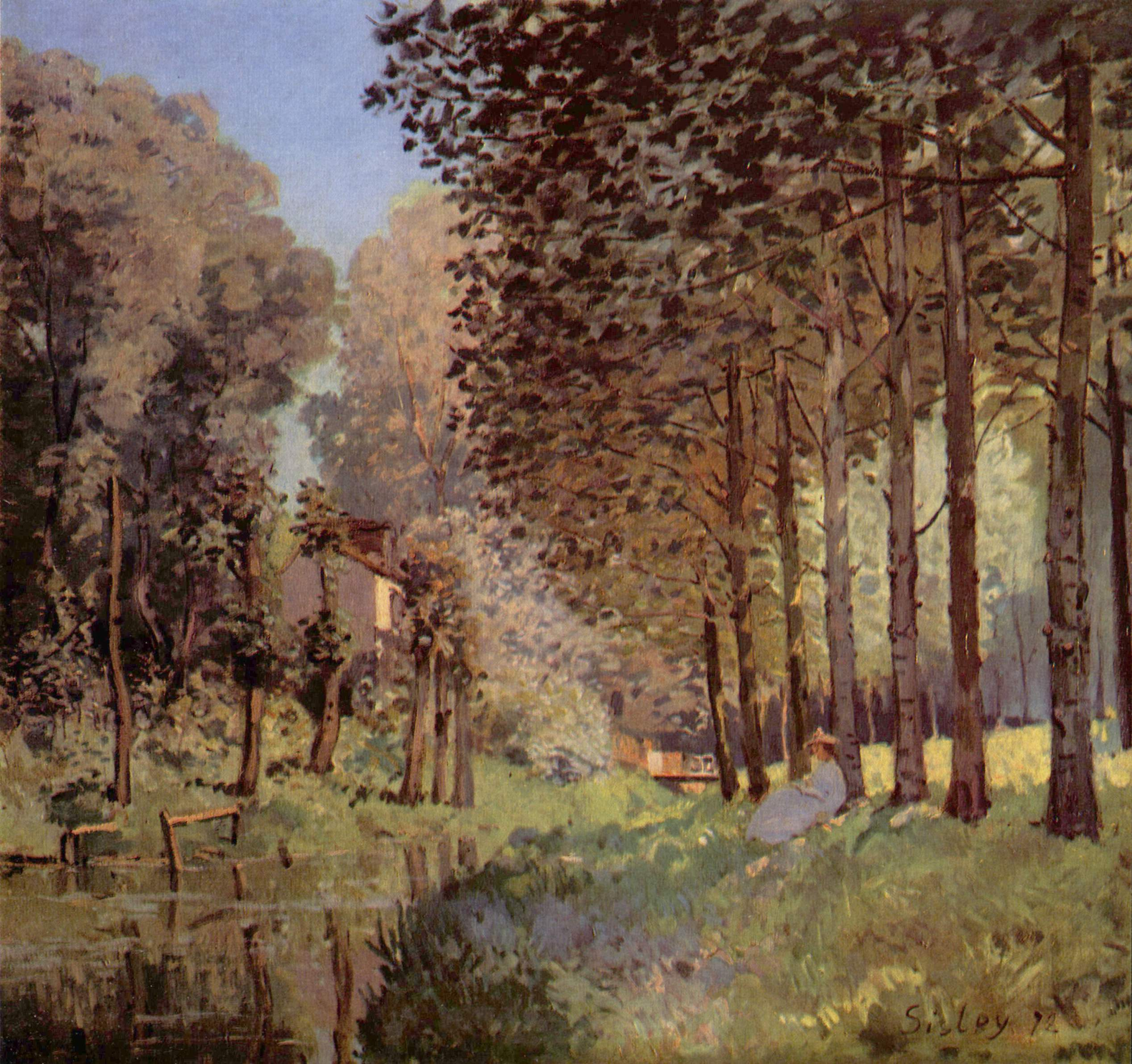
- Artist: Alfred Sisley
- Year: 1878
- Medium: oil on canvas
- Dimensions: 73.5 cm × 80.5 cm (28.9 in × 31.7 in)
- Location: Musée d'Orsay, Paris

Resting by a Stream at the Edge of the Wood is an 1878 painting by Alfred Sisley, now in the Musée d'Orsay. It was given to the French state in 1906 as part of Étienne Moreau-Nélaton's collection

== See also ==
- List of paintings by Alfred Sisley
