= Ferry to the Ile-de-la-Loge – Flood =

1872 painting by Alfred Sisley

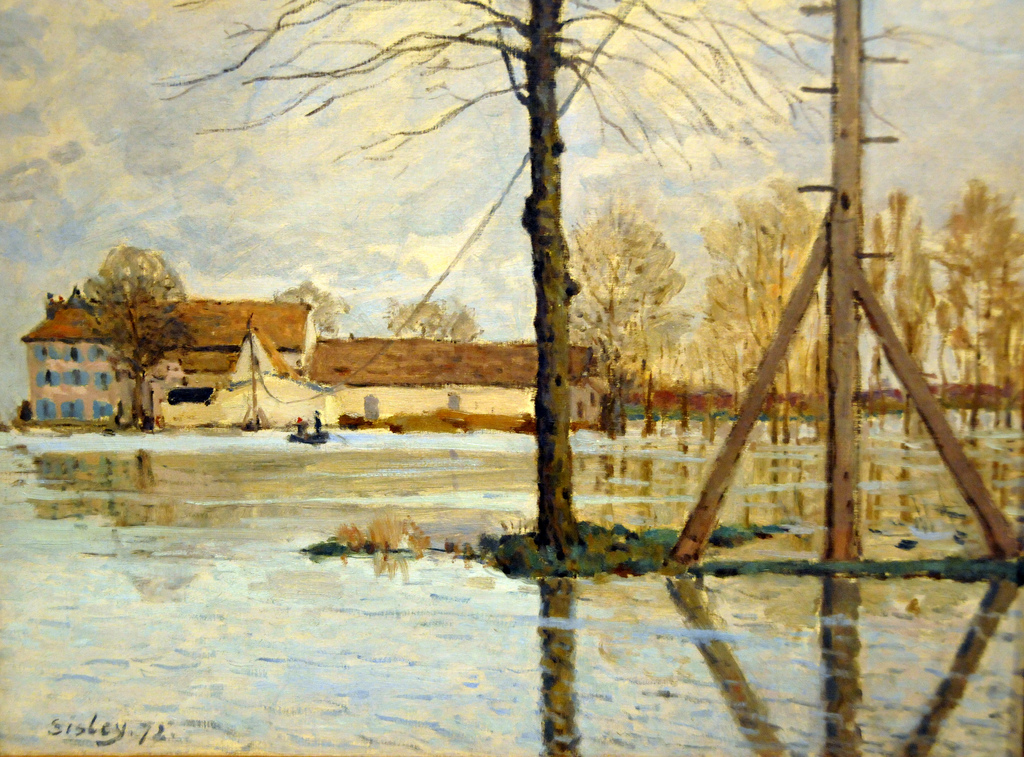
- Artist: Alfred Sisley
- Year: 1872
- Medium: Oil on canvas
- Dimensions: 45 cm × 60 cm (18 in × 24 in)
- Location: Ny Carlsberg Glyptotek, Copenhagen

Ferry to the Ile-de-la-Loge – Flood is a painting by Alfred Sisley. He produced it during a flood on the Seine, which had begun in late October and reached its peak on 17 December. The painting was finished in December 1872. It was bought for 200 francs by Durand-Ruel on 21 January 1873 and exhibited at the First Impressionist Exhibition in April 1874 as number 162 It was later owned by François Depeaux before forming part of the Depeaux sale at the Georges Petit gallery in Paris on 31 May 1906. It was acquired by the Carlsberg Foundation in 1914 and later that year it was exhibited at the Statens Museum for Kunst before being acquired later the same year by its present owner, the Ny Carlsberg Glyptotek in Copenhagen.

== See also ==
- List of paintings by Alfred Sisley
