= The Church at Noisy-le-Roi, Autumn Effect =

1874 painting by Alfred Sisley

- The Bell-Tower at Noisy-le-Roi, Autumn Effect
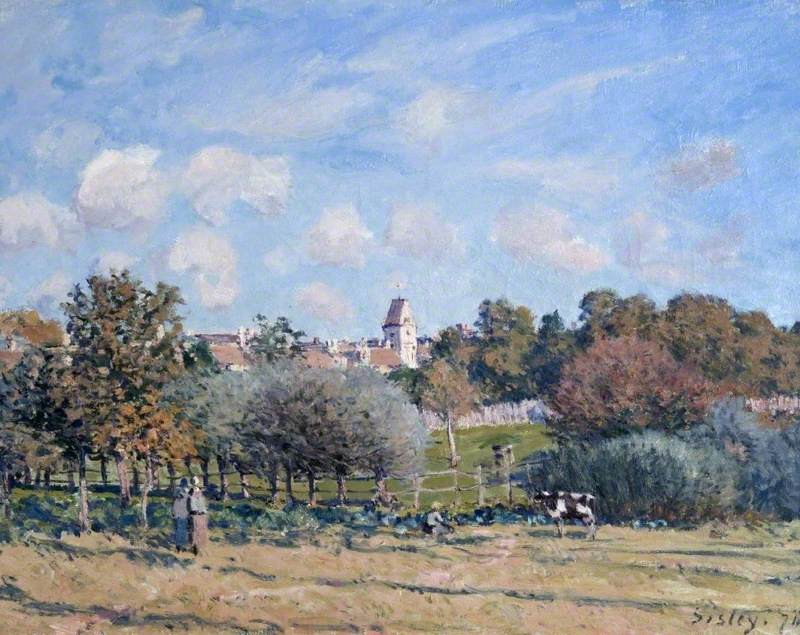
- Artist: Alfred Sisley
- Year: 1874
- Catalog: Alfred Sisley: catalogue raisonné de l'œuvre peint (1st edition) 134
- Movement: Impressionism
- Subject: The Church at Noisy-le-Roi
- Location: Burrell Collection, Glasgow

The Church at Noisy-le-Roi, Autumn Effect or The Bell-Tower at Noisy-le-Roi, Autumn Effect is an Impressionist painting by Alfred Sisley.

It was produced in autumn 1874 on the return from his stay in the United Kingdom the previous July to October, which had been paid for by his patron Jean-Baptiste Faure. The artist lived in Louveciennes from 1872 onwards and would move to Marly-le-Roi for good in winter 1874. It shows Noisy-le-Roi, a village between Versailles and Saint-Germain-en-Laye, to the southwest of Louveciennes and Marly-le-Roi, on the edge of the Marly forest.

Under the title Autumn Morning, it featured in a sale of works by Sisley, Monet, Renoir and Berthe Morisot at the Hôtel Drouot in Paris on 24 March 1875, appearing on page 14 of the sale catalogue. It was bought by Paul Durand-Ruel but refused by the Paris Salon of 1876. Next it was owned by A. Dachery of Paris and at a sale of his works at the Hôtel Drouot on 30 May 1899 it was bought for 8,500 francs by baron Henri de Rothschild. Its next purchaser was Sir William Burrell, who kept it in Lanark. It came to Glasgow in 1944 and is now displayed there as part of the Burrell Collection. Since the 1990s, a life-size reproduction has been displayed at the entrance to the village near the site of the original's creation as part of the Pays des Impressionnistes trail.

== See also ==
- List of paintings by Alfred Sisley
