= The Forge at Marly-le-Roi =

1875 painting by Alfred Sisley

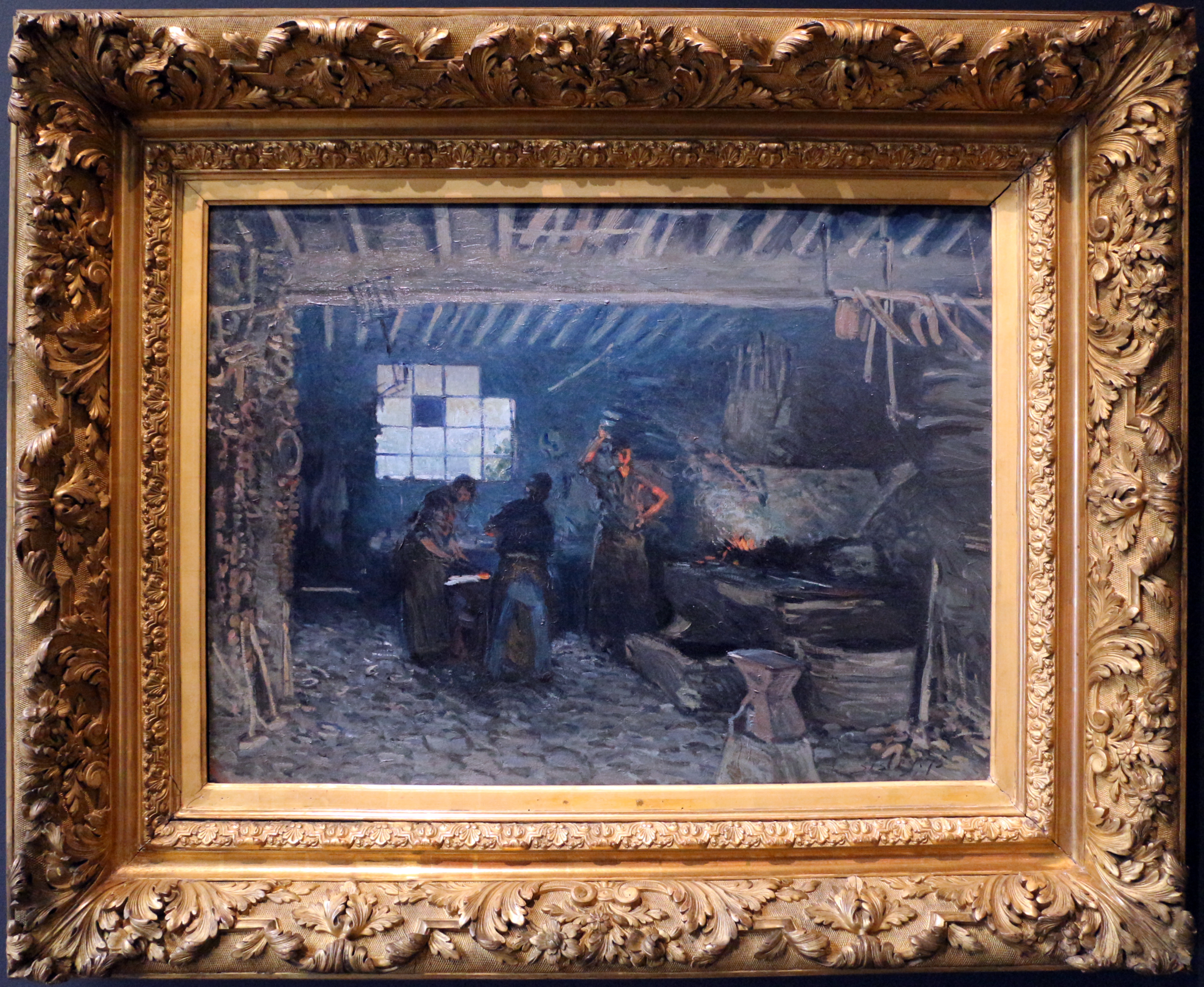
- Artist: Alfred Sisley
- Year: 1875
- Medium: Oil on canvas
- Dimensions: 55 cm × 73 cm (22 in × 29 in)
- Location: Musée d'Orsay, Paris

The Forge at Marly-le-Roi is an oil on canvas painting by British-born French artist Alfred Sisley, created in 1875. It was part of the François Depeaux collection until its sale in 1906 by the Galerie Georges Petit to Étienne Moreau-Nélaton. Moreau-Nélaton left it to the French state later in 1906 and it has been displayed at the Musée d'Orsay, in Paris, since 1986.

== Description ==
The painting was painted at the bottom of the Grande Rue de Marly-le-Roi, adjoining the Hôtel de Toulouse, at number 48, where there was a forge, nowadays transformed into a garage.

Sisley was mainly a landscape painter, like fellow Impressionist Claude Monet, so an intimate canvas by him dedicated to on human activities is rare. Among his around of 800 listed canvases, French Art historian Sylvie Patin counts only three interior views, The Lesson (1871), The Interior of a Farm in Moret (1880), and this one, which testifies the interest of the artist for simple people while living in Marly-le-Roi.

The lighting of the scene comes from the window, some panes of which are closed, and from the glowing forge. For the art historian Jean-Jacques Lévêque, "the treatment of chiaroscuro is exceptional in the work of an artist so lost in light, and so adept at capturing it".

== See also ==
- List of paintings by Alfred Sisley
