= List of paintings by Alfred Sisley =

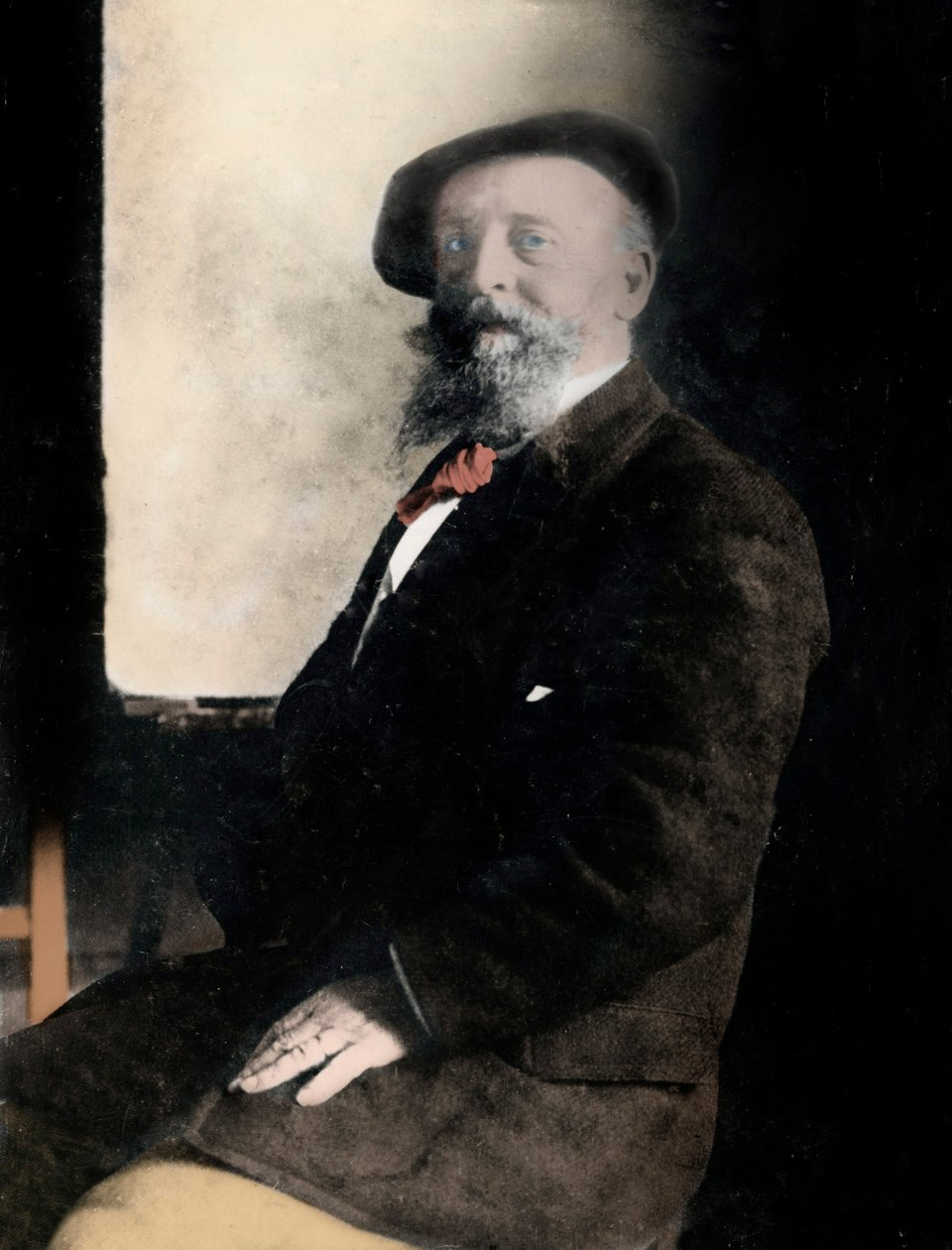
Alfred Sisley (1839–1899)

This is an incomplete list of the paintings by the British Impressionist artist Alfred Sisley, who was born to British parents in France, where he subsequently spent the majority of his life.

Timeline

- 1839 Born in Paris
- 1839–1870 Paris
- 1870–1875 Louveciennes, Yvelines (visit to England, 1874)
- 1875–1877 Marly-le-Roi, Yvelines
- 1877–1880 Sèvres, Hauts-de-Seine
- 1880–1882 Veneux-les-Sablons, Seine-et-Marne
- 1882–1899 Moret-sur-Loing, Seine-et-Marne (visit to Wales, 1897)
- 1899 Died in Moret-sur-Loing

== 1860s ==
Image	Name	Year	Dimensions (cm)	Current Location	Ref
	Fish on a Plate	1865–67	45.72 × 55.88	Virginia Museum of Fine Arts, Richmond	
	Avenue of Chestnut Trees at La Celle-Saint-Cloud	1865	129 x 208	Petit Palais, Paris	
	Avenue of Chestnut Trees at La Celle-Saint-Cloud	1865	50.5 x 65.5	Ordrupgaard	
	Village Street in Marlotte	1866	50 x 92	Albright-Knox Art Gallery, Buffalo	
	Avenue of Chestnut Trees near La Celle-Saint-Cloud	1867	95.5 x 122.2	Southampton Art Gallery	
	The Pheasant	1867	55 x 38	Private collection	
	View of Montmartre from Cité des Fleurs to Les Batignolles	1869	70 x 116	Museum of Grenoble	

== 1870s ==
Image	Name	Year	Dimensions (cm)	Current Location	Ref
	View of the Canal Saint-Martin	1870	50 x 65	Musée d'Orsay, Paris	
	Barges on the Canal Saint-Martin	1870	55 X 74	Oskar Reinhart Collection, Am Römerholz, Winterthur	
	Early Snow at Louveciennes	1871	54.9 x 73.7	Museum of Fine Arts, Boston	
	The Canal Saint-Martin	1872	38 x 46.5	Musée d'Orsay, Paris	
	L'île Saint-Denis	1872	50.5 x 65	Musée d'Orsay, Paris	
	Villeneuve-la-Garenne	1872	59 x 80.5	Hermitage Museum, St Petersburg, Russia	
	The Bridge at Villeneuve-la-Garenne	1872	49.5 x 65.4	Metropolitan Museum of Art, New York	
	Flood at Port Marly	1872	46.4 x 61	National Gallery of Art, Washington, D.C.	
	Ferry to the Ile-de-la-Loge – Flood	1872	45 x 60	Ny Carlsberg Glyptotek, Copenhagen	
	Drying Nets	1872	42 x 65	Kimbell Art Museum, Fort Worth	
	The Kitchen Garden	1872	50.2 x 65.7	Kimbell Art Museum, Fort Worth	
	The Grand-Rue in Argenteuil	1872	65 x 46	Norwich Castle	
	Place d'Argenteuil	1872	45 x 65	Musée d'Orsay, Paris	
	Boulevard Héloïse, Argenteuil	1872	39.5 x 59.6	National Gallery of Art, Washington, D.C.	
	The Seine at Argenteuil	1872	50 x 73	Richard Bernhard Foundation	
	The Seine at Argenteuil	1872	46 x 65	Private collection	
	The Seine at Argenteuil	1872	50 x 60.5	Faure Museum (Aix-les-Bains)	
	Footbridge at Argenteuil	1872	39 x 60	Musée d'Orsay, Paris	
	A corner of Louveciennes	1872	46 x 40	Private collection	
	Village at the edge of the wood	1872	50 x 65	Private collection	
	Sentier de la mi-cote, Louveciennes	1872	38 x 46.5	Musée d'Orsay, Paris	
	Watering Places at Marly	1873	98.1 x 130.5	Pola Museum of Art	
	Landscape (Spring at Bougival)	c. 1873	40.6 x 57.2	Philadelphia Museum of Art	
	The Flood. Banks of the Seine, Bougival	1873	50 x 65.5	Ordrupgaard	
	Frost in Louveciennes	1873	46 x 61	Pushkin Museum, Moscow	
	A Turn in the Road	1873	54.5 x 64.7	Art Institute of Chicago	
	l'île de la Grande Jatte	1873	50.5 x 65.0	Musée d'Orsay, Paris	
	Boats at the Lock in Bougival	1873	46 x 65	Musée d'Orsay, Paris	
	Chemin de la Machine, Louveciennes	1873	54.5 x 73	Musée d'Orsay, Paris	
	Molesey Weir, Hampton Court	1874	51.1 x 68.8	Scottish National Gallery, Edinburgh	
	Regatta at Hampton Court	1874	46 x 61	Foundation E.G. Bührle, Zürich	
	Thames at Hampton Court	1874	38 x 55.4	Clark Art Institute, Williamstown	
	The Thames at Hampton Court	1874	66.4 x 91.8	Museo Nacional de Bellas Artes (Buenos Aires)	
	Road from Hampton Court	1874	38 x 55		
	The Road to Hampton Court	1874	38.8 x 55.8	Neue Pinakothek, Munich	
La Tamise avec Hampton Church (1874)	The Thames with Hampton Church	1874	50.5 x 68.5	Private collection	
	Regatta at Molesey	1874	66 x 91.5	Musée d'Orsay, Paris	
	An Inn at Hampton Court	1874	51 x 69	Private collection	
	Bridge at Hampton Court	1874	46 x 61	Wallraf-Richartz Museum, Cologne	
	Under Hampton Court Bridge	1874	50 x 76	Kunstmuseum Winterthur	
	View of the Thames: Charing Cross Bridge	1874	33 x 46	National Gallery, London	
	The Fields	1874	46 x 61	Leeds Art Gallery	
	The Church at Noisy-le-Roi, Autumn Effect	1874	45.7 x 61	Burrell Collection, Glasgow	
	The Lesson	1874	41.3 x 47	Private collection	
	The Village of Voisins	1874	38 x 46.5	Musée d'Orsay, Paris	
	The Farm at Trou d'Enfer, Autumn Morning	1874	45.8 x 60.5	High Museum of Art	
	The Road to Louveciennes	1874	38.73 × 55.88	Carnegie Museum of Art, Pittsburg	
	The Route to Mantes	1874	38 x 55.5	Musée du Louvre, Paris	
	The Road from Mantes to Choisy le Roi	1874		Private collection	
	The Road from Prunay to Bougival	1874		Private Collection	
	Fog, Voisins	1874	50.5 x 65	Musée d'Orsay, Paris	
	Village Street Grey Weather	1874	38 x 55		
	Village Street Louveciennes	1874	42 x 50	Aberdeen Art Gallery	
	A Normandy Farm	c. 1874	49.6 x 59.8	Manchester Art Gallery	
	The Aqueduct at Marly	1874	54.3 x 81.3	Toledo Museum of Art	
	Snow at Louveciennes	c. 1874	46.3 x 55.8	Courtauld Institute of Art, London	
	Snow at Louveciennes	1874	55.88 x 45.72	Phillips Memorial Gallery, Washington, DC	
	Snow on the Road, Louveciennes	1874	38 x 46	Private collection	
	Road to Louveciennes	1874	65 x 54	Private collection	
	The Effect of Snow at Argenteuil	1874		Private collection	
	The Road to Saint Germain, near Marly	1875	46 x 55	Foundation E.G. Bührle, Zürich	
	A Road in Seine and Marne	1875	46 x 61		
	The Terrace at Saint Germain, Spring	1875	73.66 x 99.06	Walters Art Museum, Baltimore	
	Fete Day at Marly le Roi (14 July at Marly, France)	1875	52.5 x 72.3	Higgins Art Gallery, Bedford	
	The Versailles Road	1875	47 x 38	Musée d'Orsay, Paris	
	The Road to Montbuisson at Louveciennes	1875	46 x 61	Musée de l'Orangerie, Paris	
	Banks of the Seine at Port Marly	1875	54.6 x 65	Private collection	
	Marly-le-Roi	1875	38.1 × 56.2	National Gallery of Art, Washington, D.C.	
	The Watering Place at Marly le Roi in Winter	1875	49.5 x 65.4	National Gallery, London	
	Bassin de Marly	1875	46 x 61	Kunsthaus Zürich	
	Watering Place at Marly	1875	39.5 × 56.2	Art Institute of Chicago	
	Horses being Watered at Marly le Roi	1875	38 x 61	Foundation E.G. Bührle, Zürich	
	Wild Flowers (Bouquet de fleurs)	c. 1875	65.41 × 50.48	Virginia Museum of Fine Arts, Richmond (private collection)	
	Cow Pasture near Louveciennes	1875			
	The Forge at Marly-le-Roi	1875	54 x 73	Musée d'Orsay, Paris	
	Landscape at Andresy	1875			
	The Meadow	1875	54.9 x 73	National Gallery of Art, Washington, D.C.	
	Landscape along the Seine with the Institut de France and the Pont des Arts	c.1875	53.3 × 62.2	Art Institute of Chicago	
	Rider at the Edge of the Forest	1875			
	The Road from Versailles to Saint-Germain	1875	51.1 x 65.1	J. Paul Getty Museum, Los Angeles	
	Valley of the Seine at Saint-Cloud	1875	65 x 92	Musée des Beaux-Arts de Rennes	
	Sand on the Quayside, Port Marly	1875	46 x 65	Private collection	
	Washerwomen at Bougival	1875	46 x 61	Kunsthaus Zürich	
	Snow at Marly le Roi	1875	38 x 55	Frye Art Museum	
	The Blocked Seine at Port Marly	1876		Private collection	
	The Rising Path	1875	65 x 50	Private collection	
	The Seine at Port-Marly, Piles of Sand	1875	54 x 65.7	Art Institute of Chicago	
	The Hillsides at Bougival	1875	50.2 x 59.7	National Gallery of Canada, Ottawa	
	Les scieurs de long	1875	51 x 65.5	Petit Palais, Paris	
	Autumn Landscape, Louveciennnes	1875	50.2 x 65.1	Private collection	
	Vue de Marly-le-Roi, effet de soleil	1876	54.2 x 73.2	Art Gallery of Ontario, Toronto	
	Grapes And Walnuts	1876	38 x 55.4	Museum of Fine Arts, Boston	
	A Path in Louveciennes	1876	49.2 x 65.1	Private collection	
	The Marly Machine and the Dam	1876	38 x 45	Private collection	
	The First Hoarfrost, First White Frost	1876	46 x 55	Private collection	
	The Watering Trough at Marly with Hoarfrost	1876	37.78 x 54.93	Virginia Museum of Fine Arts, Richmond	
	The Flood at Port Marly	1876	50 x 61	Thyssen-Bornemisza Museum, Madrid	
	Flooding at Port-Marly	1876	50 x 61	Musée des Beaux-Arts de Rouen	
	A Street in Marly	1876	50 x 65	Kunsthalle Mannheim	
	Street Scene in Marly	1876	46 x 65.4	Private collection	
	Place du Chenil in Marly, Snow Effect	1876	50 x 61.5	Musée des Beaux-Arts de Rouen	
	Snow at Marly Le Roi	1876	46 x 55	Musée d'Orsay, Paris	
	Flood at Port Marly	1876	50.4 x 61	Musée d'Orsay, Paris	
	Flood at Port Marly	1876			
	The Flood on the Road to Saint Germain	1876	46 x 61	Museum of Fine Arts, Houston	
	The Laundry	1876	38 x 55	Worcester Art Museum, Worcester, Massachusetts	
	Women Laundering	1876	54 x 73		
	The Seine at Bougival	1876	50 x 61		
	The Seine at Marly	1876	60 x 73	Musée des Beaux-Arts de Lyon	
	The Seine at Bougival	1876	45 x 61	Metropolitan Museum of Art, New York	
	Sunset at Port Marly	1876	50.17 x 65.41	Private collection	
	View of Marly-le-Roi from Coeur-Volant	1876	65.4 x 92.4	Metropolitan Museum of Art, New York	
	Waterworks at Marly	c.1876	46.5 x 61.8	Museum of Fine Arts, Boston	
	Hill Path	1876	38 x 55	Musée des Beaux-Arts de Lyon	
	Summer at Bourgival	1876	47 x 62	Foundation E.G. Bührle, Zürich	
	Banks of the Seine at Bougival	1876	38 x 55	Private collection	
	Bougival	1876	60 x 73	Cincinnati Art Museum	
	Boats on the Seine	1875–79	37.2 x 44.3	Courtauld Institute of Art, London	
	Near Louveciennes	1876	41 x 46	Wallraf-Richartz Museum, Cologne	
	The Banks of the Seine in Autumn	1876	46.5 x 65.4	Städel, Frankfurt	
	Path in the Country	1876	41 x 70		
	The Seine at Billancourt	1877	45.7 x 54.9	Philadelphia Museum of Art	
	Snow Effect at Louveciennes	c. 1877	50 x 61.5	Museo Nacional de Bellas Artes (Buenos Aires)	
	Road under Snow, Louveciennes	c. 1876	46 x 55	Private collection	
	Under Snow – a Farmyard at Marly-le-Roi	1876	38.5 x 55.7	Musée d'Orsay, Paris	
	Unloading Barges at Billancourt	1877	50 x 65	Ordrupgaard	
	The Bridge at Sèvres	c. 1877	38.1 x 46	National Gallery, London	
	Sevres Bridge	1877	38 x 46		
	The Bridge of Sevres	1877	38 x 46	Private collection	
	The Sevres Bridge	1877	38 x 55		
	The Sevres Bridge	1877	50 x 65		
	The Park at Sevres	1877			
	The Seine at Suresnes	1877	60 x 73		
	Barges at Billancourt	1877	46.5 x 56.3	Hermitage Museum, Saint Petersburg	
	Rowers	1877			
	Saint-Cloud	1877	50 x 65	Musée du Louvre, Paris	
	The Seine at Saint-Cloud	1877	38 x 55		
	The Bridge at Saint-Cloud	1877		Private collection	
	Sunset at Moret	1877			
	A Street in Louveciennes	1878	55 x 46	Musée d'Orsay, Paris	
	Bougival	1878		Private collection	
	Dawn	1878	54.5 x 65.5		
	Landscape at Sevres	1878	92 x 73	Private collection	
	The Snow at Louveciennes	1878	61 x 50	Musée d'Orsay, Paris	
	Allée of Chestnut Trees	1878	50.2 x 61	Metropolitan Museum of Art, New York	
	Promenade of Chestnut Trees	1878	51.75 x 62.55	Private collection	
	Seine at Daybreak	1878	38 x 46		
	The Seine at Grenelle	1878	27 x 41		
	The Seine at Grenelle, Rainy Weather	1878	50 x 61		
	The Seine at Point du Jour	1878	38 x 56	Private collection	
	The Seine, View from the Quay de Pont du Jour	1878	54 x 65		
	The Banks of the Oise	1878	54.3 x 64.7	National Gallery of Art, Washington, D.C.	
	First Snow at Veneux-Nadon	1878	49.2 x 65.2	National Gallery of Art, Washington, D.C.	
	Resting by a Stream at the Edge of the Wood	1878	73.5 x 80.5	Musée d'Orsay, Paris	
	Overpass at Sevres	1879	37.9 x 55.5	Pola Museum of Art	
	Mooring Lines, the Effect of Snow at Saint-Cloud	1879	37.5 x 45.7	Philadelphia Museum of Art	
	The Road from Versailles to Louveciennes	1879	45.7 x 55.9	Metropolitan Museum of Art, New York	
	The Road in the Woods	1879	54.9 x 73	National Gallery of Art, Washington, D.C.	
	An Autumn Evening near Paris	1879	50.1 x 65.4	Private collection	
	Banks of the Seine	1879	38 x 46		
	Children Playing in the Fields	1879			
	Flood at Moret	1879	54 x 71.8	Brooklyn Museum, New York City	
	Flooded Field	1879	49.5 x 73	Private collection	
	High Waters at Moret sur Loing	1879	22 x 29		
	The Seine near Suresnes	1879	50 x 65	Private collection	
	View of Sevres	1879	46 x 38	Private collection	
	Path near Sevres	1879		Private collection	
	Railroad Embankment at Sevres	1879		Museo Botero, Bogotá	
	Railroad Embankment at Sevres	1879		Private collection	
	Station at Sevres	c.1879	38.1 x 55.88	Private collection	
	The Station at Sevres	1879		Private collection	
	Footbridge over the Railroad at Sevres	1879	38 x 55.7		
	Saint-Cloud, Banks of the Seine	1879	38 x 46	Private collection	
	The Seine near Saint-Cloud, High Water	1879	38 x 55		
	The Factory at Sevres	1879	60.01 x 73.34		
	The Hill Path, Ville d'Avray	1879	50 x 65	Private collection	
	The Road in the Woods	1879	46 x 65		

== 1880s ==
Image	Name	Year	Dimensions (cm)	Current Location	Ref
	Spring at Veneux	1880	73 x 92	Private collection	
	View of Saint Mammés	c.1880	54.61 × 73.98	Walters Art Museum, Baltimore	
	Old Houses at Saint-Mammès	1880	50 x 65	Private collection	
	The Path to the Old Ferry at By	1880	49.8 x 65.1	National Gallery, London	
	The Seine at Suresnes	1880	65.3 x 46.4	Scottish National Gallery, Edinburgh	
	Apple Trees in Bloom (imitation after Alfred Sisley)	1880	65 x 81	National Gallery of Canada, Ottawa	
	The Small Meadows in Spring	1880–81	54.3 x 73	National Gallery, London	
	Street Entering the Village	1880	33 x 46	Private collection	
	Banks of the Loing, Autumn	1880	92 x 65	Private collection	
	Bateau de Charge sur le Loing	1880		Private collection	
	Bend in the River Loing in Summer	1880			
	Le Givre à Veneux	1880	79.5 x 103	University of Michigan Museum of Art	
	Banks of the Seine at By	1880–81	54.3 x 73.3	Clark Art Institute, Williamstown	
	Apples and Grapes in a Basket	1880–81	46 x 61	Clark Art Institute, Williamstown	
	Effet de Neige (Snow Effect)	1880–85	45.7 x 54.6	Scottish National Gallery, Edinburgh	
	Windy Afternoon in May	c.1880			
	Chestnut Tree at Saint Mammès	1880	49.8 x 65.7		
	Construction Site at Saint Mammès	1880	65 x 92	Private collection	
	Construction Site at Saint Mammès	1880	50 x 65		
	Overcast Day at Saint Mammès	c.1880	54.9 x 74.0	Museum of Fine Arts, Boston	
	Sunrise at Saint Mammès	1880	49.5 x 65.1	Private collection	
	Le Bois des Roches Veneux Nadon	1880	73 x 55	Musée du Louvre, Paris	
	The Roches Courtaut Wood, near By	1880	50 x 65		
	View of Moret	1880	38 x 55	Private collection	
	The Path from Veneux to Thomery along the Water, Evening	1880	50 x 65		
	Walnut Tree in a Thomery Field	1880	57 x 71	Private collection	
	Wiese, By	1880	71.5 x 80		
	Riverbank at Saint Mammès	1880	50 x 65	Private collection	
	Road Along the Seine at Saint Mammes	1880	74 x 54	Dallas Museum of Art	
	The Seine at Suresnes	1880			
	The Forest at Boulogne	c.1880			
	Snowy Weather at Veneux-Nadon	c.1880	55 x 74.5	Musée d'Orsay, Paris	
	The Bridge at Saint-Mammès	1881	54.6 x 73.2	Philadelphia Museum of Art	
	The By Road at the Roches-Courtaut Woods – Indian Summer	1881	59.2 x 81	Montreal Museum of Fine Arts	
	The Plain at Veneux-Nadon	1881	50.5 x 65.3	Montreal Museum of Fine Arts	
	A February Morning at Moret sur Loing	1881	50 x 65	Private collection	
	Orchard in Spring	1881	54 x 72	Museum Boijmans van Beuningen, Rotterdam	
	Saint-Mammès: Morning	1881	50.2 x 73.7	Museum of Fine Arts, Boston	
	The Loing at Saint-Mammès	1881	49.8 x 64.9	Museum of Fine Arts, Boston	
	By the River	1881	54 x 73		
	The Small Meadow at By	1881	60 x 73	Accademia Carrara, Bergamo	
	Footpath in the Gardens at By	1881	50 x 73	Private collection	
	Summer in Moret	1881			
	The Loing at Moret	1881	38 x 54	Private collection	
	Landscape The Banks of the Loing at Saint Mammes	1881		Private collection	
	Near Moret-sur-Loing	1881	54.61 x 73.34	Private collection	
	The Garden of the Hoschedé Family, Montgeron	1881	54 x 73	Pushkin Museum, Moscow	
	An August Afternoon near Veneux	1881	54 x 73	Private collector	
	En Canoe at Veneux, September Afternoon	1881	46 x 55	Private collection	
	November Afternoon	1881			
	Riverbank at Veneux	1881	60 x 81	Johannesburg Art Gallery	
	The Fields and Hills of Veneux Nadon	1881		Private collection	
	View of Saint-Mammès	1881	54 x 73.7	Carnegie Museum of Art, Pittsburgh	
	Winter Morning, Veneux	1881	50 x 81		
	The Bourgogne Lock at Moret, Spring	1882	54.5 x 73.5	National Gallery Prague	
	Washerwomen, near Champagne	1882	48.9 x 72.4	National Gallery of Canada, Ottawa	
	The Plain of Thomery and the Village of Champagne	1882	54 x 73	Private collection	
	Canal du Loing Chemin de Halage	1882	127 x 186.69	Private collection	
	Near the Bank of the Seine at By	1882	54 x 73	Private collection	
	On the Road from Moret	1882	54 x 73	Private collection	
	Walnut Trees, Sunset Early Days of October	1882	73 x 92		
	Windy Day at Veneux	1882	60 x 81	Hermitage Museum, St Petersburg	
	Between Veneux and By December Morning	1882	54 x 73		
	Willows on the Banks of Orvanne	1883	54.3 x 73.7	Kunsthaus Zürich	
	A Corner of the Wood in Sablons	1883	60.5 x 73.5	Musée d'Orsay, Paris	
	The Road from Moret to Saint-Mammès	1883–85	50.5 x 61.5	Metropolitan Museum of Art, New York	
	Banks of the Loing towards Moret	1883	50 x 73		
	Bridge over the Orvanne near Moret	1883		Private collection	
	On the Banks of the Loing Canal	1883	54 x 64.5	Private collection	
	Provencher's Mill at Moret	1883	54 x 73	Museum Boijmans van Beuningen, Rotterdam	
	Street in Veneux	1883	54 x 73		
	The Loing at Moret	1883	50.8 x 65.72	Private collection	
	Tugboat on the Loing at Saint-Mammès	1883	54.5 x 73.5	Petit Palais, Paris	
	Matratat's Boatyard, Moret sur Loing	1883	38 x 55		
	Path at Sablons	c.1883	46 x 55	National Gallery of Australia, Canberra	
	Landscape near Moret	1884	54.5 x 73.5	Private collection	
	Haystack	1884	38.1 x 55.88	Private collection	
	Morning in June (Saint Mammes et les Coteaux de la Celle)	1884	54 x 73		
	Saint Mammès-Morning	1884	63.5 x 87.6	Los Angeles County Museum of Art	
	River Banks at Saint-Mammès	1884	50 x 65	Hermitage Museum, St Petersburg	
	Barges on the Loing, Saint Mammès	1884		Private collection	
	Farmyard at Saint-Mammès	1884	73 x 92	Musée d'Orsay, Paris	
	A Corner of the Roches Courtaut Woods, June	1884	73 x 60		
	Saint-Mammès, temps gris	1884	45.7 x 54.6	Art Gallery of Ontario, Toronto	
	La Croix-Blanche at Saint-Mammès	1884	65.4 x 92.4	Museum of Fine Arts, Boston	
	September Morning near Saint-Mammès and the Veneux-Nadon Hills	1884	54 x 72.5	Ordrupgaard	
	Canal du Loing	1884	38.5 x 55	Musée d'Orsay, Paris	
	The Loing River at Saint-Mammes	1885	38.7 x 55.6	Pola Museum of Art	
	Banks of the Loing River	1885	55.1 x 73.3	Philadelphia Museum of Art	
	The Canal at Saint-Mammès	1885	55.2 x 73.7	Philadelphia Museum of Art	
	La Route	1885	65 x 92	Kunsthaus Zürich	
	Moret – The Shores of the Loing	1885	52 x 74	Albertina	
	The River Boat Garage	1885	46 x 56	Ordrupgaard	
	Une Cour aux Sablons	1885	55 x 73.3	Aberdeen Art Gallery	
	The Edge of Fontainebleau Forest	1885	60 х 73	Pushkin Museum, Moscow	
	Barges at Saint Mammès (Saint-Mammès during the strike of 14th July)	c. 1885	38 x 55	Foundation E.G. Bührle, Zürich	
	The Loing at Saint-Mammés	1885	55 x 73.2	Museum of modern art André Malraux - MuMa	
	Saint-Mammès, Loing Canal	1885	46.6 x 55.8	Cleveland Art Museum	
	Moret at Sunset	1888	73.7 x 92.1	Cincinnati Art Museum	
	Evening in Moret, End of October	1888	54 x 73	Thyssen-Bornemisza Museum, Madrid	
	Le Pont de Moret	1888	64.8 x 92	Minneapolis Institute of Art	

== 1890s ==
Image	Name	Year	Dimensions (cm)	Current Location	Ref
	A Street in Moret	1890	60 × 73.2	Art Institute of Chicago	
	Avenue of Poplars near Moret-sur-Loing	1890	65 x 81	Musée d'Orsay, Paris	
	Banks of the Loing River, Morning	1891	59.6 x 57.4	Pola Museum of Art	
	Bridge at Moret-sur-Loing	1891	59.7 x 72.4	Philadelphia Museum of Art	
	Le pont de Moret - effet du matin	1891	54.5 x 73.2	Private collection	
	The Loing and the Mills of Moret, Snow Effect	1891	58.7 x 81.6	Clark Art Institute, Williamstown	
	St. Martin's Summers, near Moret-sur-Loing	1891	73 x 60	Musée Marmottan, Paris	
	The Canal du Loing in Winter	1891		National Museum of Fine Arts of Algiers	
	Rue Eugène Moussoir at Moret: Winter	1891	46.7 x 56.5	Metropolitan Museum of Art, New York	
	Moret-sur-Loing (Rue des Fossés)	1892	38.5 x 46.9	National Museum Cardiff	
	Le Canal du Loing	1892	73.5 x 92.5	Musée d'Orsay, Paris	
	A Bend in the Loing	1892	66 x 92.5	Museu Nacional d'Art de Catalunya, Barcelona	
	Uphill Road in Sunshine	1893		Musée des Beaux-Arts de Rouen	
	The Bridge at Moret	1892	73.5 x 92	Musée d'Orsay, Paris	
	The Small Meadows at By, Stormy Weather	1892		Musée d'art et d'histoire de Meudon	
	The Church at Moret in the Morning Sun	1893	65 x 81	Musée des Beaux-Arts de Rouen	
	The Church at Moret in Morning Sun	1893	81 x 65	Kunstmuseum Winterthur	
	Moret Church, Afternoon	c.1893			
	The Church of Moret-sur-Loing: Rainy Morning Weather	1893	81.3 x 65.9	Hunterian Art Gallery, University of Glasgow	
	The Church in Moret, Evening	1893	83 x 64	Private collection	
	The Church at Moret (Evening)	1894	101 x 82	Petit Palais, Paris	
	Church at Moret after the Rain	1894	73 x 60.5	Detroit Institute of Arts	
	The Church at Moret, Winter	1893–94	81.3 x 54.3	Budapest Museum of Fine Arts	
	The Church at Moret	c.1893	55 x 46	Calvet Museum, Avignon	
	Sahurs Meadows in Morning Sun	1894	73 x 92.1	Metropolitan Museum of Art, New York	
	A Corner of Moret-sur-Loing	1895	33.7 × 42.6	Art Institute of Chicago	
	A Forest Clearing	1895	56.4 x 65.4	Thyssen-Bornemisza Museum, Madrid	
	Barges From Berry on the Loing Canal in Spring	1896	54 x 65	Ordrupgaard	
	Banks of the Loing	1896		Private collection	
	Banks of the Loing	1896	46.3 × 55.3	Art Institute of Chicago	
	By the River Loing	1896		Musée des Beaux-Arts de Rouen	
	Cabins by the River Loing, Morning	1896	60 x 73		
	Cabins along the Loing Canal, Sunlight Effect	1896		Private collection	
	Les Bords du Loing	1897	54.5 x 65.5	Aberdeen Art Gallery	
	Bords de Riviere or Les Oies	1897	21.2 x 32	Brooklyn Museum, New York; Cleveland Museum of Art	
	A Cardiff Shipping Lane	1897	54 x 65	Musée des Beaux-Arts de Reims	
	Bristol Channel from Penarth, Evening	1897		Allen Memorial Art Museum, Oberlin	
	The Cliff at Penarth, Evening, Low Tide	1897	54.4 x 65.7	National Museum Cardiff	
	High Wind	1897	55 x 66.5	Museu Nacional de Belas Artes	
	Langland Bay	1897	54 x 65	Wallraf-Richartz Museum, Cologne	
	Langland Bay	1897			
	Lady's Cove, Wales	1897		Musée des Beaux-Arts de Rouen	
	Lady's Cove	1897			
	Lady's Cove, Langland Bay, Morning	1897	65.7 x 81.3		
	Lady's Cove before the Storm	1897	65 x 81		
	Langland Bay, Storr Rock, Morning	1897	65 x 81	Kunstmuseum Bern	
	Storr Rock, Lady's Cove, Le Soir	1897	65.5 x 81.5	National Museum Cardiff	
