= The Grand-Rue in Argenteuil =

1872 painting by Alfred Sisley

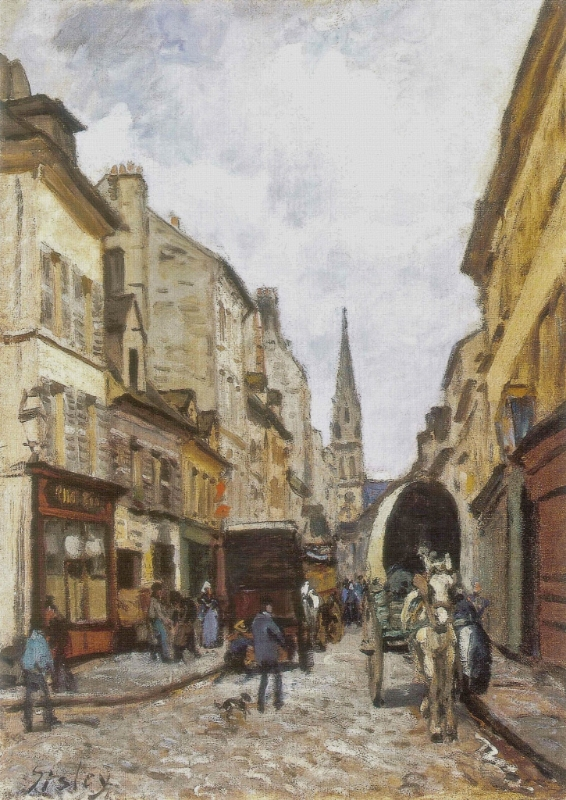
- Artist: Alfred Sisley
- Year: 1872
- Medium: oil on canvas
- Dimensions: 65 cm × 46 cm (26 in × 18 in)
- Location: Norwich Castle, Norfolk, England

The Grand-Rue in Argenteuil is an 1872 painting by Alfred Sisley, previously entitled A Street in Sèvres. It is now in Norwich Castle.

Arts journalist Véronique Prat sees the work's perspective, with the tower of Saint-Denys Basilica in a cloudy sky, as influenced by Hokusai.

== Provenance ==
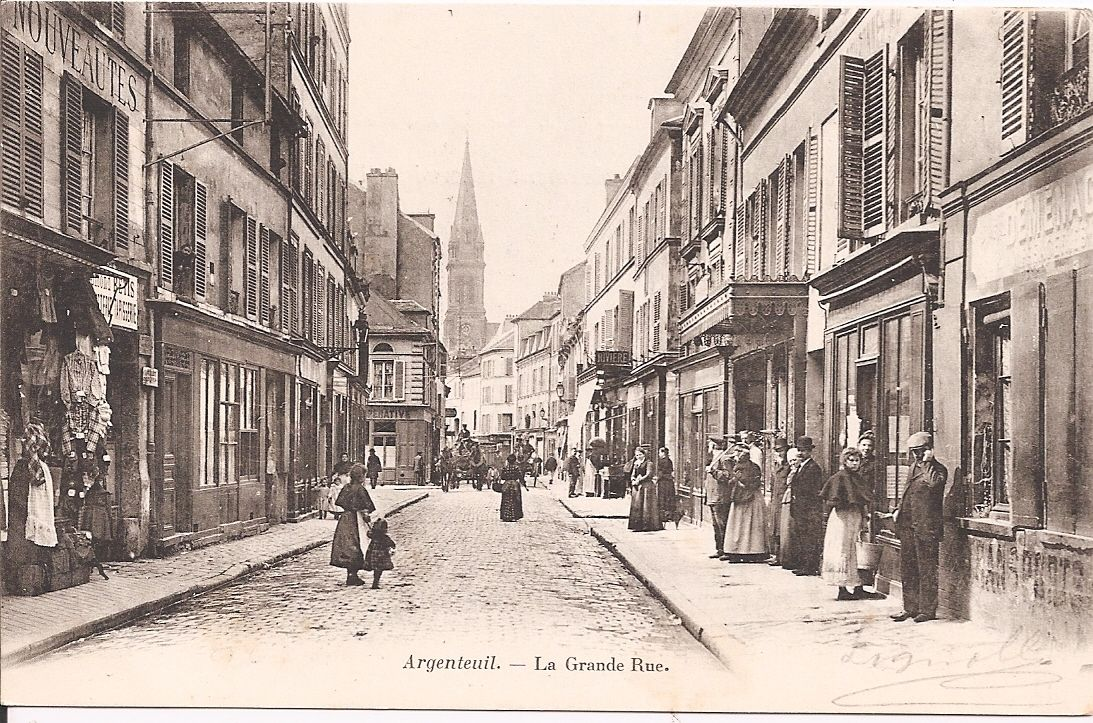
Argenteuil - The Grande Rue c.1900

The work is first recorded in the Parisian galleries of Georges Petit and Bernheim-Jeune, before being sold from the Dognin collection on 15 October 1928 to Durand-Ruel, who sold it three days later to Morot. It later passed to Dora Fulford, who in 1945 left it to the National Art Collections Fund, which allocated it to its present owner later that year.

== See also ==
- List of paintings by Alfred Sisley
