= The Terrace at Saint-Germain, Spring (painting) =

1875 painting by Alfred Sisley

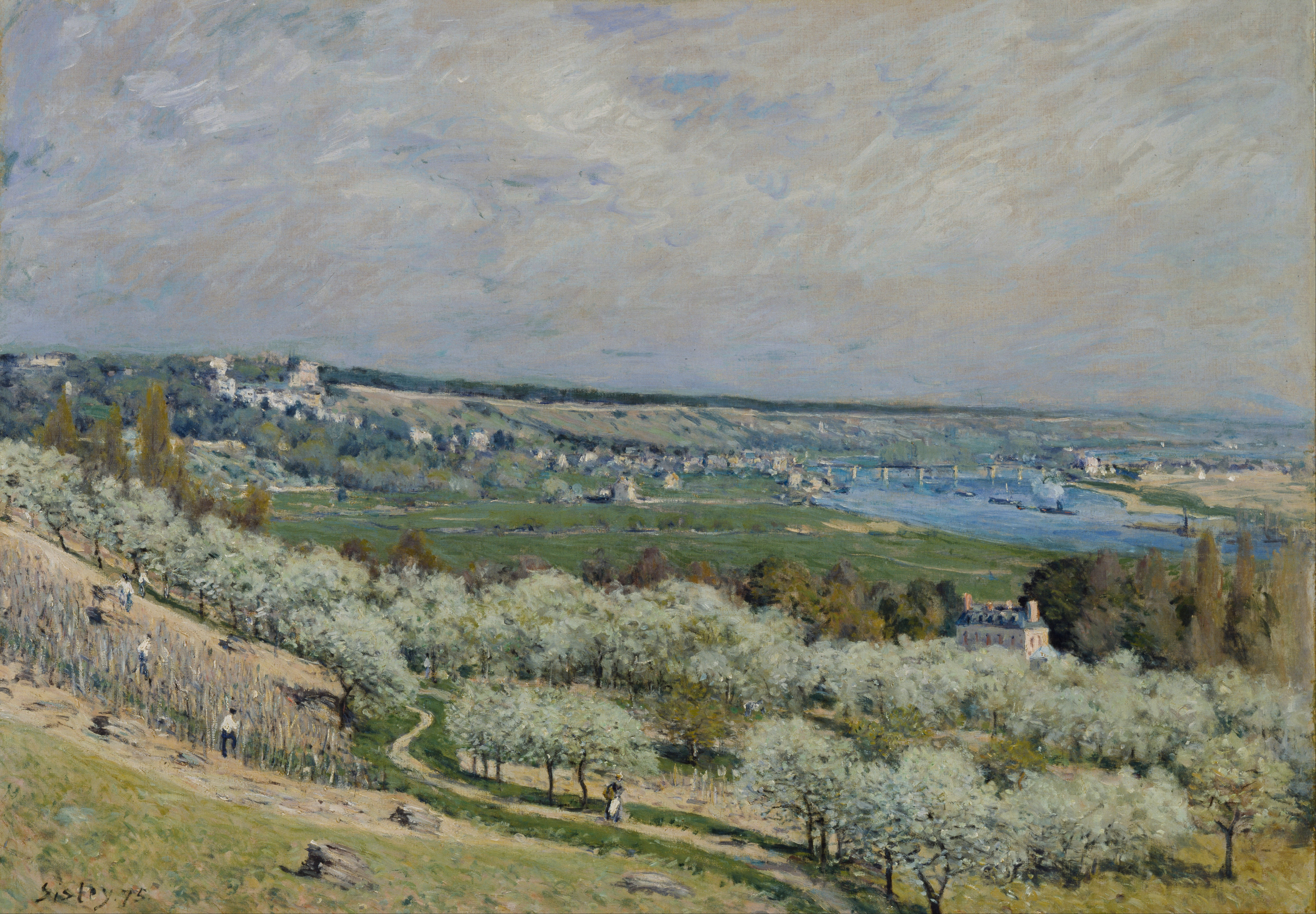
- Artist: Alfred Sisley
- Year: 1875
- Medium: Oil on canvas
- Dimensions: 73.6 cm × 99.6 cm (29.0 in × 39.2 in)
- Location: The Walters Art Museum; Baltimore

The Terrace at Saint-Germain, Spring is a painting by English Impressionist painter Alfred Sisley, completed in 1875. It is in The Walters Art Museum collection.

== History ==
Alfred Sisley can be distinguished from other Impressionists by his commitment to landscape painting. In 1872, he moved his family to Louveciennes, where he painted the nearby view of the Seine Valley at St.-Germain-en-Laye. Over the course of his career he painted nearly 900 oil paintings, which were mainly landscapes spanning from the forest of Fontainebleau and Louveciennes, London to Moret and Wales. He would often focus on the serenity of pastoral settings.

== Composition ==
The Terrace at Saint-Germain, Spring represents a panoramic view of the Seine Valley and captures the light associated with Springtime. The painting portrays a seemingly limitless area of countryside. The river is shown winding away from Paris, in the foreground, laborers work in a vineyard and a lone female walks through the orchard. In the distance, there is a chateau, which housed the royal court until 1682. Modern aspects of the painting include the steam-powered tugboats pulling barges and the railroad bridge.

== Off the Wall ==
Until 31 December 2013, a reproduction of The Terrace at Saint-Germain, Spring was on display at Robert E. Lee Park as part of Off the Wall, an open-air exhibition on the streets of Baltimore, Maryland. The National Gallery in London began the concept of bringing art out of doors in 2007, and the Detroit Institute of Art introduced the concept in the U.S. The Off the Wall reproductions of the Walters' paintings are done on weather-resistant vinyl and include a description of the painting and a QR code for smart phones.

== See also ==
- List of paintings by Alfred Sisley
