= The Meadow (painting) =

1875 painting by Alfred Sisley

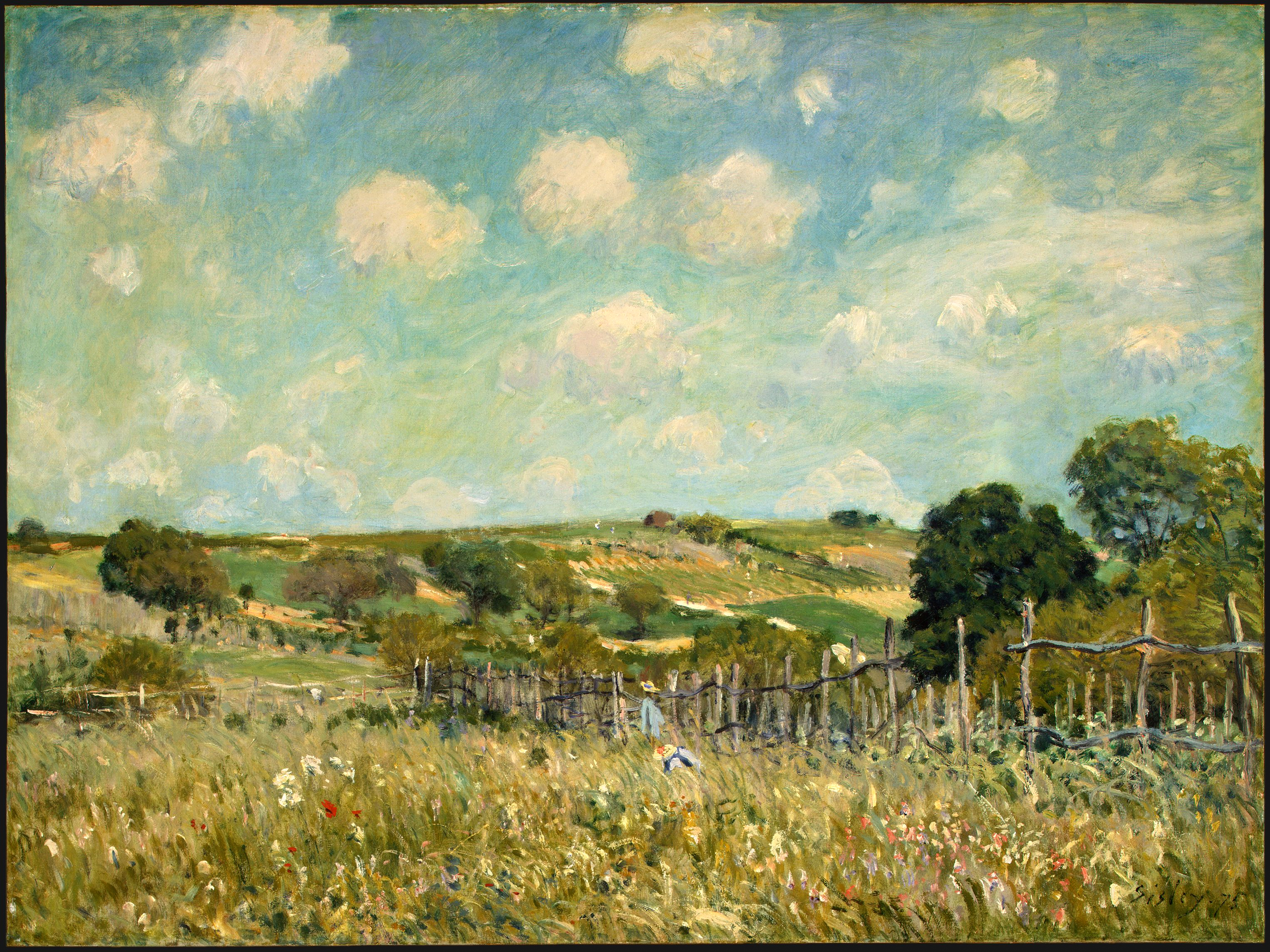
- Artist: Alfred Sisley
- Year: 1875
- Medium: Oil on canvas
- Dimensions: 54.9 cm × 73 cm (21.6 in × 29 in)
- Location: National Gallery of Art, Washington, D.C.

The Meadow is an 1875 painting by Alfred Sisley, now in section 88 (French Impressionist landscapes) in the National Gallery of Art in Washington DC. It shows a scene near Louveciennes - Pierre-Auguste Renoir painted the same view of Louveciennes that year as Path Through Tall Herbs.

It is described in the catalogue of count Armand Doria's collection as:

The meadow, where herbs grow, is enamelled in flowers, daisies, poppies, blueberries. Two little girls in blue aprons and straw hats with red and blue ribbons gather there. To the right, a wooden fence, behind which a few clumps of trees raise their blonde foliage. And further away, countryside as far as the horizon, whose crops climb the flanks of the hills, under a blue sky, edged with white clouds.

It was sold from Doria's collection at the Georges Petit gallery on 4–5 May 1899 as catalogue number 224. It was bought by Durand-Ruel, before being sold again in 1900 via Bernheim-Jeune to Jules Strauss (1861–1943).

It was sold from Strauss' collection as catalogue number 60 on 3 May 1902 to Joubert, possibly on behalf of the Georges Petit gallery. In 1933 it was acquired by senator Antonio Santamarina of Buenos Aires in 1933. In 1957 it was sold to the Wildenstein & Co Gallery, which sold it on 4 October that year to Ailsa Mellon Bruce. In 1970 she left it to its present owner.

== See also ==
- List of paintings by Alfred Sisley
