= A Street in Marly =

1876 painting by Alfred Sisley

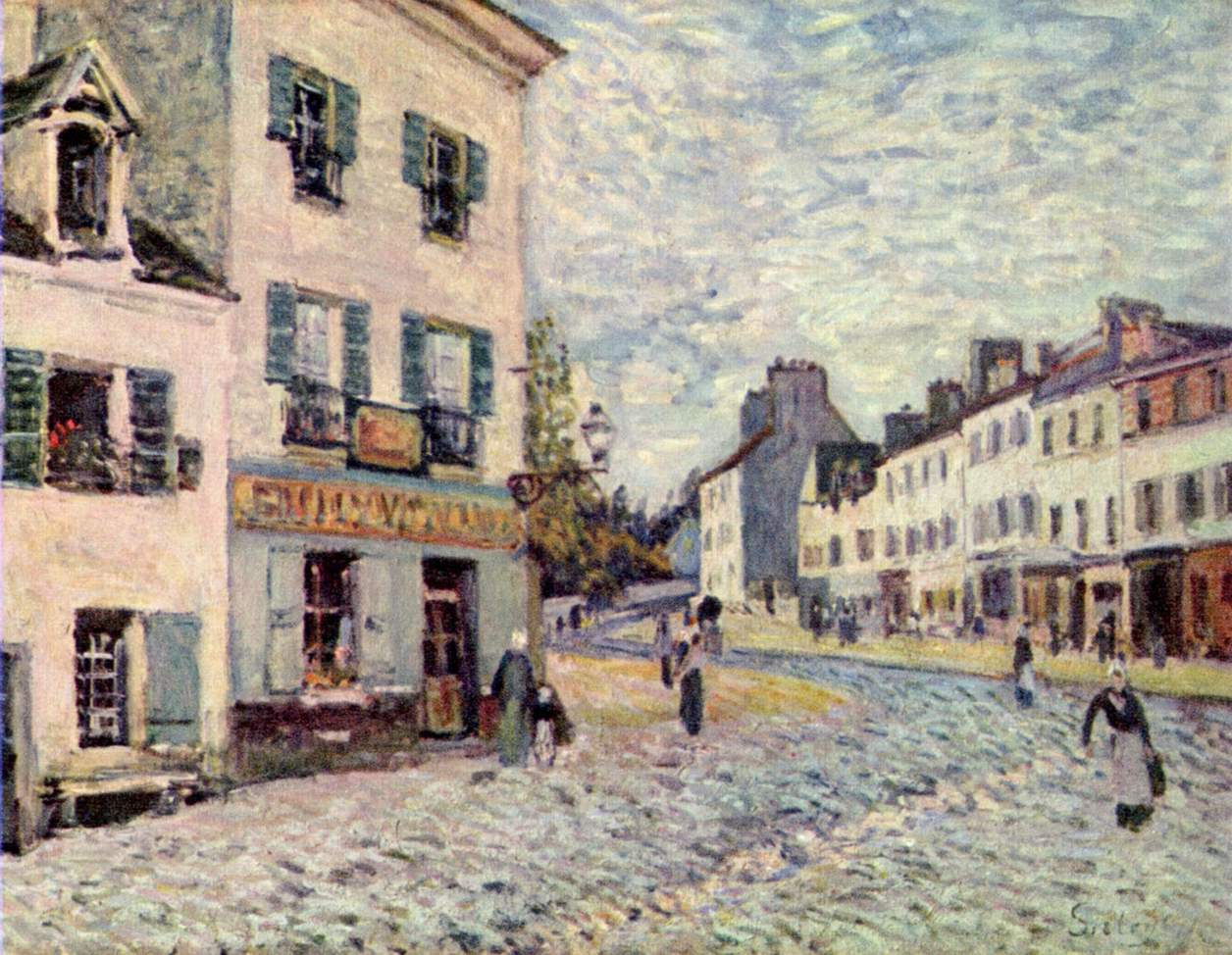
- Artist: Alfred Sisley
- Year: 1876
- Medium: Oil on canvas
- Dimensions: 50 cm × 65 cm (20 in × 26 in)
- Location: Kunsthalle Mannheim, Mannheim

A Street in Marly or Place du Marché is an oil painting by British-French artist Alfred Sisley, painted in 1876, at Port-Marly and now in the Kunsthalle Mannheim. A lifesize reproduction of it is shown near the site of its creation as part of the Pays des Impressionnistes trail.

== See also ==
- List of paintings by Alfred Sisley
