= Frost in Louveciennes =

1873 painting by Alfred Sisley

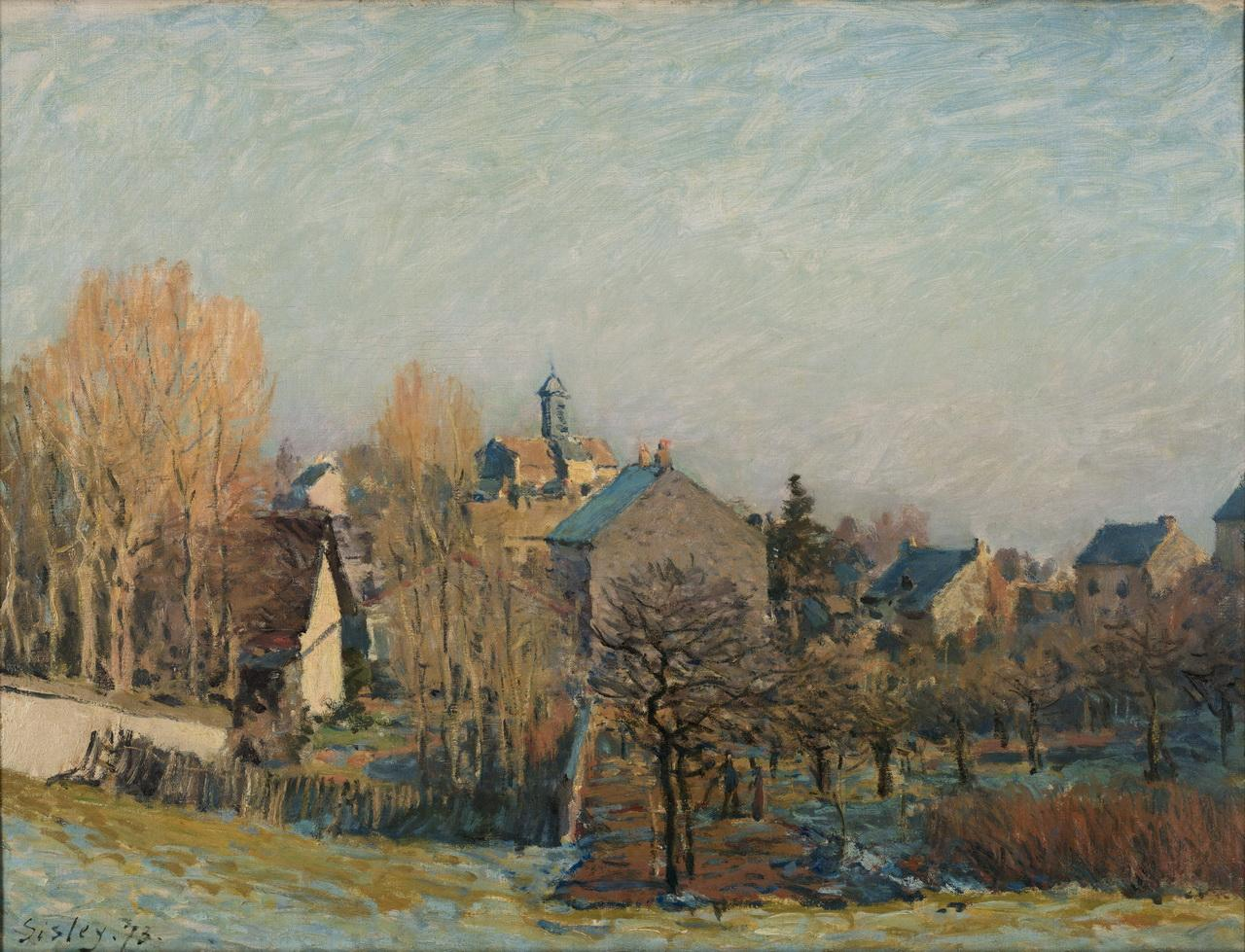
- Artist: Alfred Sisley
- Year: 1873
- Medium: Oil on canvas
- Dimensions: 46 cm × 61 cm (18 in × 24 in)
- Location: Pushkin Museum, Moscow

Frost in Louveciennes is an 1873 painting by Alfred Sisley, which has been in the Pushkin Museum since 1948. It shows the church of St Martin in the French town of Louveciennes. A chalk sketch for it is now in the Budapest Museum of Fine Arts (inventory number 1435-2788). The work's early provenance is unknown until on 3 May 1902 Paul Durand-Ruel bought it for 9300 francs at the sale of Jules Strauss's collection at the Hotel Drout auction house. In 1903 Durand-Ruel sold it on to Ivan Morozov - it was one of his first acquisitions. The Pushkin Museum holds a 22 June 1903 letter from Durand-Ruel to Morozov agreeing to sell the work for 11,500 francs, despite this being a big sacrifice for his gallery, and a 27 June receipt for receiving the money.

Morozov's collection was seized by the Soviet state after the October Revolution and entered the State Museum of New Western Art in 1923, moving to its present home on the State Museum's abolition in 1948.

== See also ==
- List of paintings by Alfred Sisley

== Bibliography (in Russian) ==
- Бессонова М. А., Георгиевская Е. Б. Франция второй половины XIX — XX века. Собрание живописи / Государственный музей изобразительных искусств имени А. С. Пушкина. — М.: Красная площадь, 2001. — 399 с. — ISBN 5-900743-58-6.
- Братья Морозовы. Великие русские коллекционеры: каталог выставки / Государственный Эрмитаж; Государственный музей изобразительных искусств имени А. С. Пушкина. — СПб.: Изд-во Гос. Эрмитажа, 2019. — 368 с. — ISBN 978-5-93572-861-8.
