= On the Bank of the Seine, Bennecourt =

1868 painting by Claude Monet

On the Banks of the Seine, Bennecourt
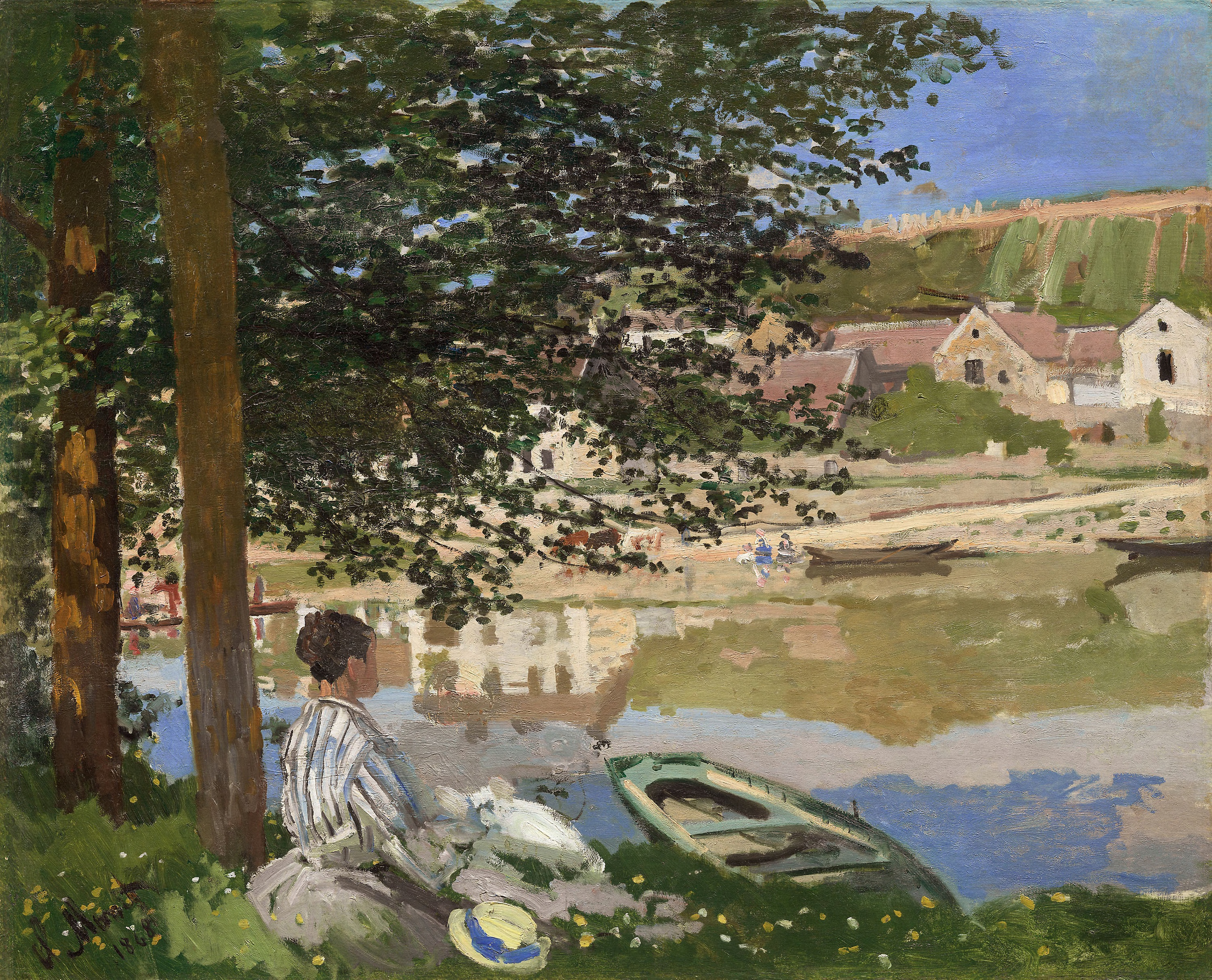
- Artist: Claude Monet
- Year: 1868
- Dimensions: 81.5 cm (32.1 in) × 100.7 cm (39.6 in)
- Location: Art Institute of Chicago
- Collection: Art Institute of Chicago
- Accession no.: 1922.427
- Identifiers: Bildindex der Kunst und Architektur ID: 20425402

On the Bank of the Seine, Bennecourt (Au bord de l’eau; Bennecourt) or River Scene at Bennecourt is an 1868 oil on canvas painting by Claude Monet, now in the collection of the Art Institute of Chicago, to which it was given by the Palmer family in 1922.

The picture portrays Monet's model, partner and future wife Camille Doncieux looking back from an island in the Seine towards the village of Gloton on the outskirts of Bennecourt, where they were temporarily staying with their young son, Jean. It was painted at a low point in Monet's life: after being thrown out of their Gloton rooms he threw himself in the river the following night (with no serious aftereffects) before returning home to Paris alone.

== Provenance ==
It had been bought by Louis Aimé Léon Clapisson of Neuilly-sur-Seine for 500 francs. He lent it to the Galerie Georges Petit for its exhibition Claude Monet; A. Rodin in 1889. Clapisson sold it for 1,500 francs on 21 April 1892 to Durand-Ruel, who on 18 May the same year sold it on to Potter Palmer of Chicago for 7,500 francs. It descended through the Palmer family, who loaned it for a time before donating it to its present owner.

== See also ==
- List of paintings by Claude Monet
