= Avenue of Chestnut Trees at La Celle-Saint-Cloud =

Painting by Alfred Sisley

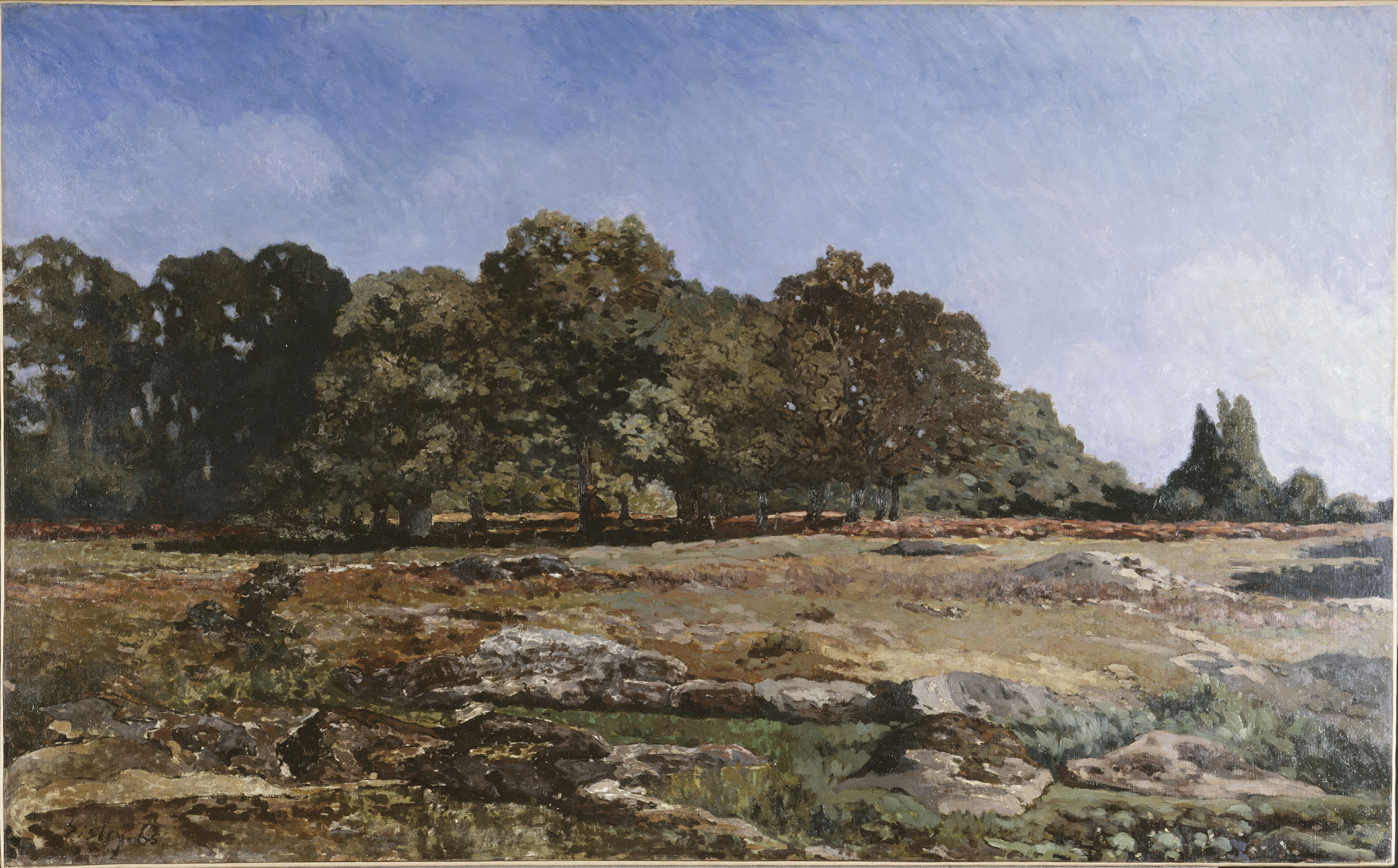
- Artist: Alfred Sisley
- Year: 1865
- Medium: oil on canvas
- Dimensions: 129 cm × 208 cm (51 in × 82 in)
- Location: Petit Palais, Paris

Avenue of Chestnut Trees at La Celle-Saint-Cloud (French: Allée de châtaigniers à La Celle-Saint-Cloud) or Edge of the Fontainebleau Forest (French: Lisière de la forêt de Fontainebleau) is an 1865 pre-Impressionist painting by Alfred Sisley, produced in the woods at La Celle-Saint-Cloud. It was refused by the Paris Salon of 1867 and bought by Jean-Baptiste Faure in 1877. It was acquired in 1919 by Joseph Duveen, who in 1921 gave it to the Petit Palais, where it still hangs.

== See also ==
- List of paintings by Alfred Sisley
