= The Bridge at Villeneuve-la-Garenne =

1872 painting by Alfred Sisley

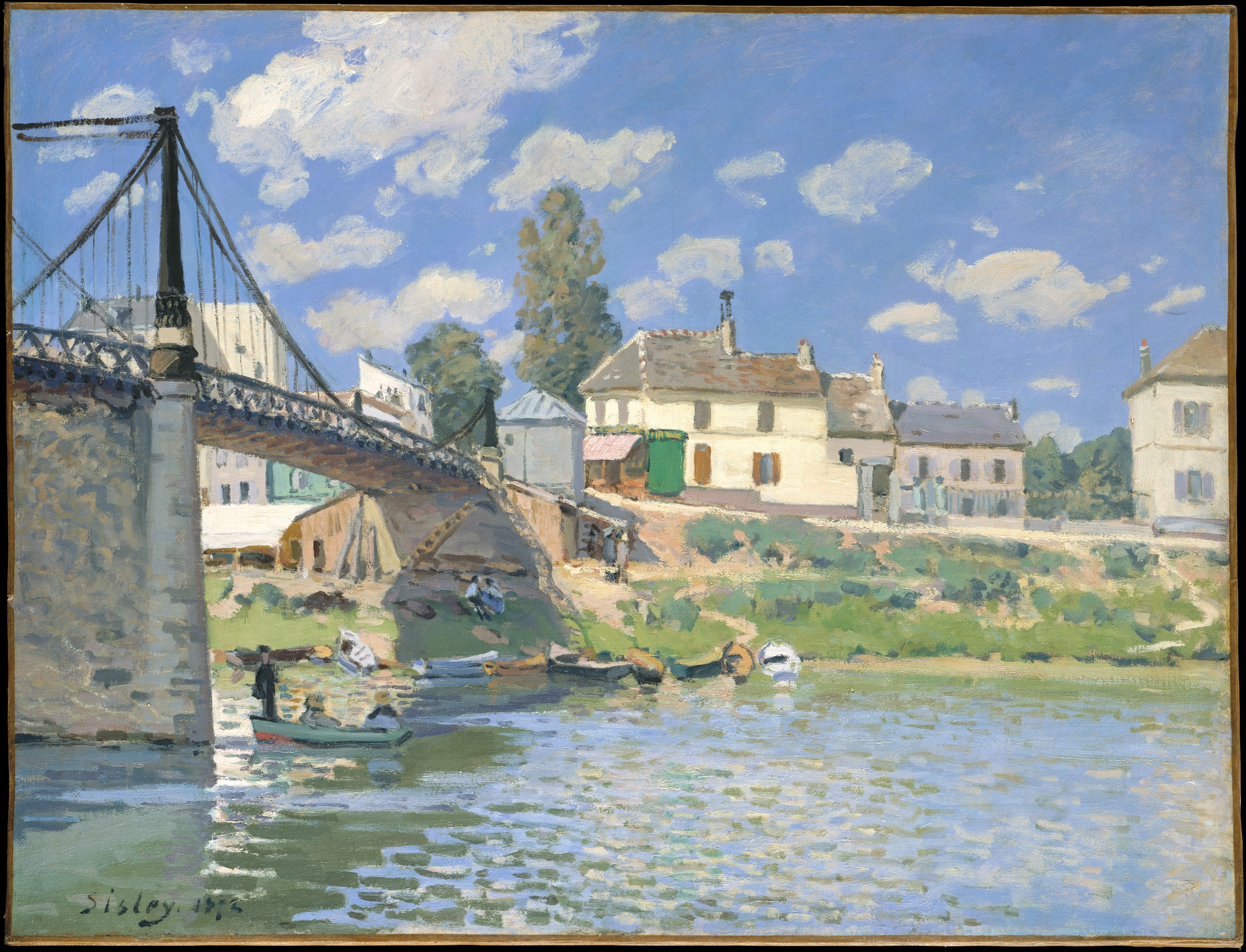
- Artist: Alfred Sisley
- Year: 1872
- Medium: Oil on canvas
- Dimensions: 49.5 cm × 65.4 cm (19.5 in × 25.7 in)
- Location: Metropolitan Museum of Art; New York City

The Bridge at Villeneuve-la-Garenne is an oil on canvas painting by Alfred Sisley created in 1872.

It depicts a suspension bridge across the Seine looking toward the village of Villeneuve-la-Garenne. Holidaymakers can be seen on the river and along the riverbank. It is one of several paintings made by Sisley in the vicinity of the Île-Saint-Denis in 1872.

The bridge depicted was built in 1844 and replaced around 1900. It connects to present-day Avenue de Verdun in Villeneuve-la-Garenne, and the riverside road that runs north from the bridge now bears the name Quai Alfred Sisley.

The work is now in the Metropolitan Museum of Art in New York City.

== Provenance ==
It was bought from the artist on 24 August 1872 by Durand-Ruel, who sold it to Jean-Baptiste Faure on 15 April 1873. It was passed on to his son Louis Maurice's wife, who sold it to Georges Petit and Durand-Ruel in 1919. It was passed through various art dealers before being acquired by Fernand Bouisson sometime before 1930. It was then sold in New York and had been acquired by 1957 by Henry Ittleson Junior and his wife, who donated it to its present owner in 1964.

== See also ==
- List of paintings by Alfred Sisley
