= View of the Canal Saint-Martin =

1870 painting by Alfred Sisley

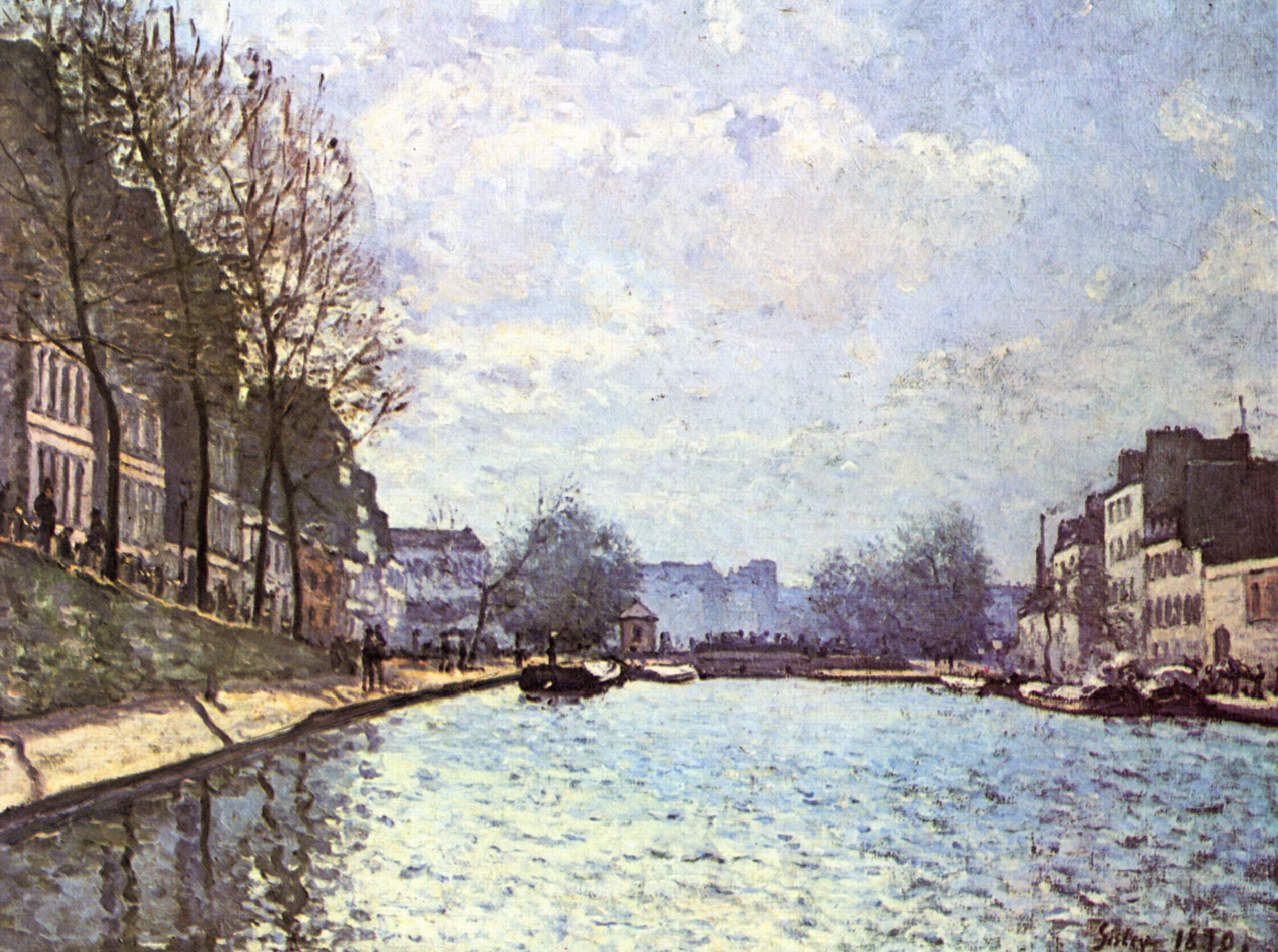
- Artist: Alfred Sisley
- Year: 1870
- Medium: Oil on canvas
- Dimensions: 50 cm × 65 cm (20 in × 26 in)
- Location: Musée d'Orsay, Paris

View of the Canal Saint-Martin is an 1870 oil-on-canvas painting by Alfred Sisley, first exhibited at the Paris Salon of 1870. It was acquired by Gaudoin or Pierre-Firmin (both art dealers). It was then bought by Dr Paul Gachet for 170 francs before 1883. Gachet's son owned it from 1909 onwards and donated it to the Louvre in 1951. It is now in the Musée d'Orsay.

== Description ==
This landscape depicts a large expanse of the Canal Saint-Martin in Paris. Warehouses and other buildings overlook the canal on both sides, with a number of moored boats at the quay. A pedestrian bridge across the canal can be seen in the distance.

== See also ==
- List of paintings by Alfred Sisley
