= Under Hampton Court Bridge =

Painting by Alfred Sisley

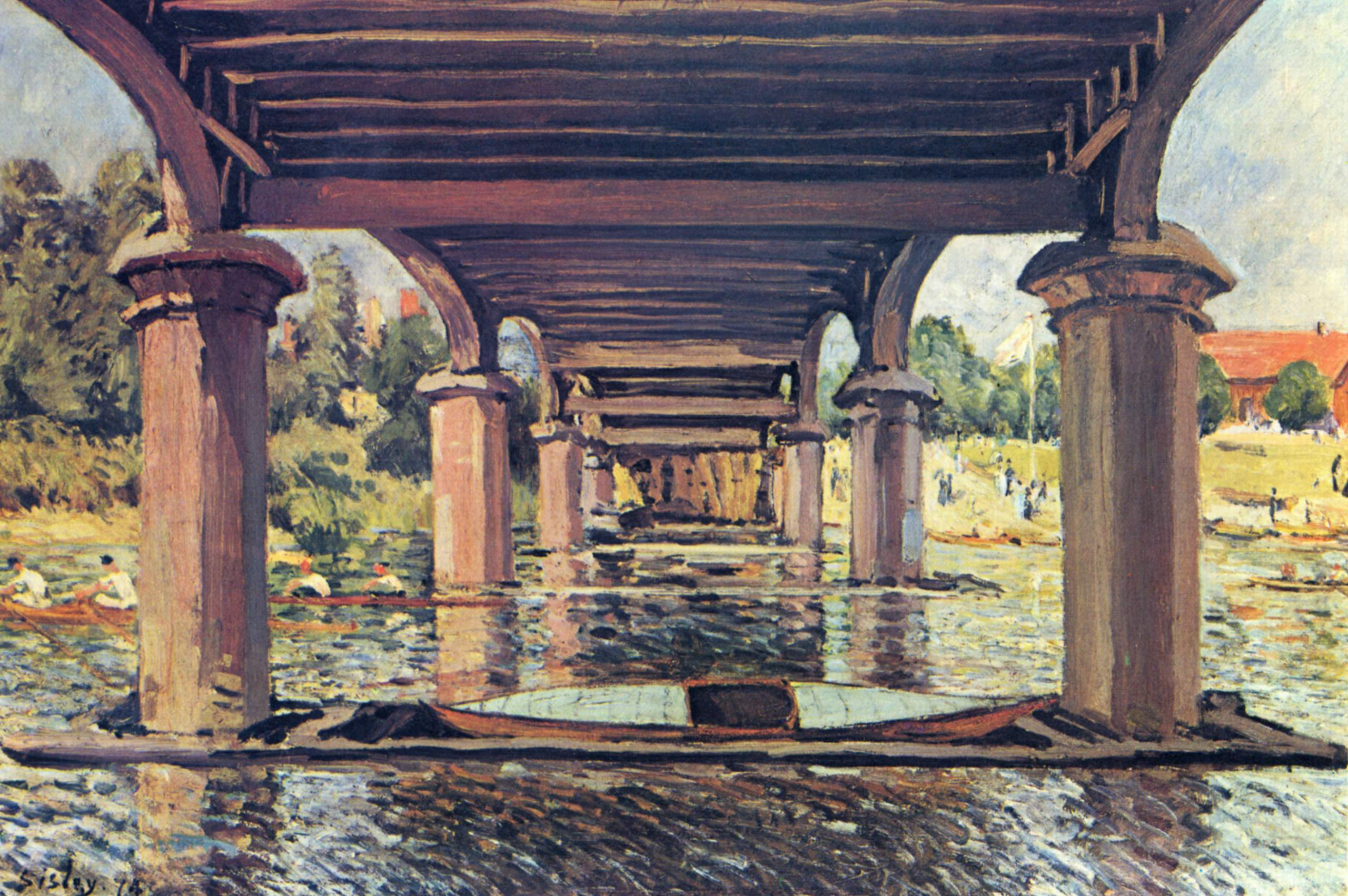
- Artist: Alfred Sisley
- Year: 1874
- Medium: Oil on canvas
- Dimensions: 50 cm × 76 cm (20 in × 30 in)
- Location: Kunstmuseum Winterthur, Switzerland

Under Hampton Court Bridge is an 1874 painting by Alfred Sisley, now in the Kunstmuseum Winterthur in Switzerland, to which it was given by Dr. Herbert and Charlotte Wolfer de Armas in 1973.

== See also ==
- List of paintings by Alfred Sisley
