= Alfred Sisley =

19th-century French painter

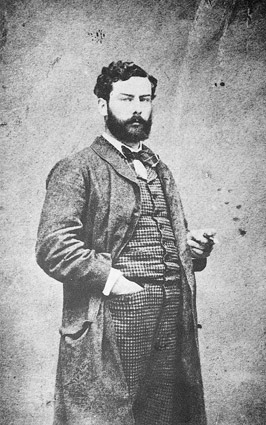
- Sisley in March 1863
- Born: 30 October 1839; Paris, France
- Died: 29 January 1899 (aged 59); Moret-sur-Loing, France
- Education: Marc-Charles-Gabriel Gleyre
- Known for: Painting
- Movement: Impressionism
- Patrons: Paul Durand-Ruel, Georges Petit, Jean-Baptiste Faure

Signature
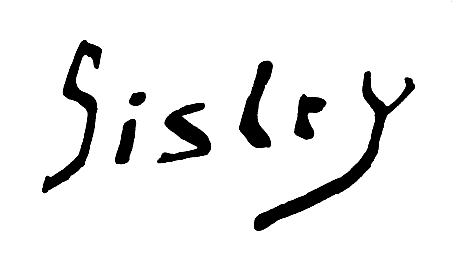

Alfred Sisley (/ˈsɪsli/; French: [sislɛ]; 30 October 1839 – 29 January 1899) was a French-born British Impressionist landscape painter, born in Paris to British expatriate parents. Considered the most consistent of the Impressionists in his dedication to painting en plein air (outdoors), Sisley's oeuvre comprises almost entirely landscapes, with his most important works including series of paintings around Hampton Court on the River Thames, the floods at Marly-le-Roi in 1875, and the Gothic church at Moret-sur-Loing. He also produced notable paintings portraying riverside scenes on the Seine in the suburbs west of Paris throughout his career.

Sisley received little critical recognition or financial reward for his work during his lifetime, spending most of his career in reduced circumstances, dependent on the support of patrons and art dealers. Sisley's work has since received posthumous critical and market re-appraisal, recognising Sisley's important contribution to Impressionism and French landscape painting.

== Life ==
Sisley was born in Paris (Note: At 19 Rue des Trois-Bornes in the 4th (now 11th) arrondissement. The house is marked by a commemorative plaque. Alfred was the only of William and Felicia's children to be born in France: Elizabeth-Emily (the oldest) and Henry (1832) were born in Dover, Aline-Frances (1834) in London.) on 30 October 1839, the youngest of four children of William Sisley, (Note: Born near Dunkirk on 6 December 1799.) an affluent merchant of imported luxury goods, (Note: Previous generations of the Sisley family had engaged in cross-Channel smuggling of luxury goods between Kent and France, later trading from legitimate offices based in London and Paris.) and Felicia Sell. (Note: Felicia, 19 years old when she married William (her cousin) in 1827, was described as 'quite the French woman' (who went by Felicété), and a 'fine tall woman' with developed music and literary tastes.) Little is known of Sisley's childhood in Paris, other than his education was bilingual (French and English).

At the age of 18 (in 1857) Sisley was sent to London to live and study with his English relatives for a career in the family import-export business. According to his confidante and biographer Gustave Geffroy, Sisley 'remained there for a few years, but above all learned painting from Turner and Constable, and literature from Shakespeare's plays.' Having shown no aptitude for business, Sisley returned to Paris in 1861.

Later in 1861 Sisley began studying at the École des Beaux-Arts in Paris within the atelier of Swiss artist Marc-Charles-Gabriel Gleyre, where he befriended Frédéric Bazille, Claude Monet, and Pierre-Auguste Renoir. Frustrated with the bounds of the studio and strictures of the classicist Gleyre, the group (led by Monet) (Note: "'Let's get out of here' I told them. 'This place is unhealthy: there's no sincerity here.' We left after.a fortnight of lessons of this kind." - Monet recounting to French newspaper Excelsior (journal) in 1921.) quickly began to make regular excursions to locales around Paris to paint en plein air landscapes (see Works). Unlike his friends Monet and Renoir, Sisley benefited from financial support from his family while studying. (Note: Bazille's family were wealthy wine merchants.) Renoir and Sisley became close friends and shared a studio, and Renoir became well known to Sisley's family: William commissioning his portrait from him (see picture).

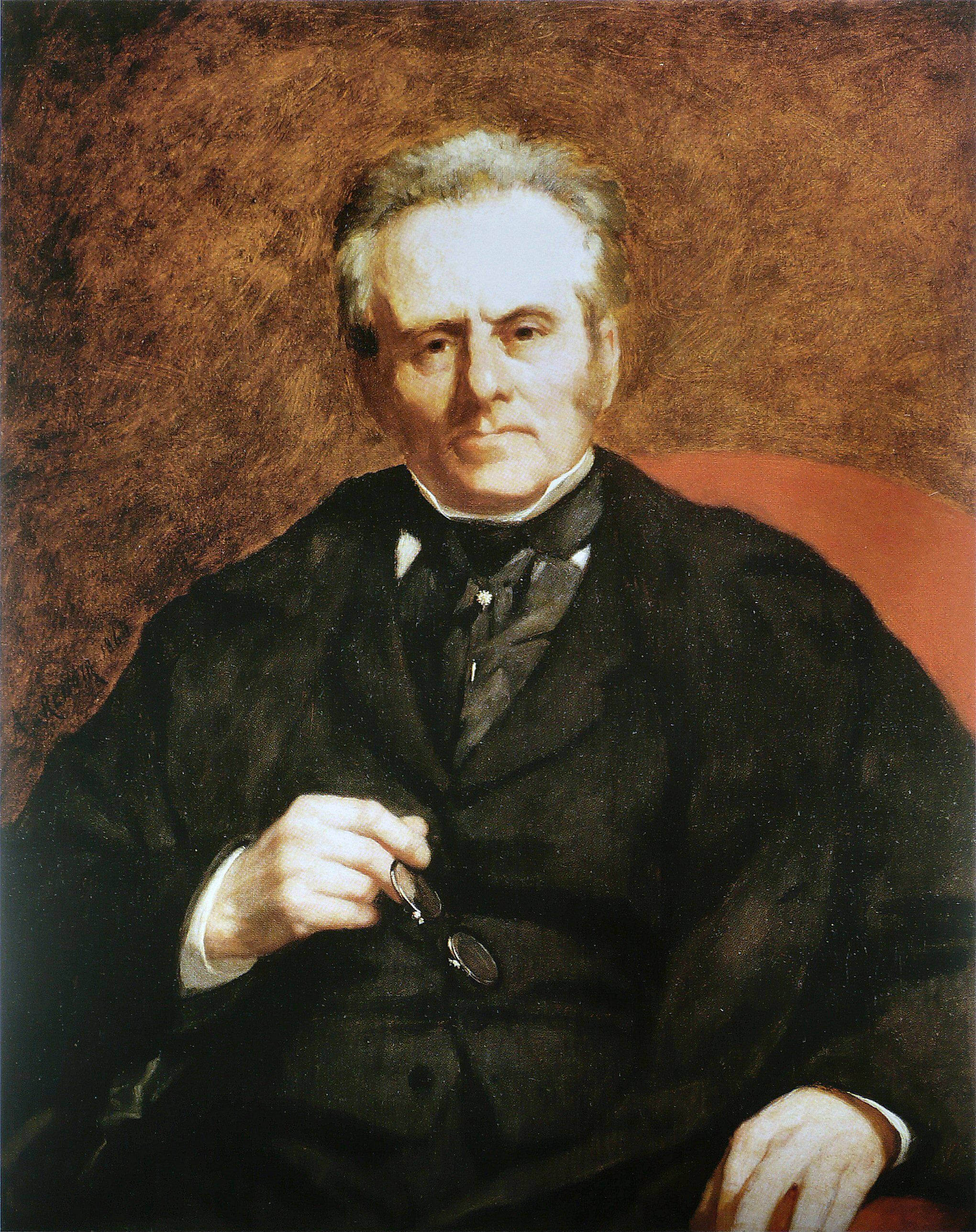
William Sisley (1864), Renoir, Musée d'Orsay, Paris

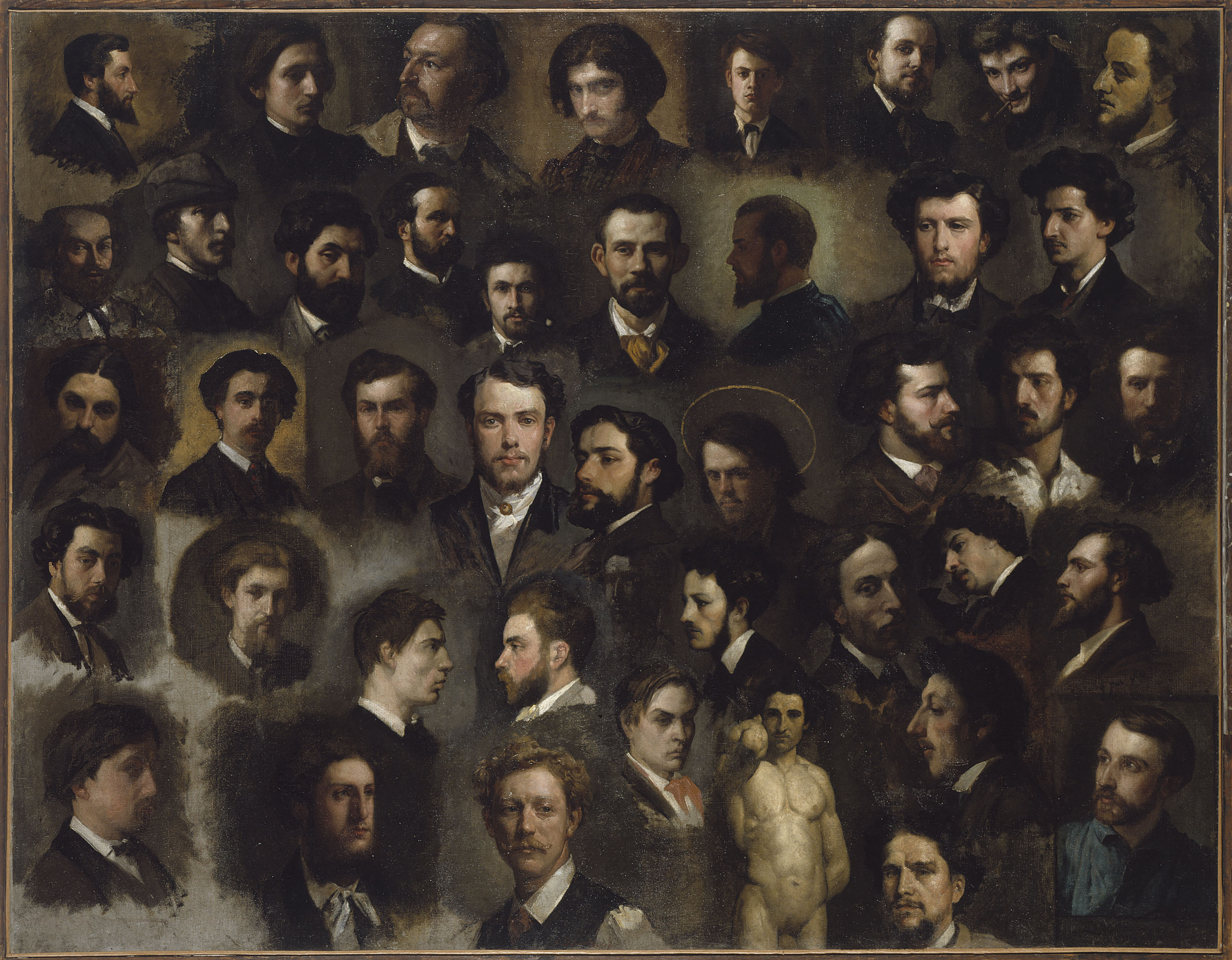
Quarante-trois portraits de peintres de l'atelier Gleyre (Forty-three portraits of painters from the Gleyre studio) (1856-68), Petit Palais, Paris (Note: Sisley is third from the left on the third row, painted by Cabat. Renoir is directly below Sisley facing right.)

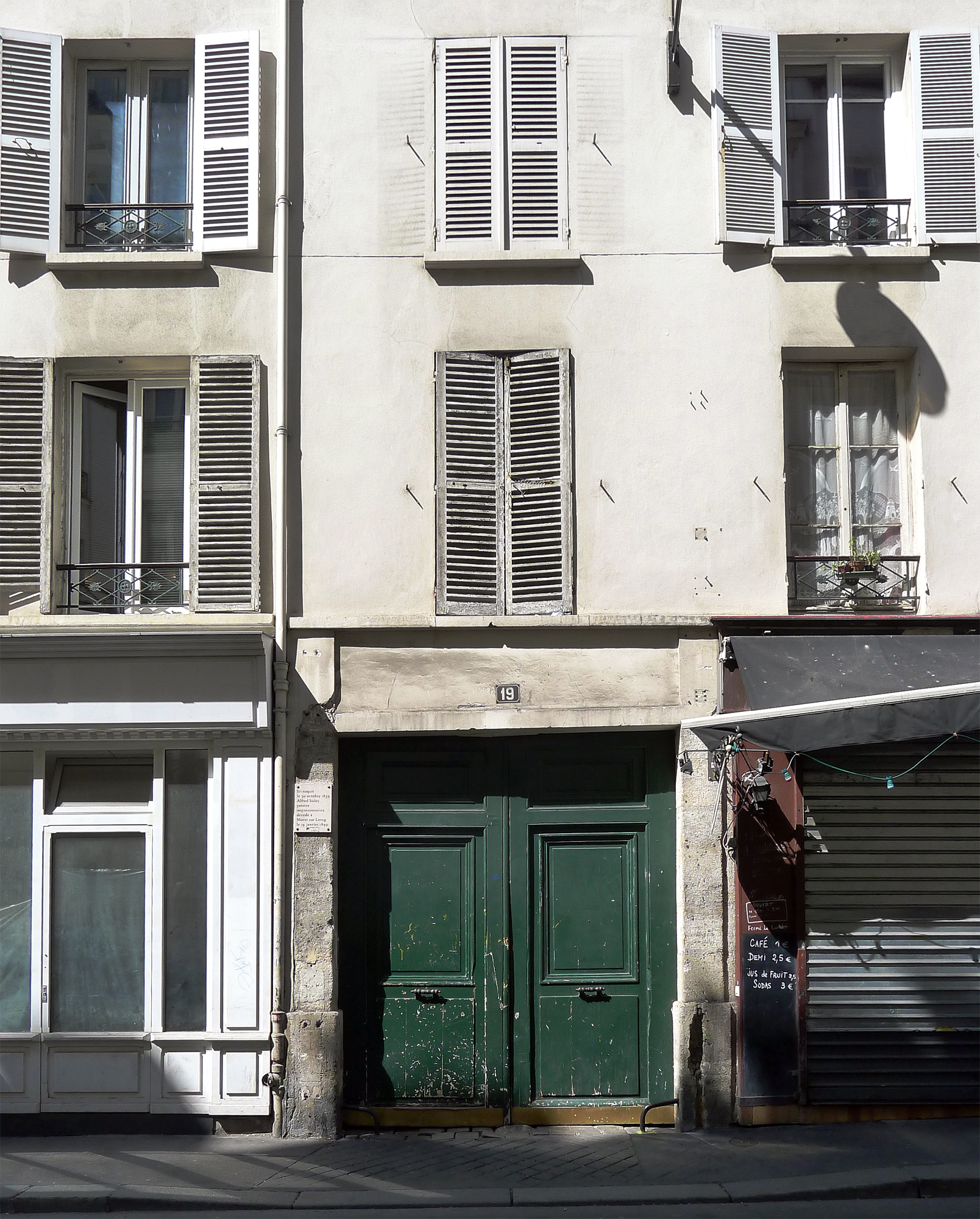
Sisley's birthplace and childhood home, No. 19 de la rue des Trois-Bornes, Paris.

Sisley met his future wife Eugénie Lescouezec (1834–1898) (Note: Marie Louise Adelaide Eugénie Lescouezec, born 17 October 1834 in Toul.) in 1866, while she was working as an artists model (Note: Renoir reportedly descibed her as: "She had a very sensitive nature and was exceedingly well bred. She had taken up posing because her family had been ruined in some financial venture.") and florist living in the Batignolles quarter of Paris. The couple's first child, Pierre, was born in Paris in June 1867, while Sisley was based in Honfleur, Normandy, a picturesque holiday resort popular with artists. Their daughter Jeanne-Adèle was born in January 1869; their second son, Jacques, born November 1871, died in infancy.

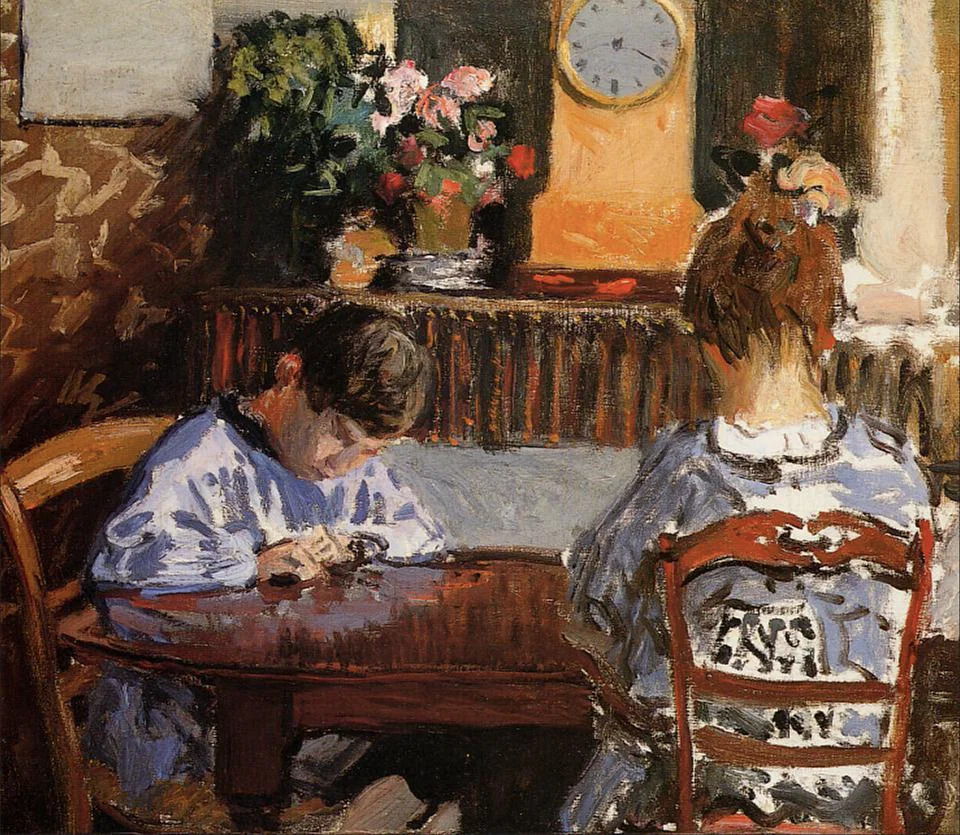
La Leçon / Portrait of the Artist's Children: The Lesson (c1872), Private collection (Note: This painting of his children is the only known extant portrait by Sisley. Sisley's children reputedly also appear in two paintings made by Sisley in the countryside outside Louveciennes in 1873: Enfants jouant dans la prairie / Children playing in the meadow or Country Road, Springtime, Private Collection and Printemps à Bougival / Spring at Bougival, Philadelphia Museum of Art.)

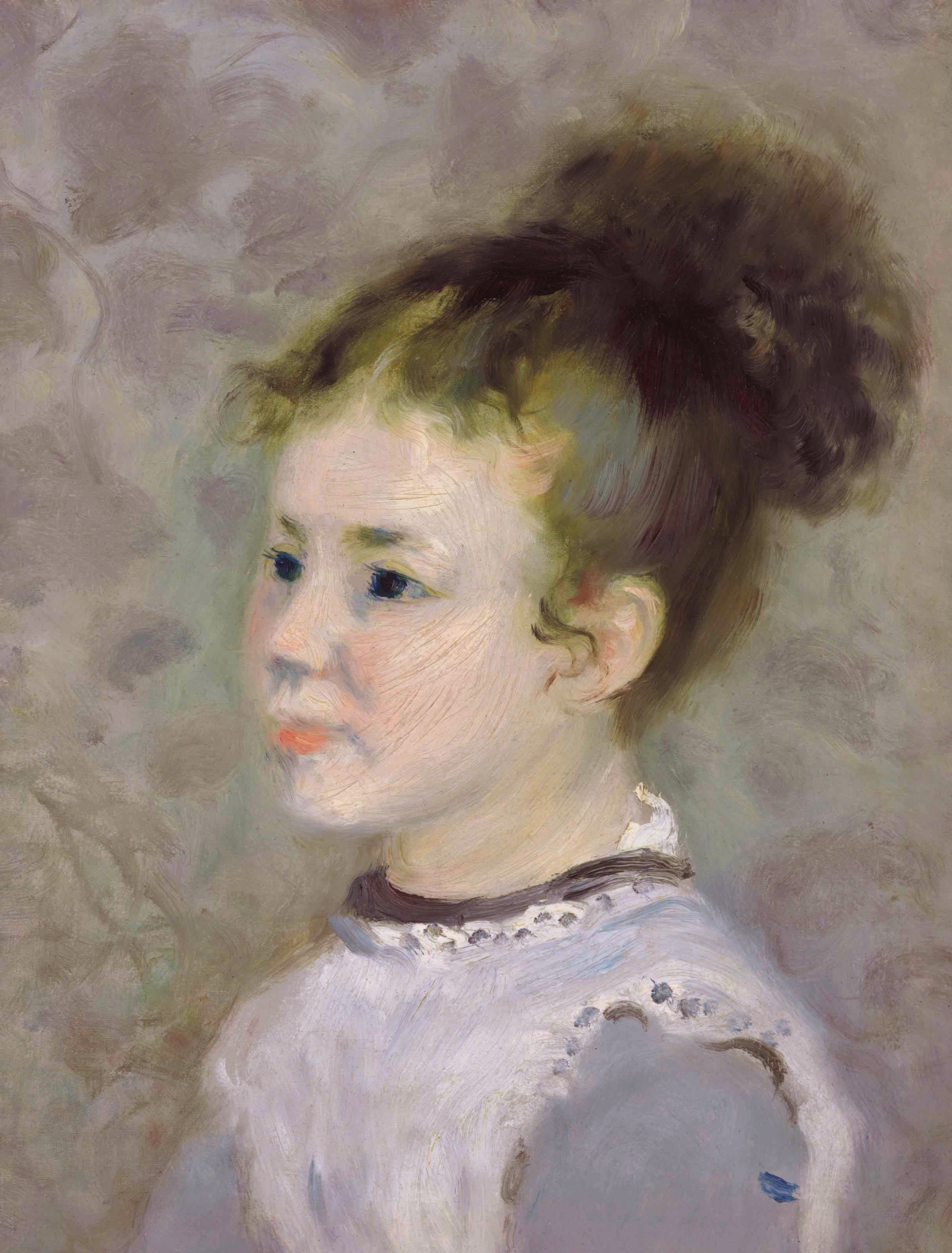
Portrait de Jeanne Sisley / Portrait of Jeanne Sisley (c1875) Renoir, Private collection

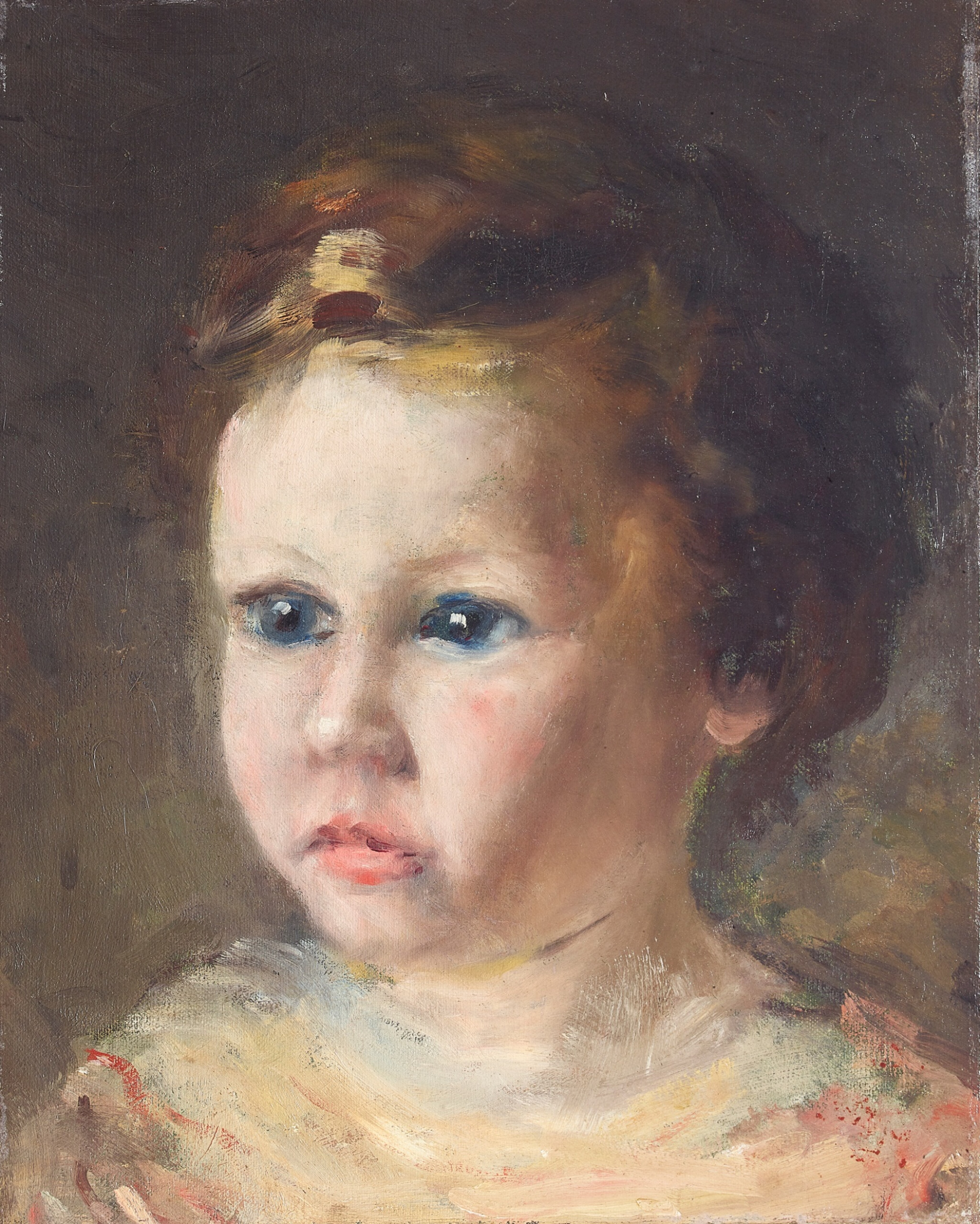
Portrait de Pierre Sisley / Portrait of Pierre Sisley (c1875) Renoir, Private collection

In 1870-71 the financial security that Sisley had enjoyed via remittances from his family came to an abrupt end, due to the calamitous effect the outbreak of the Franco-Prussian War had on William Sisley's trading business, and ostracism and enstrangement on the grounds of Eugénie's humble and unmarried status. Sisley's financial position would remain precarious for the remainder of his life, dependent on the support of patrons, friends and the sale of his works (see Works).

Sisley would visit Britain on three occasions. The first occurred in 1874 after the First Impressionist Exhibition, accompanying his patron the opera singer Jean-Baptiste Faure to London, producing twenty paintings of the non-tidal Thames at East Molesey around Hampton Court Bridge later described by art historian Kenneth Clark as "a perfect moment of Impressionism." A visit to the Isle of Wight in 1881 had to be abandoned when the canvases and materials Sisley had arranged to be shipped from France were never delivered.

The third visit, in the summer of 1897, was undertaken by Alfred and Eugénie towards the end of their lives (Note: Alfred was 57, Eugénie 62.), with Eugénie in the early stages of throat cancer. Sponsored by his patron François Depeaux, who was visiting Cardiff on business, the couple settled in neighbouring Penarth, where Sisley began painting from the cliffs overlooking the town. Sisley made the acquaintance of the French consul in Cardiff Adolphe de Trobiaud, (Note: A reference in one of his letters indicates that Sisley was introduced to de Tobiaud by his daughter Jeanne, who may have travelled with them.) who on 3 August formally certified Eugénie the mother of Alfred's children; two days later Alfred and Eugénie were married at Cardiff Register Office, thereby legitimising their children and securing their inheritance. (Note: It was significantly easier for Sisley to marry as a British citizen in Wales than France, and doing so in Cardiff avoided any unwanted publicity.) The couple honeymooned at the Osborne Hotel at Langland Bay on the Gower Peninsula, where Sisley painted in and around Langland Bay and Rotherslade (then called Lady's Cove).

The couple returned to Moret in October 1897. In early 1898 Sisley applied for French citizenship, but was initially refused. A second application later that year was made and supported by a police report, but illness intervened. Alfred Sisley remained solely a British citizen his entire life.

Eugénie Sisley died on 8 October 1898 and was buried in Moret cemetery the following day. Alfred was by then succumbing to the ravages of throat cancer and was unable to attend the funeral. Alfred Sisley died on 29 January 1899 at the age of 59. His funeral was held on 1 February and attended by his children Jeanne and Pierre joined by his friends Claude Monet, Auguste Renoir, Jean-Charles Cazin, Albert Lebourg, and Adolphe Tavernier, and dignitaries from Moret.

In the days before his death, Sisley had spoken with his friend Monet and asked him to take care of his children, who were now left without resources other than the numerous unsold paintings in their father's studio. Monet arranged for a benefit auction to be held at Galerie Georges Petit held on 1 May 1899 for sale of 'Paintings, studies and pastels from his studio and those given to his children by other artists'. The former comprised 27 paintings and 6 pastels by Sisley, the latter numerous works donated at Monet's request by Sisley's friends and contacts across the Impressionist movement. (Note: Pissarro, Renoir, Cezanne, Guillaumin, Degas each donated works) The auction and sales raised 145,000 francs for Sisley's estate.

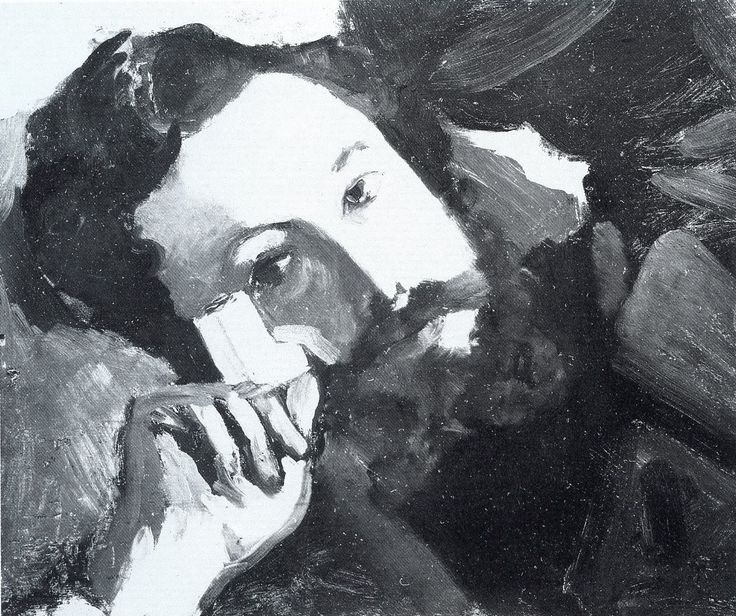
Portrait d'Alfred Sisley / Portrait of Alfred Sisley (c1867-68), Frédéric Bazille (Note: Destroyed in the Second World War)

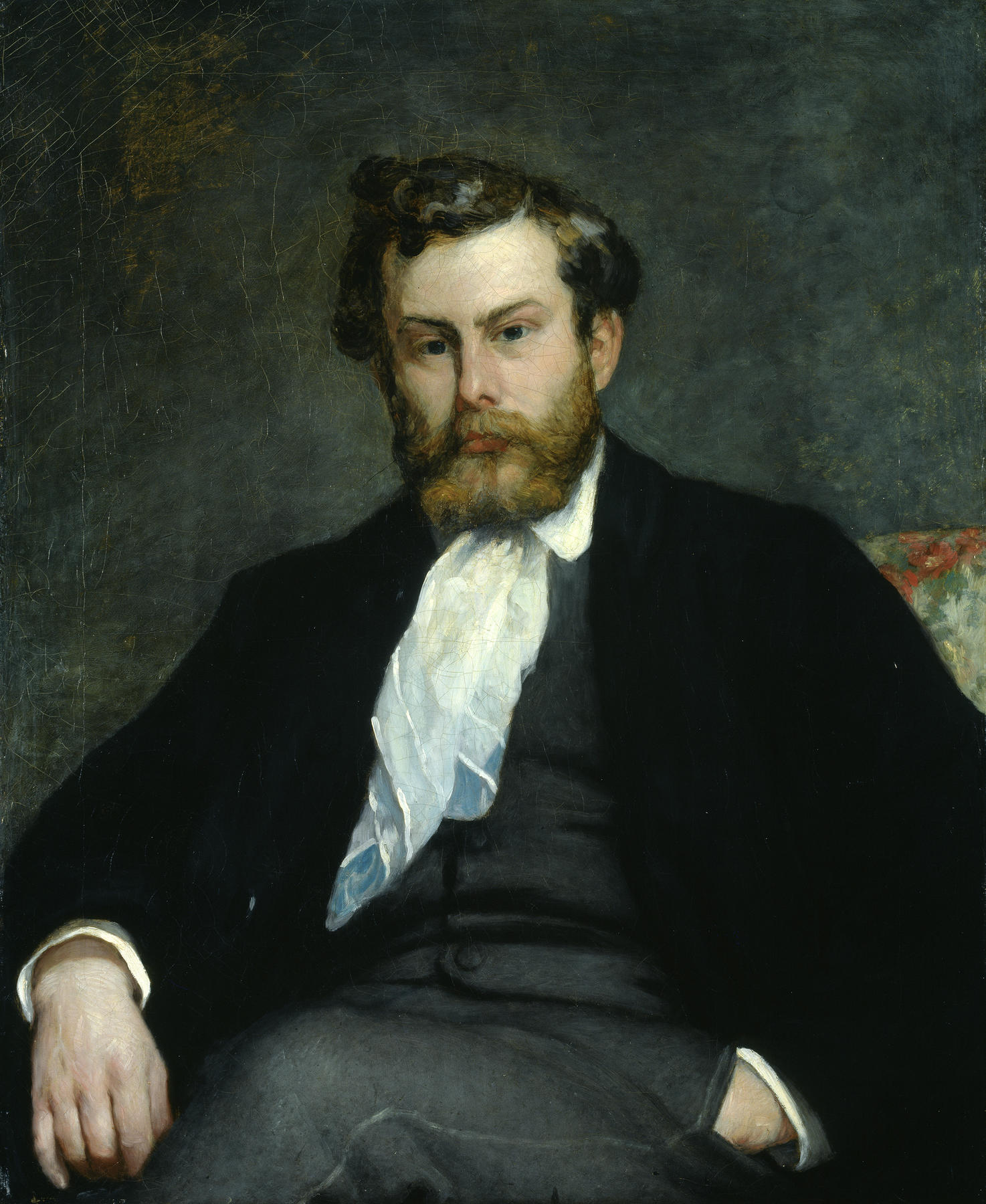
Alfred Sisley (1864), Renoir, Kunsthaus Zürich

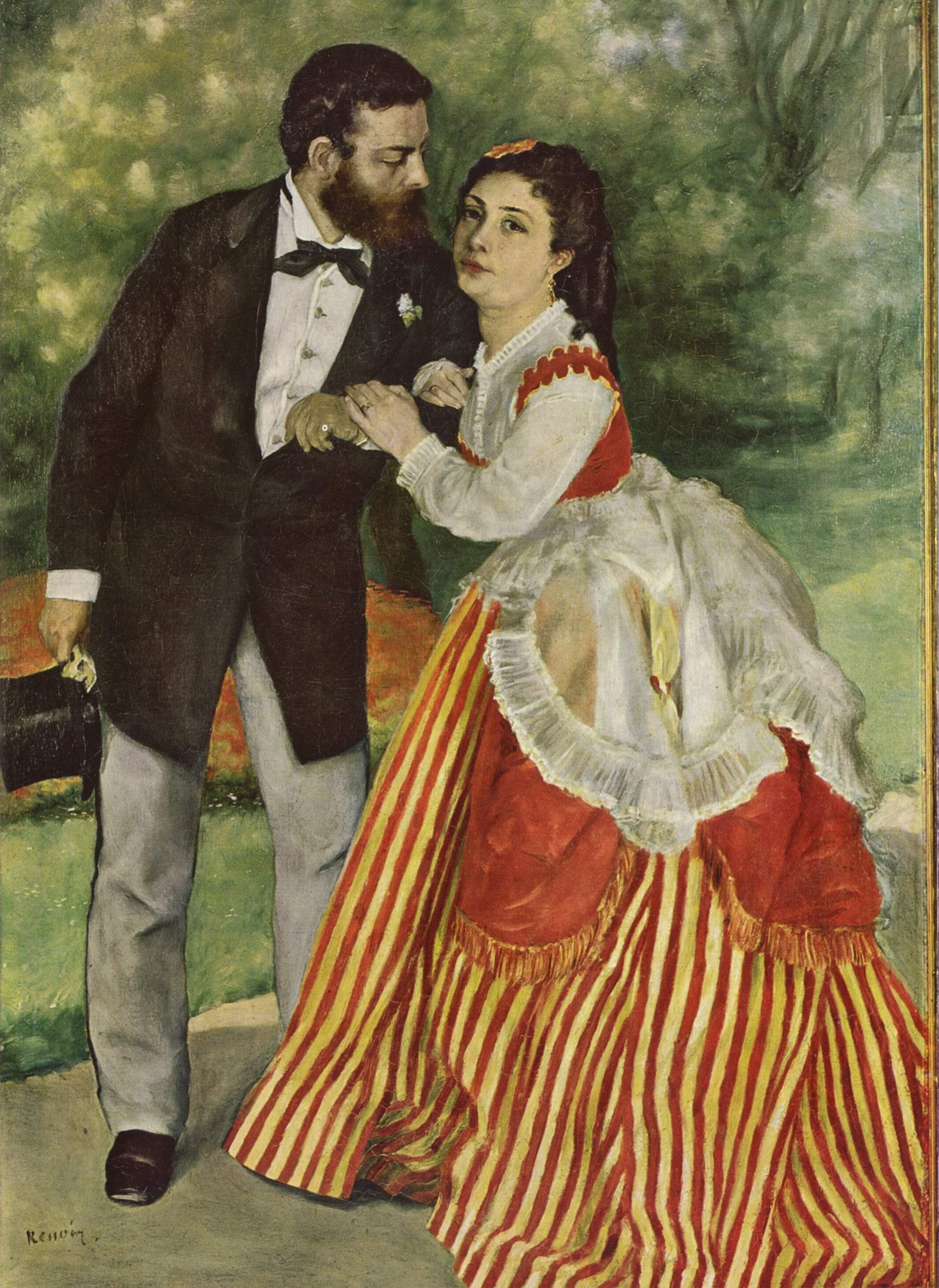
Les Fiancés / A Couple (1868), Renoir, Wallraf–Richartz Museum, Cologne (Note: Also known as The Engaged Couple or Alfred Sisley and his Wife, showing Sisley posed with model Lise Tréhot.)

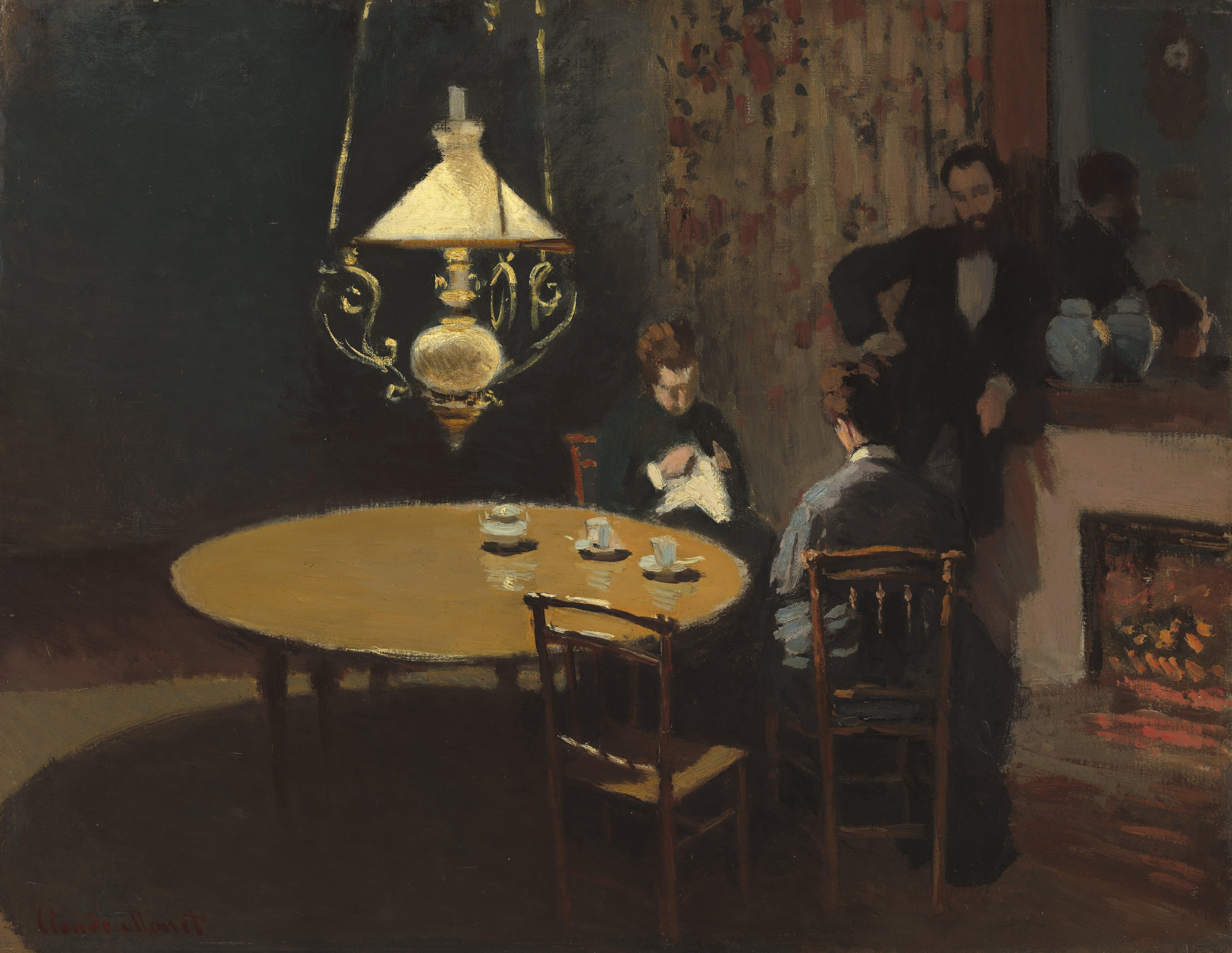
Intérieur, Après dîner / Interior, after Dinner (1868-69), Claude Monet National Gallery of Art, Washington D.C.

Portraits of Sisley by his friends

== Works ==
Sisley produced over 900 oil paintings, some 100 pastels and many other drawings. Sisley's student works at the École des Beaux-Arts under Gleyre are lost, (Note: Avenue near a Small Town (1864), previously attributed as an early work by Sisley, was discovered to be signed by Paul Vogler during a 2015-2016 restoration at Kunsthalle Bremen.) and his studio in Bougival was destroyed at the outbreak of the Franco-Prussian War.

Sisley along with Monet, Renoir and Bazille would paint landscapes en plein air rather than in the studio in order to capture the transient effects of sunlight realistically. This approach, innovative at the time, resulted in paintings more colourful and more broadly painted than the public was accustomed to seeing. Consequently, Sisley and his friends initially had few opportunities to exhibit or sell their work. Their paintings were usually rejected by the jury of the most important art exhibition in France, the annual Salon.His first landscape paintings are sombre, coloured with dark browns, greens, and pale blues. They were often executed at Marly and Saint-Cloud. Little is known about Sisley's relationship with the paintings of J. M. W. Turner and John Constable, which he may have seen in London, but some have suggested that these artists may have influenced his development as an Impressionist painter, as may have Gustave Courbet and Jean-Baptiste-Camille Corot.

He was inspired by the style and subject matter of previous modern painters Camille Pissarro and Édouard Manet. Among the Impressionists, Sisley has been overshadowed by Monet, whose work his resembles in style and subject matter, although Sisley's effects are more subdued. Described by art historian Robert Rosenblum as having "almost a generic character, an impersonal textbook idea of a perfect Impressionist painting", his work strongly invokes atmosphere, and his skies are always impressive. He concentrated on landscape more consistently than any other Impressionist painter.

Among Sisley's best-known works are Street in Moret and Sand Heaps, both owned by the Art Institute of Chicago, and The Bridge at Moret-sur-Loing, shown at Musée d'Orsay, Paris. Allée des peupliers de Moret (The Lane of Poplars at Moret) has been stolen three times from the Musée des Beaux-Arts in Nice – once in 1978 when on loan in Marseilles (recovered a few days later in the city's sewers), again in 1998 (when the museum's curator was convicted of the theft and jailed for five years with two accomplices), and finally in August 2007 (on 4 June 2008 French police recovered it and three other stolen paintings from a van in Marseilles).

== Legacy ==
=== Stolen and looted paintings ===
During the Nazi period (1933–1945) a number of Sisley works were taken from Jewish art collectors by Nazis or their agents (such as the E.R.R.) as part of the widespread looting of property owned by Jews which preceded the Holocaust. Several of these stolen paintings have been the subject of restitution efforts and litigation.

- In 2004 Sisley's Soleil de printemps, le Loing (1892) was restored to the family of Louis Hirsch, in a ceremony in Paris.
- In 2008 Bateaux en Réparation à Saint Mammès (1885) was recognised as having been looted by the Nazis, and was the subject of a settlement with the heirs of Benno and Frances Bernstein (who had owned it before Nazi occupation).
- In 2016 a dispute erupted between Alain Dreyfus, an art dealer in Switzerland, and the auction house Christie's, over Sisley's Premier jour de printemps à Moret (1889). Dreyfus, who had purchased the painting at auction in 2008, was subject to a claim by Daniel Lindon family that the painting had been looted from his grandfather Abner Lindenbaum. Dreyfus alleged that Christie's had not sufficiently examined the work's provenance before putting it up for sale, and not disputing the Lindon family's claim, sought reimbursement of the purchase price plus interest from Christie's.

Numerous Sisleys looted by the Nazis have still have not been found. The German Lost Art Foundation has 24 listings for Sisley.

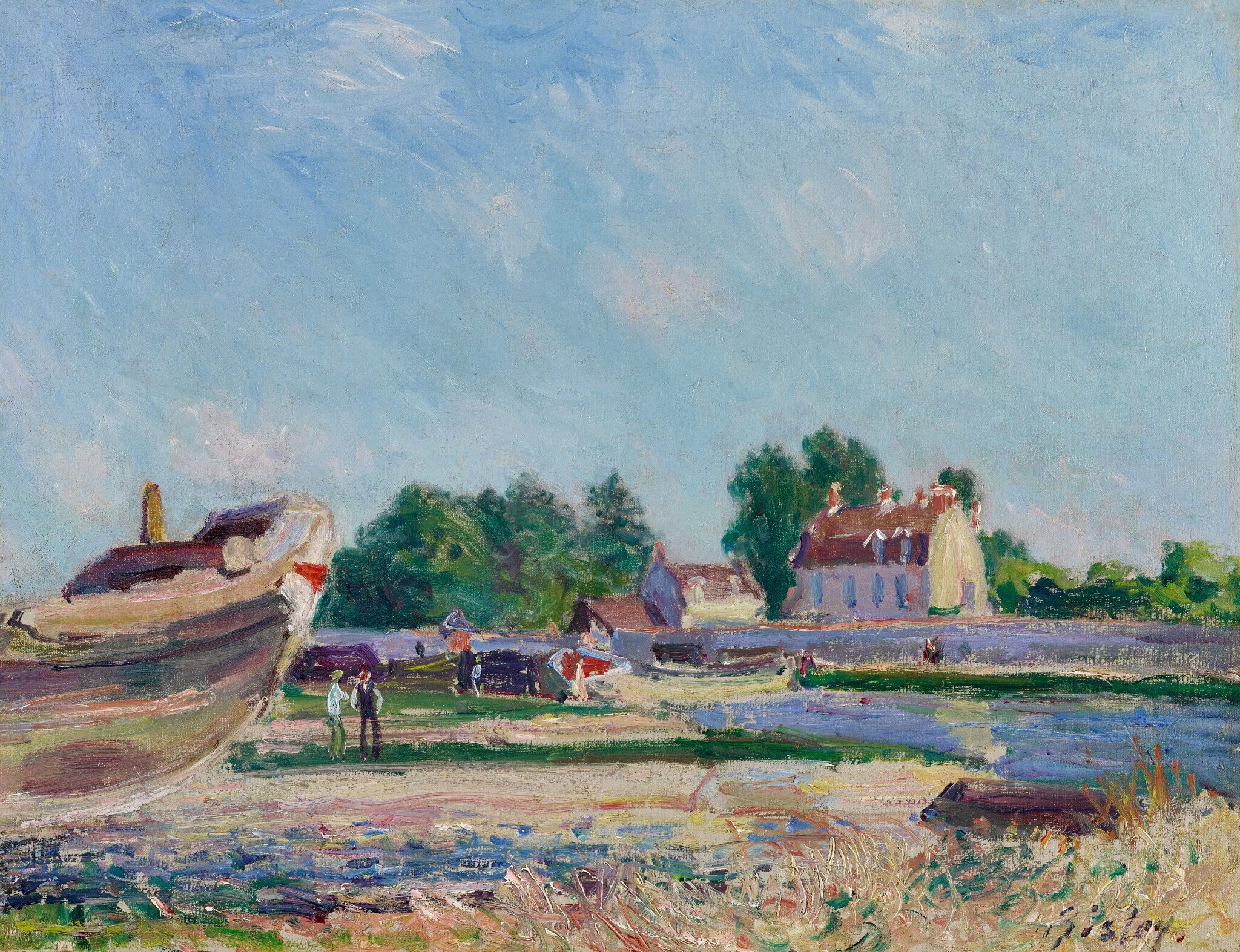
Bateaux en réparation à Saint-Mammès, canal du Loing / Boats under repair at Saint-Mammès, Loing canal (1885)

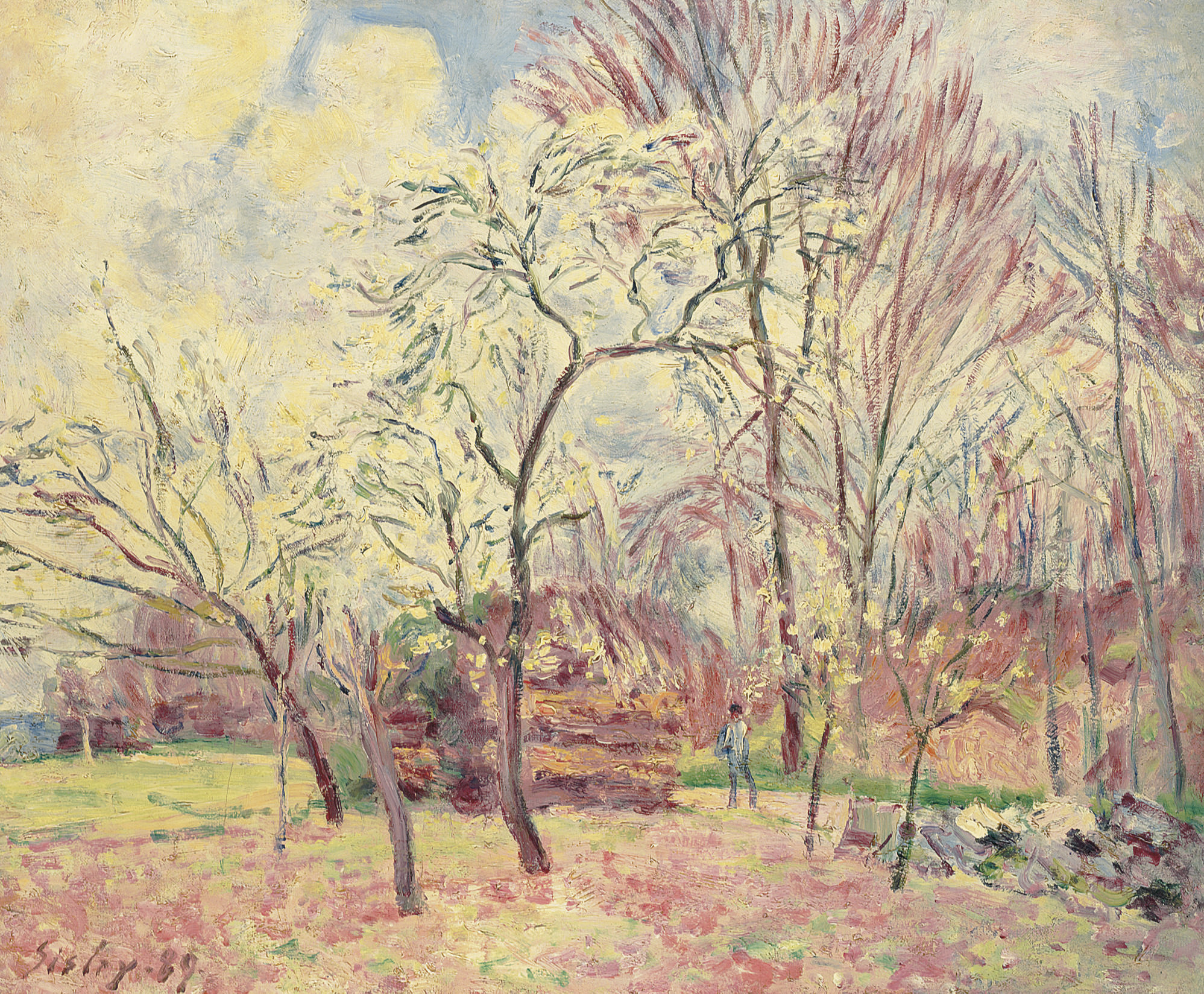
Premier jour de printemps à Moret / First Day of Spring in Moret (1889)

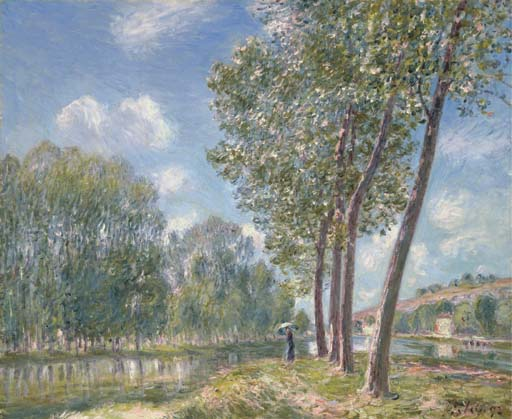
Soleil de printemps - Le Loing / Spring Sunshine on the Loing (1892)

Stolen works by Sisley

== Exhibitions ==
Significant retrospective exhibitions of Sisley's works include:

- Alfred Sisley (1992-1993) - Royal Academy of Arts, London: 3 July to 18 October 1992; Musée d'Orsay, Paris: 28 October 1992 to 31 January 1993; Walters Art Museum, Baltimore: 14 March to 13 June 1993.
- Alfred Sisley retrospective (2000) - Isetan Museum, Tokyo: 2 March to 17 April 2000; Takamatsu City Art Museum, Kagawa: 22 April to 21 May 2000; Hiroshima Museum of Art: 27 May to 2 July 2000; The Museum of Modern Art, Wakayama: 8 July to 10 September 2000.
- Sisley: Poet of Impressionism (2002-2003) - “Alfred Sisley: Poeta dell'Impressionismo” - Palazzo dei Diamanti, Ferrara: 17 February to 19 May 2002; “Alfred Sisley: Poeta del Impresionismo” - Thyssen-Bornemisza National Museum, Madrid: 8 June to 15 September 2002; “Alfred Sisley: poète de l'impressionnisme” - Musée des Beaux-Arts de Lyon, Lyon: 10 October 2002 to 6 January 2003.
- Sisley in England and Wales (2009) - National Gallery, London: 12 November 2008 to 22 February 2009; Amgueddfa Cymru / National Museum of Wales, Cardiff: 7 March to 14 June 2009.
- Alfred Sisley: the true Impressionist (2011–12) - "Alfred Sisley: der wahre Impressionist" Von der Heydt-Museum, Wuppertal: 13 September 2011 to 29 January 2012.
- Alfred Sisley: Impressionist Master / Sisley l’impressionsite (2017) - “Alfred Sisley: Impressionist Master” - Bruce Museum, Greenwich, Connecticut: 21 January to 21 May 2017. ; “Sisley l’impressionsite” - Centre d’Art Aix-en-Provence, Caumont, Aix-en-Provence: 10 June to 15 October 2017.

== Selected works ==
- Avenue of Chestnut Trees near La Celle-Saint-Cloud (1865)
- View of Montmartre from Cité des Fleurs to Les Batignolles (1869)
- The Bridge at Villeneuve-la-Garenne (1872)
- Ferry to the Ile-de-la-Loge – Flood (1872)
- La Grande-Rue, Argenteuil (c. 1872)
- Square in Argenteuil (Rue de la Chaussee) (1872)
- Footbridge at Argenteuil (1872)
- Chemin de la Machine, Louveciennes (1873)
- Louveciennes. Sentier de la Mi-côte (1873)
- Hampton Court Bridge (painting) (1874)
- Molesey Weir – Morning (1874)
- Regatta at Molesey (1874)
- Under Hampton Court Bridge (1874)
- The Terrace at Saint-Germain, Spring (1875)
- The Small Meadows in Spring, By (c. 1881)

== Gallery ==
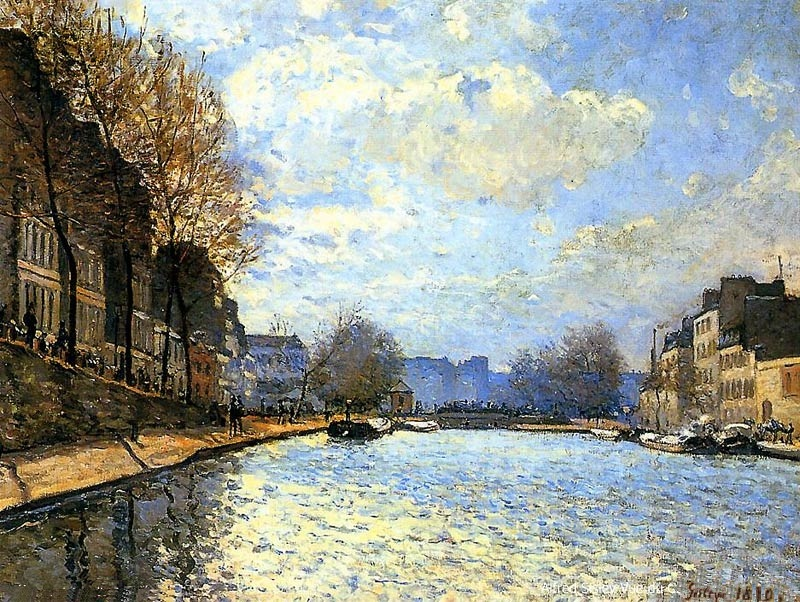
St. Martin Canal, 1870, Musée d'Orsay, Paris

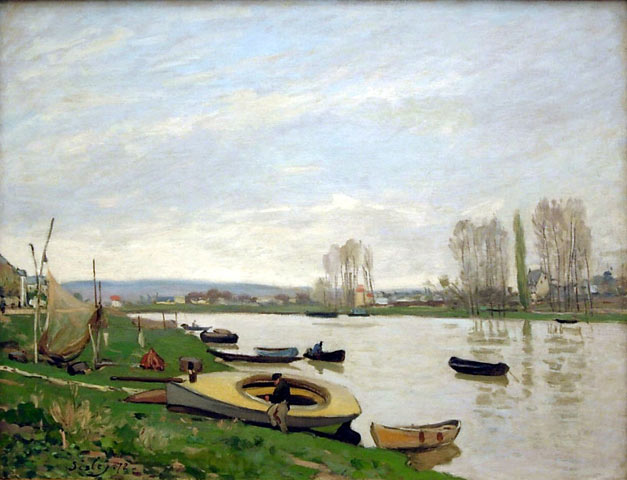
The Seine at Argenteuil, 1872, Faure Museum, Aix-les-Bains

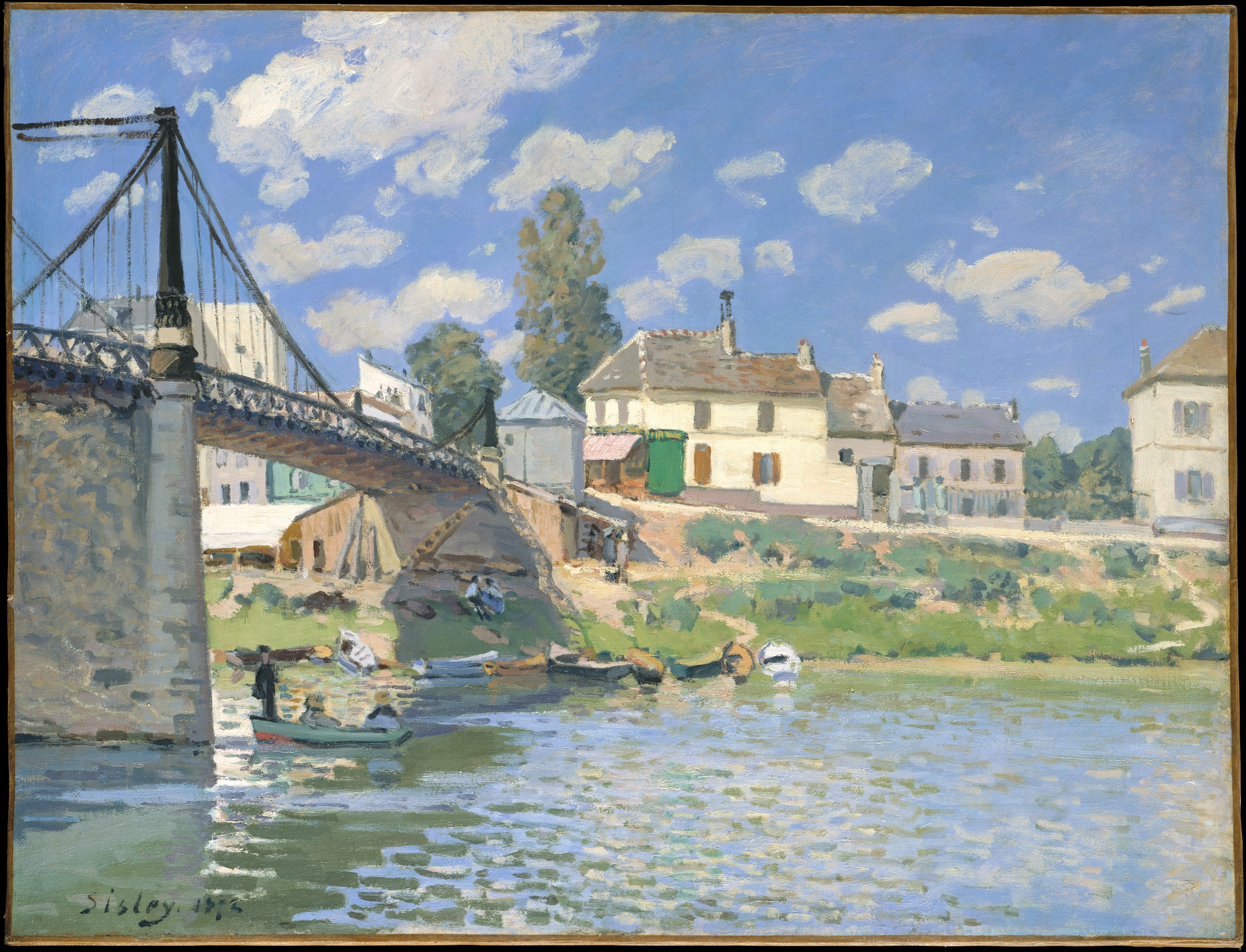
The Bridge at Villeneuve-la-Garenne, 1872, Metropolitan Museum of Art, New York City

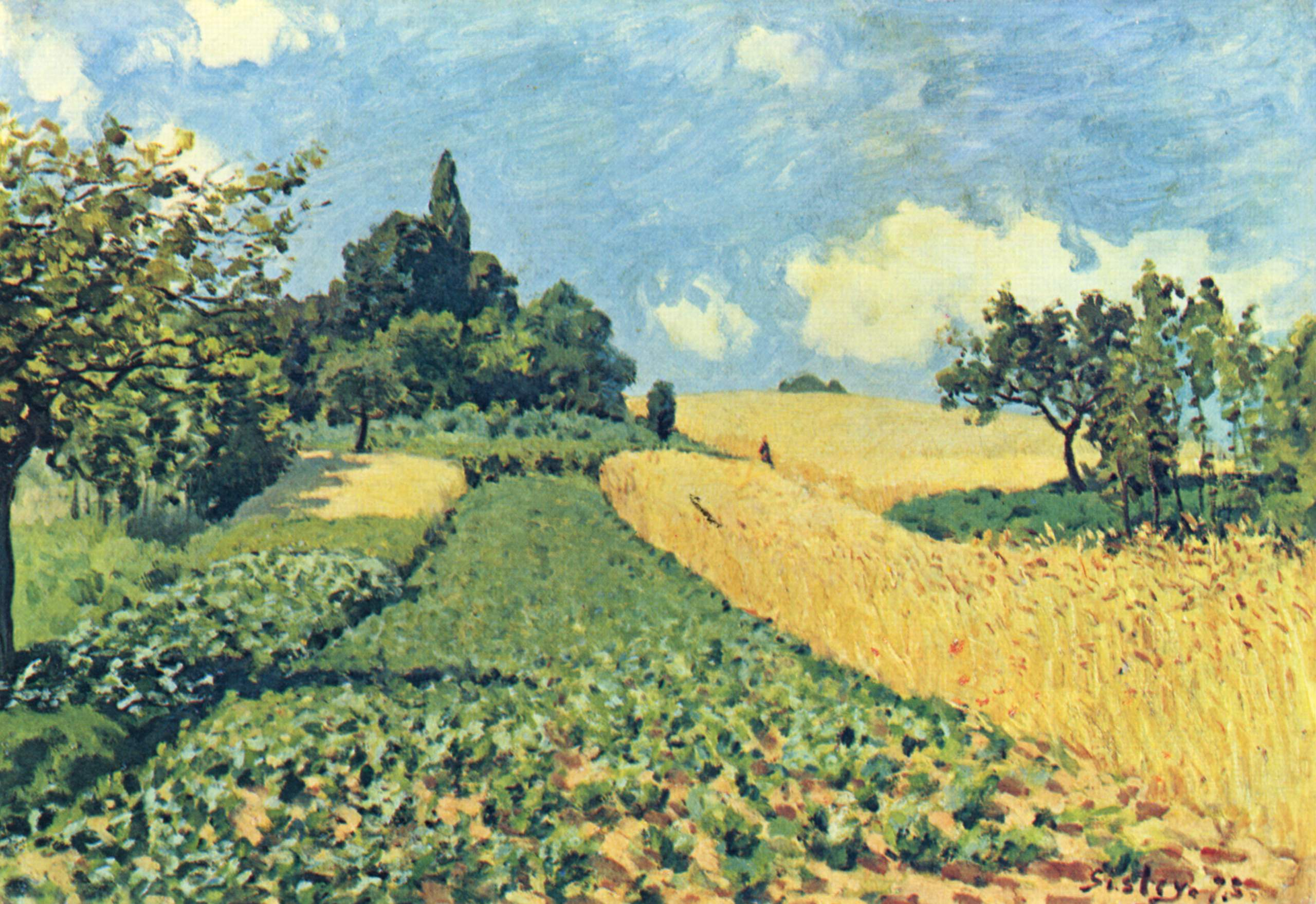
Grain fields on the hills of Argenteuil, 1873, Hamburger Kunsthalle, Hamburg

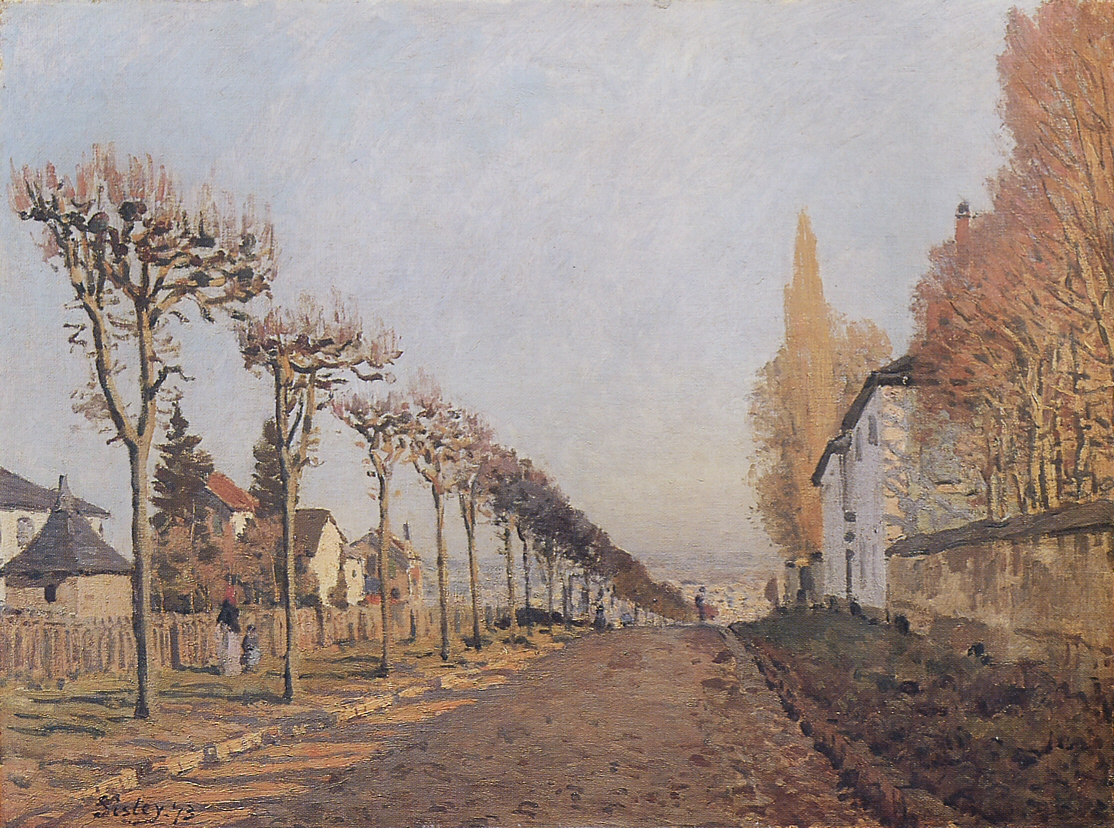
Chemin de la Machine, Louveciennes, 1873, Musée d'Orsay, Paris

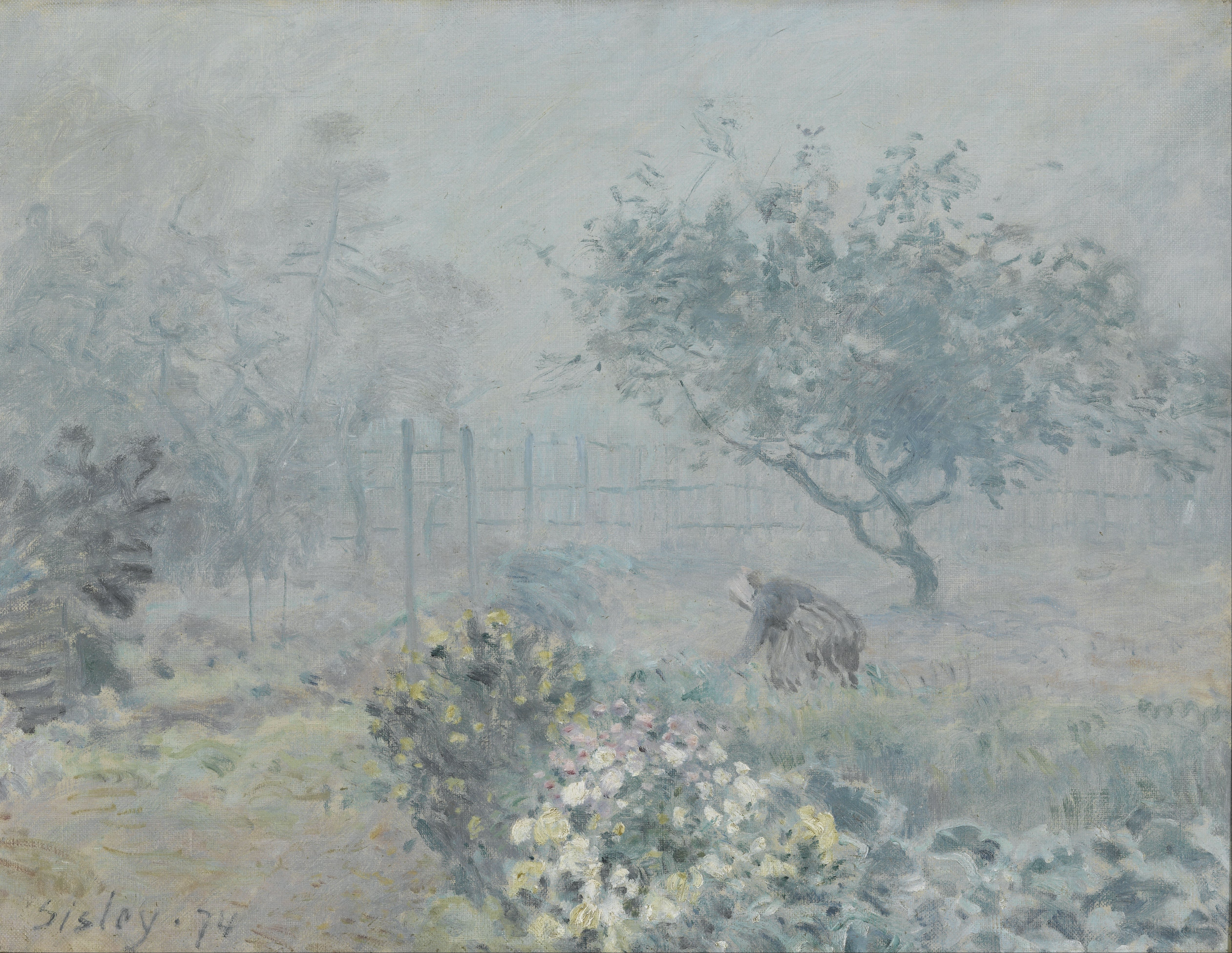
Fog, Voisins, 1874, Musée d'Orsay, Paris

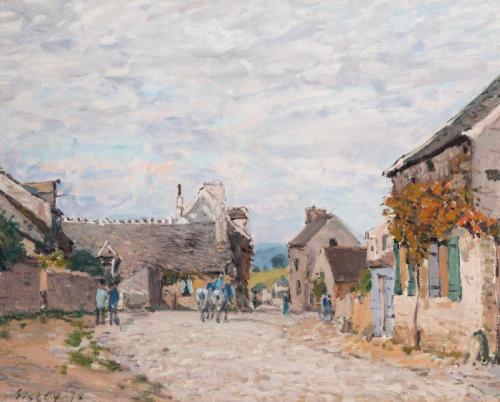
La Petite Place - La Rue du Village, 1874, Aberdeen Art Gallery

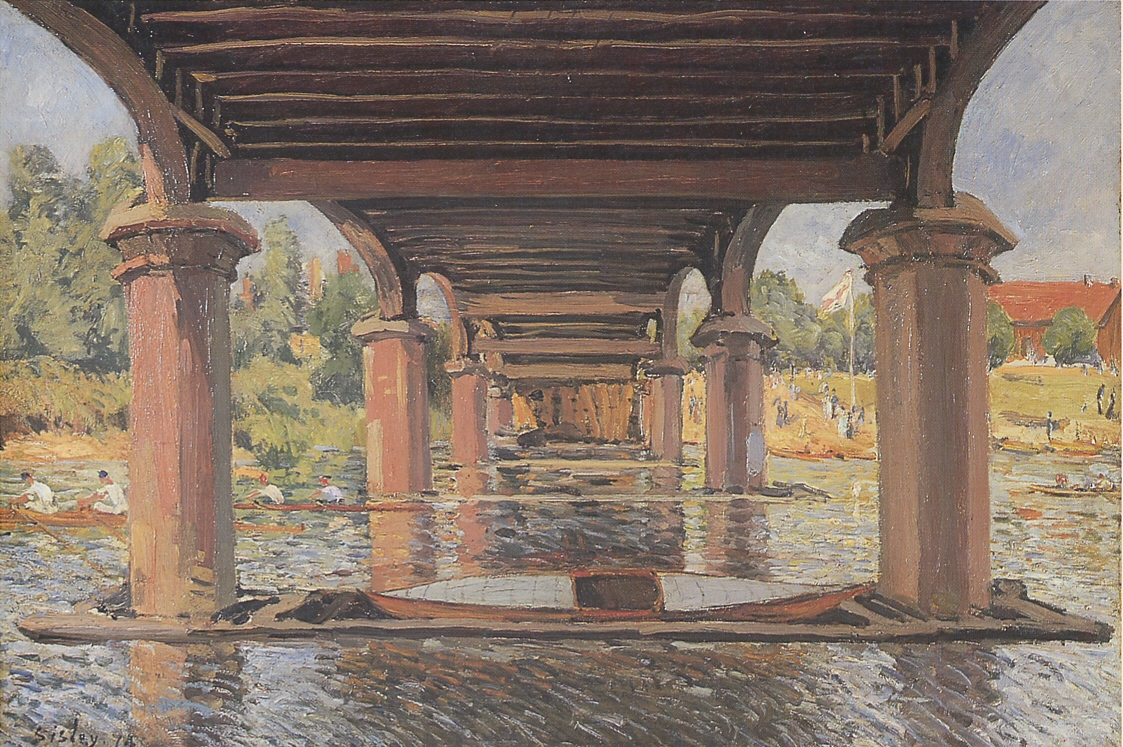
Under the Bridge at Hampton Court, 1874, Kunstmuseum Winterthur, Switzerland

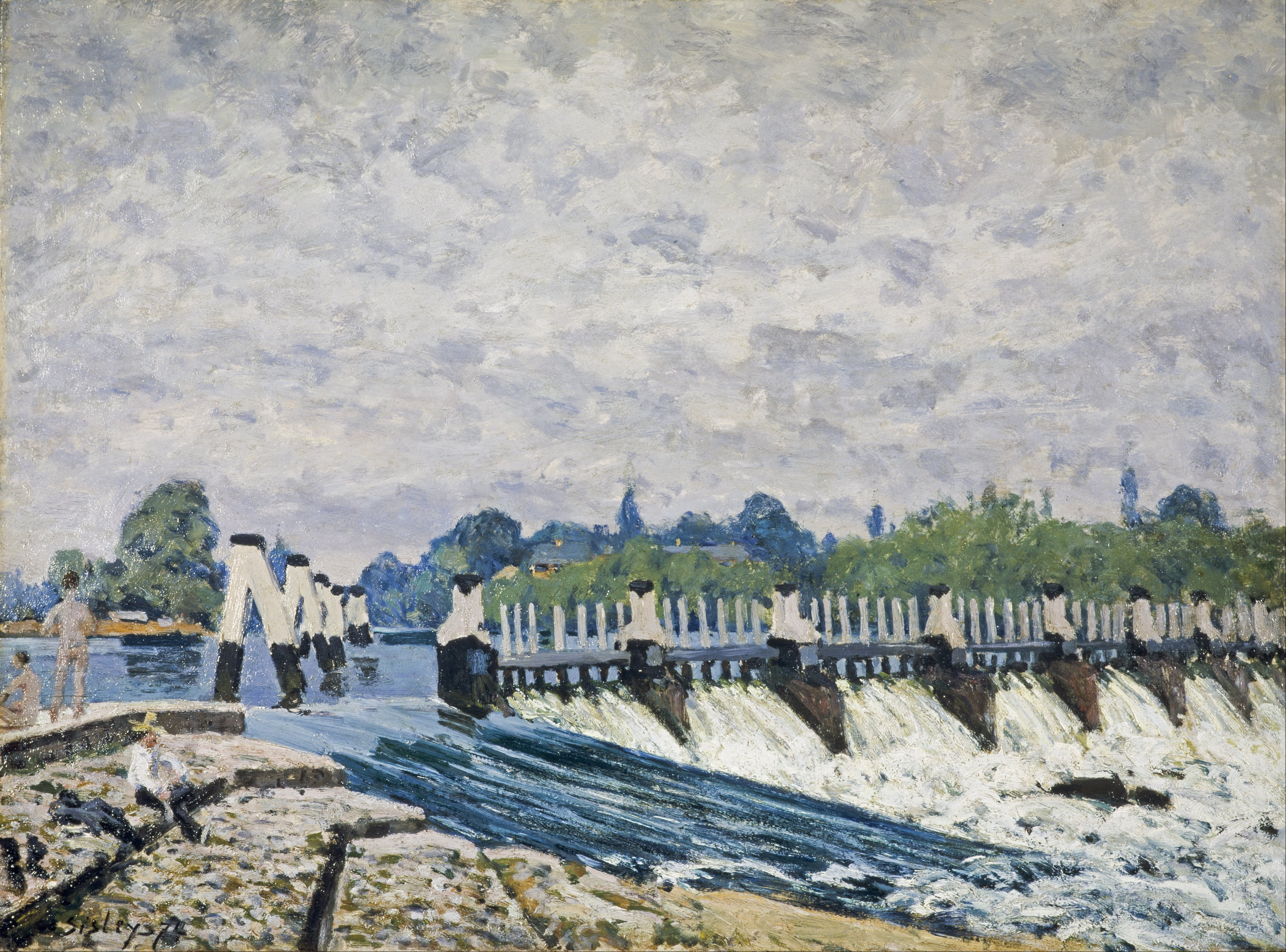
Molesey Weir – Morning, 1874

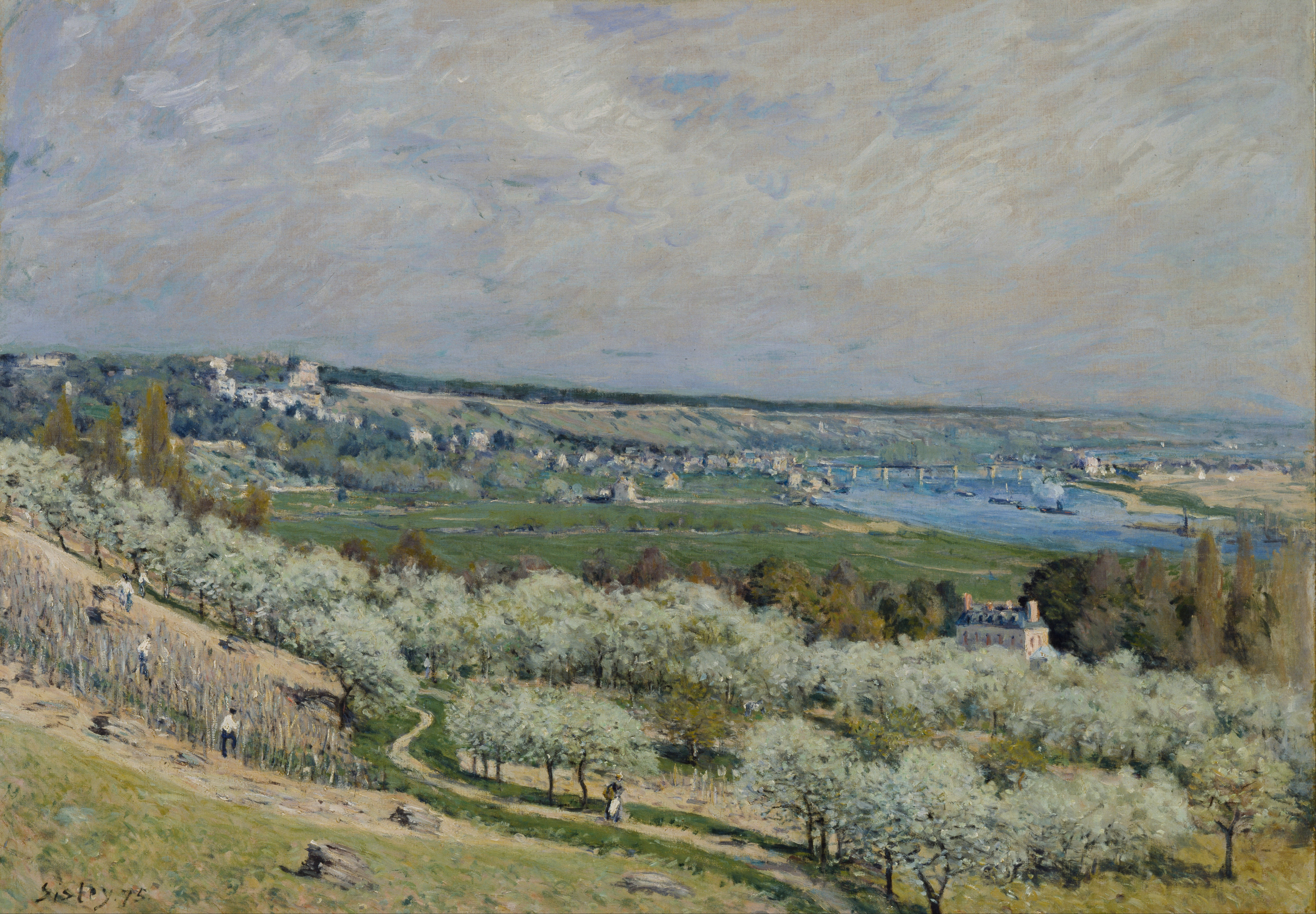
The Terrace at Saint-Germain, Spring, 1875, The Walters Art Museum, Baltimore

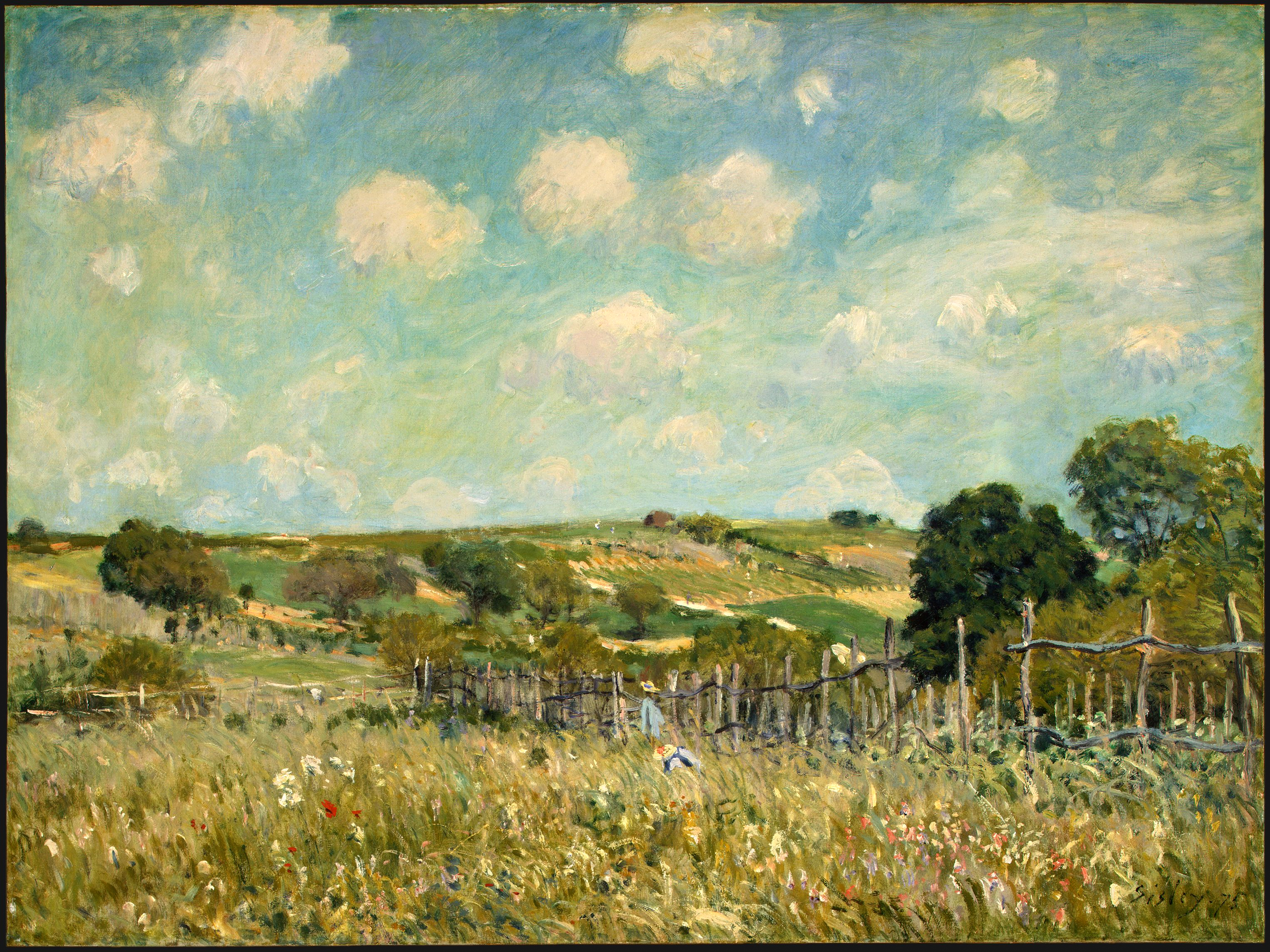
The Meadow, 1875, National Gallery of Art, Washington, D.C.

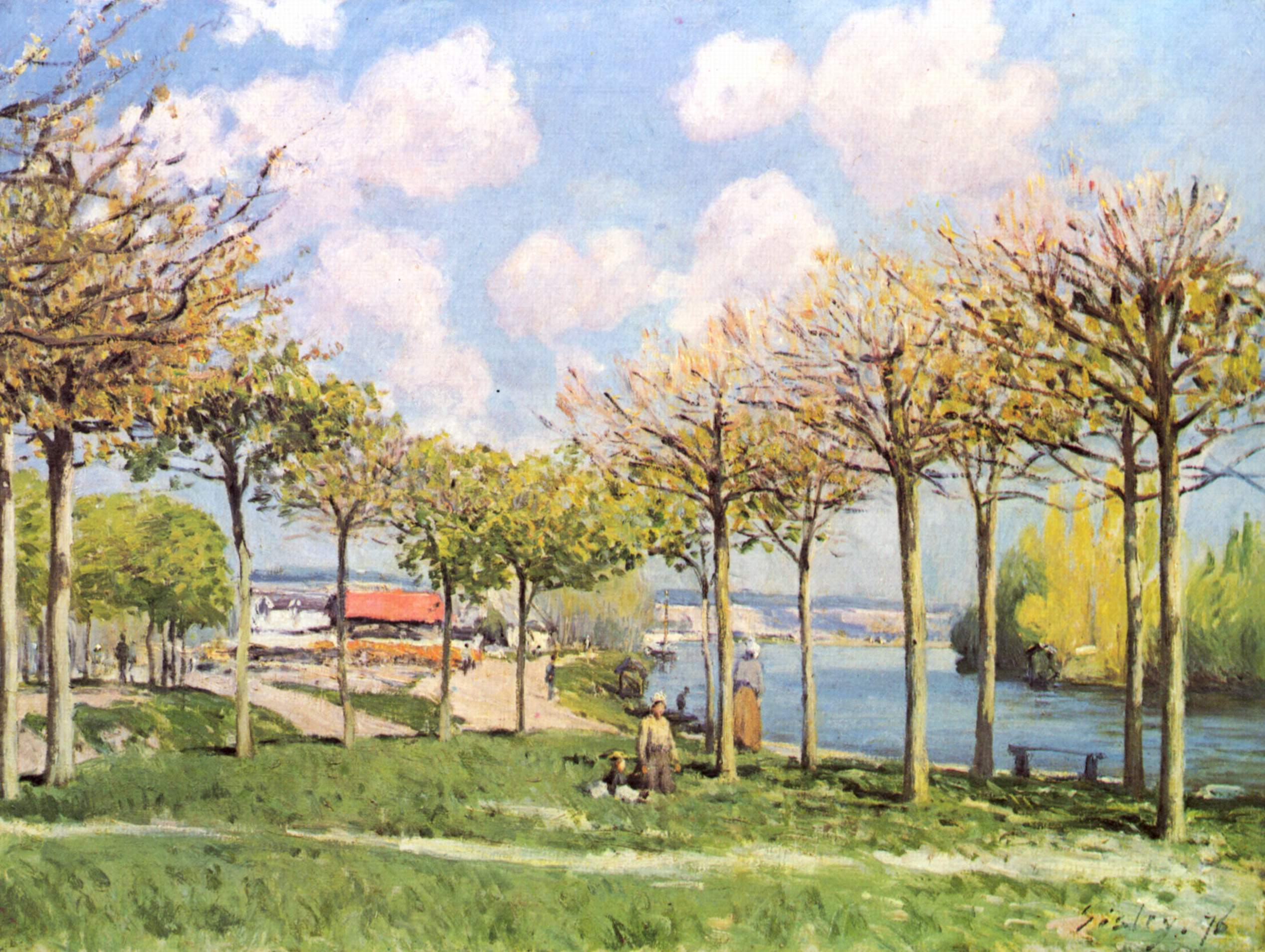
The Seine at Bougival, 1876, Metropolitan Museum of Art, New York City

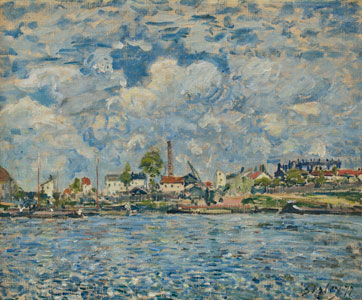
La Seine au point du jour, 1877, Musée Malraux, Le Havre

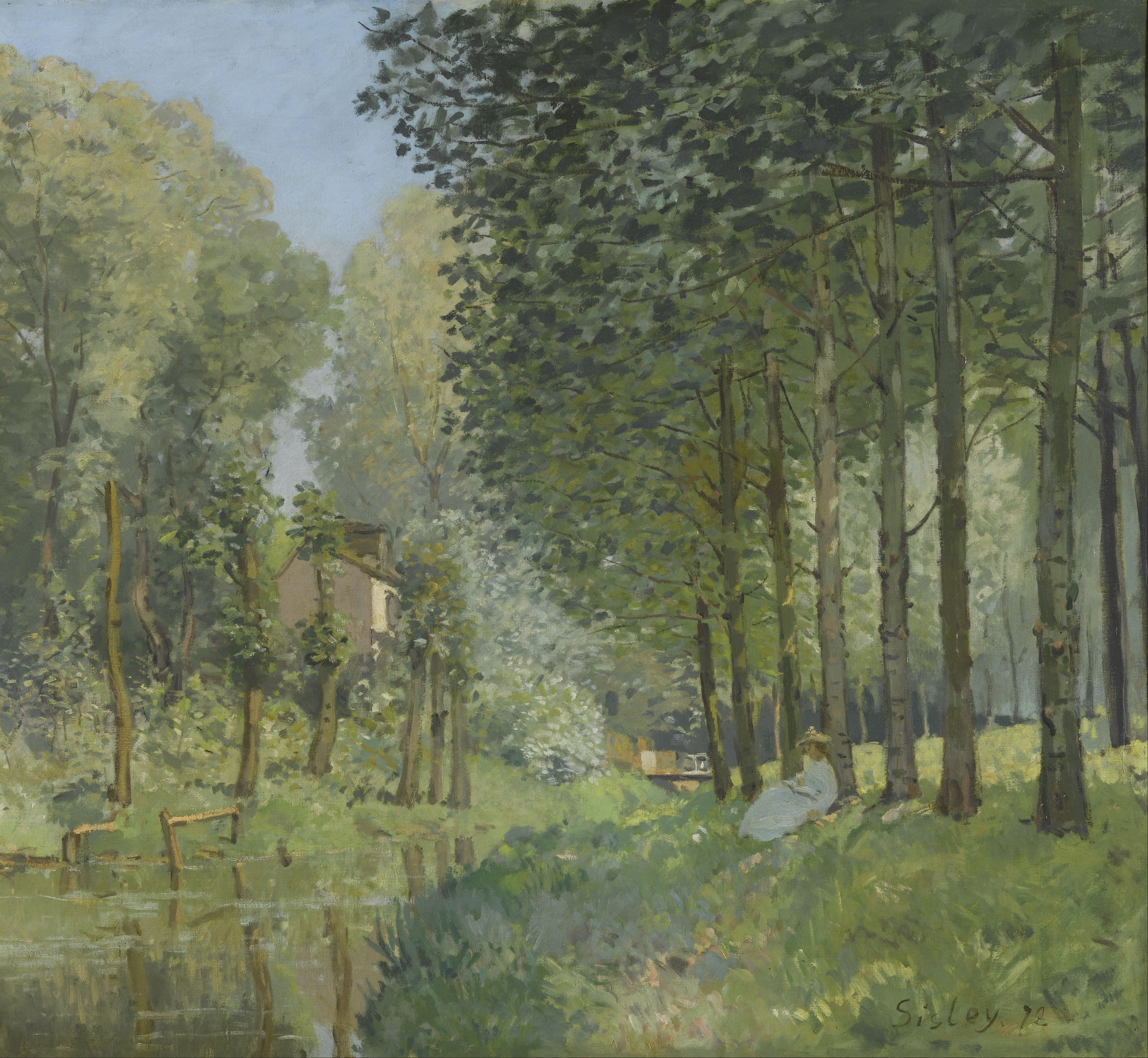
Resting by a Stream at the Edge of the Wood, 1878, Musée d'Orsay, Paris

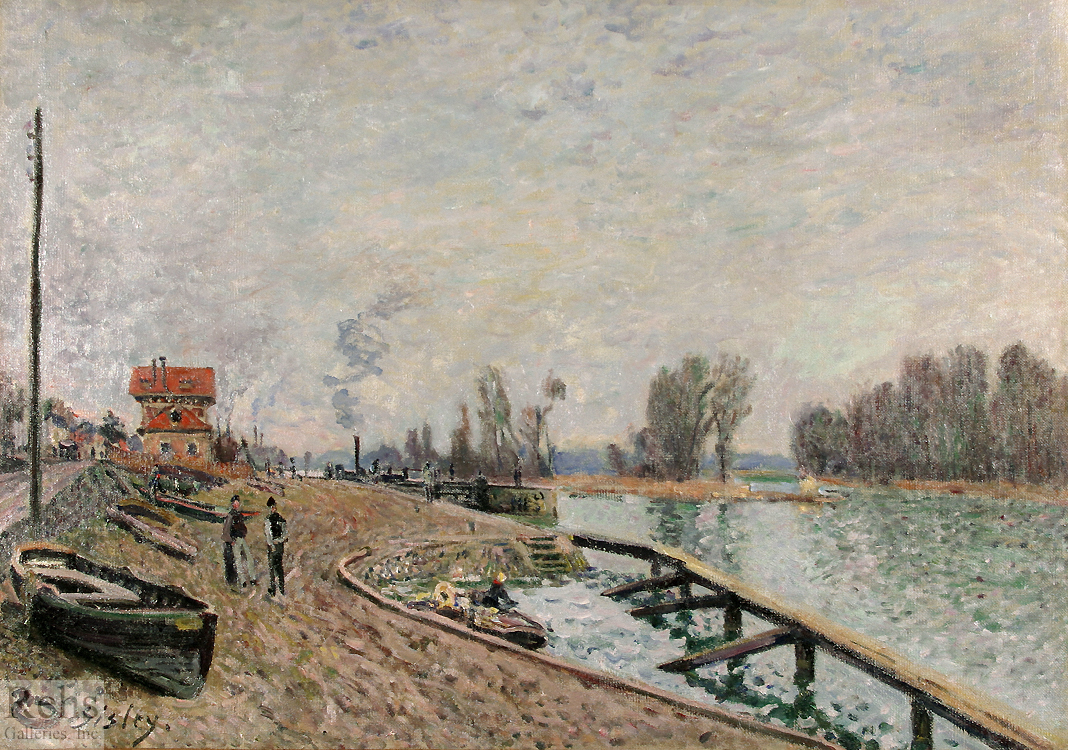
La Seine à Suresnes, 1880, Rehs Galleries, Inc., New York City

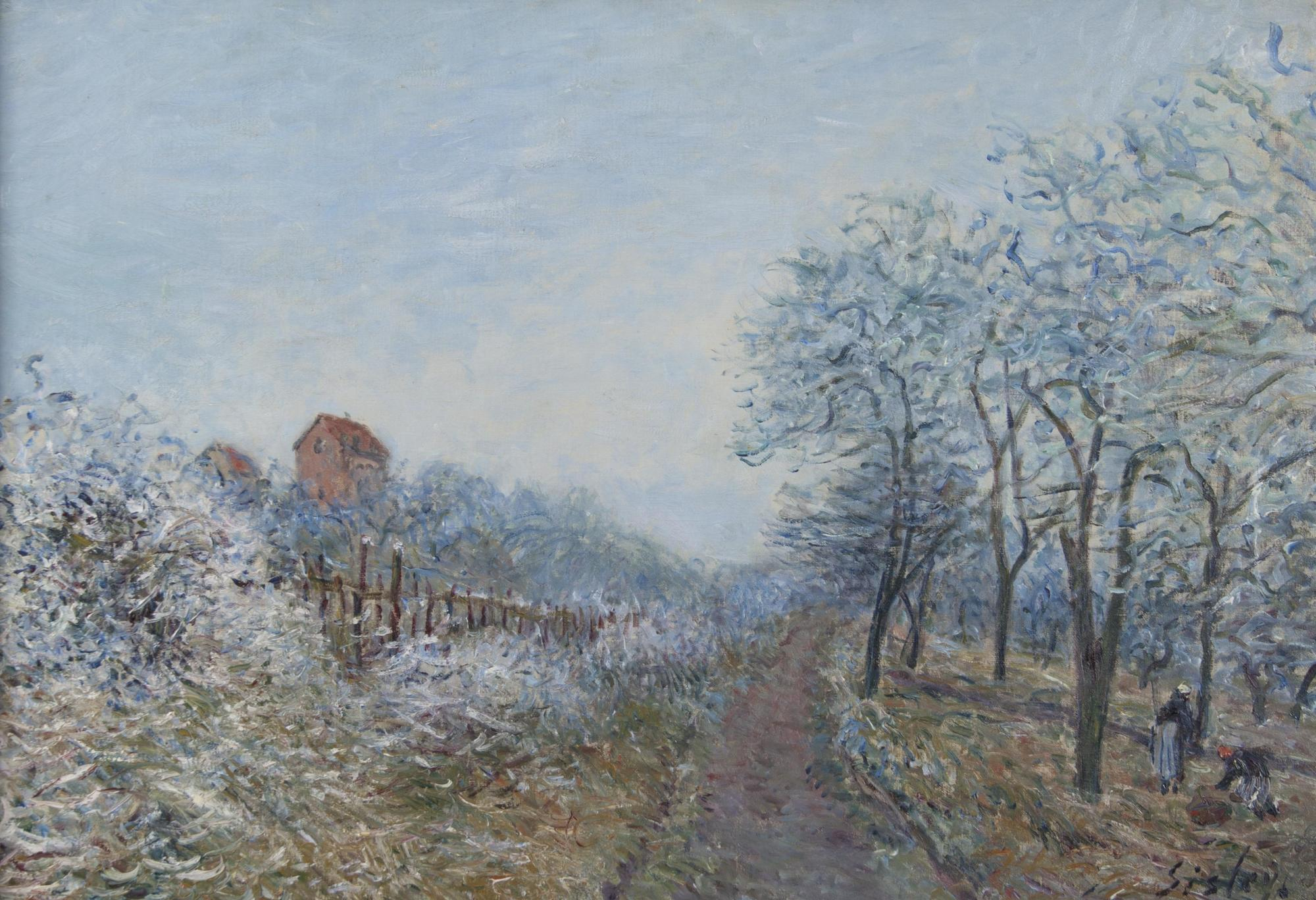
Le Givre à Veneux, 1880, University of Michigan Museum of Art, Ann Arbor

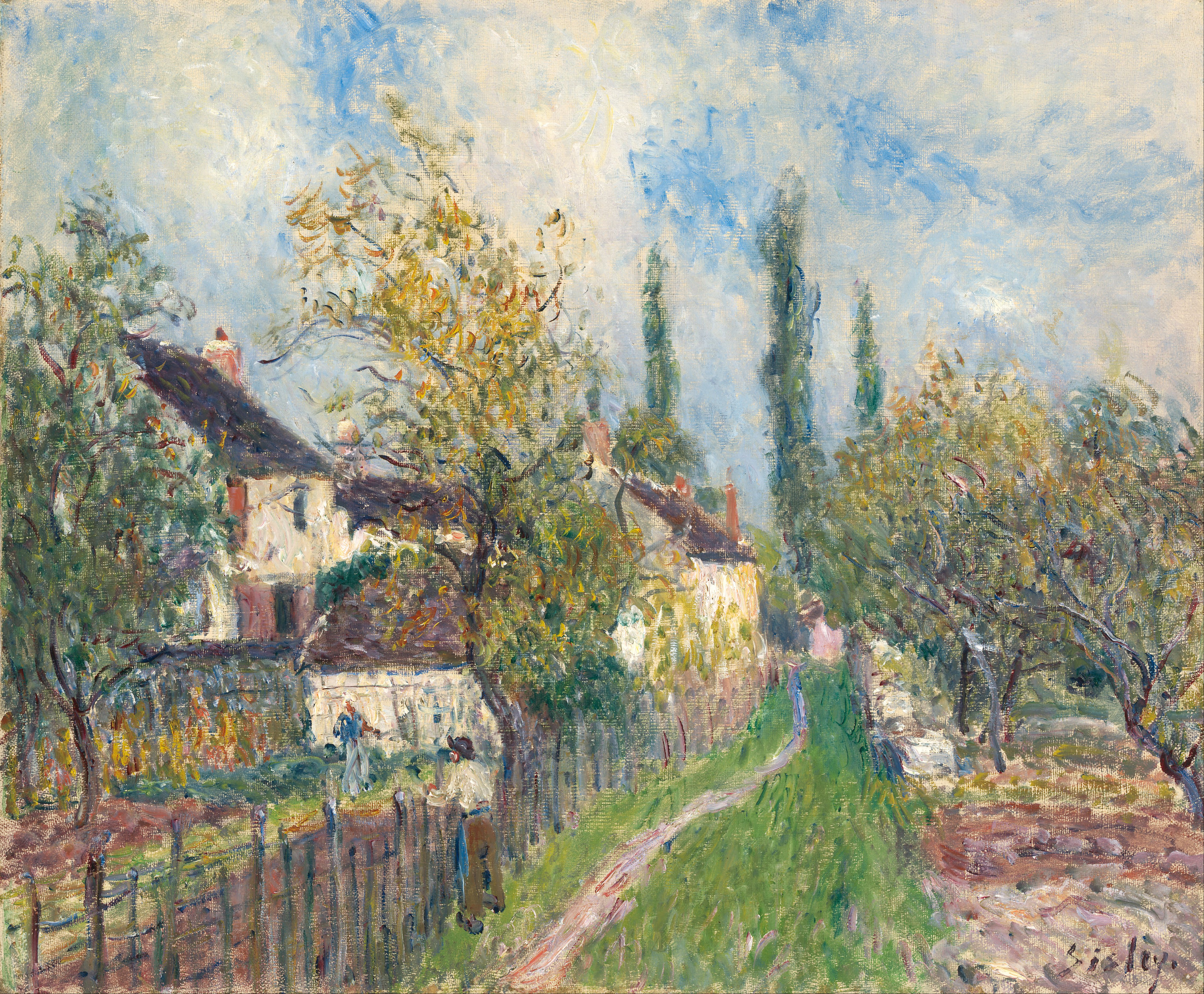
A path at Les Sablons, 1883, National Gallery of Australia, Canberra

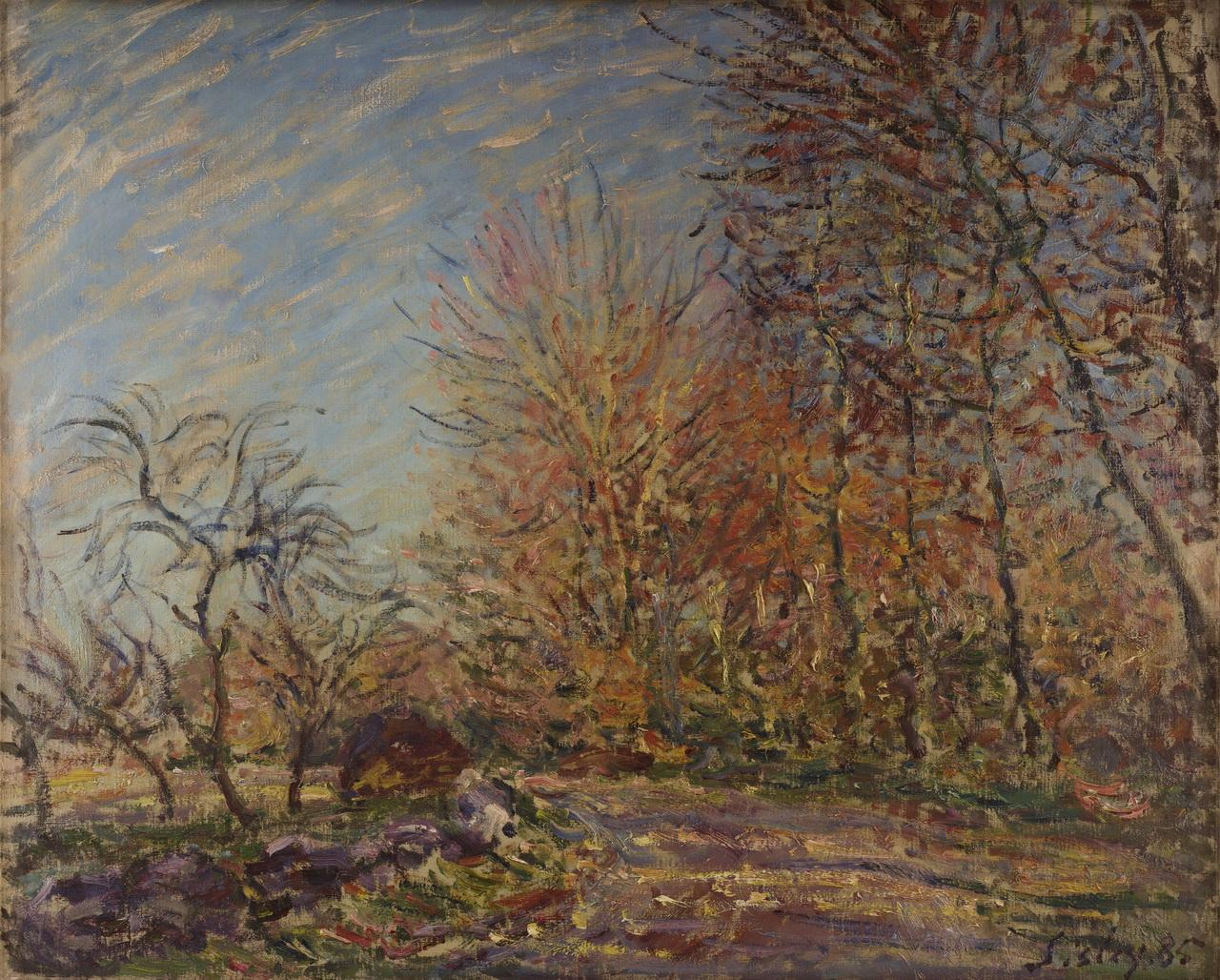
The Edge of Fontainebleau Forest, 1885, Pushkin Museum, Moscow

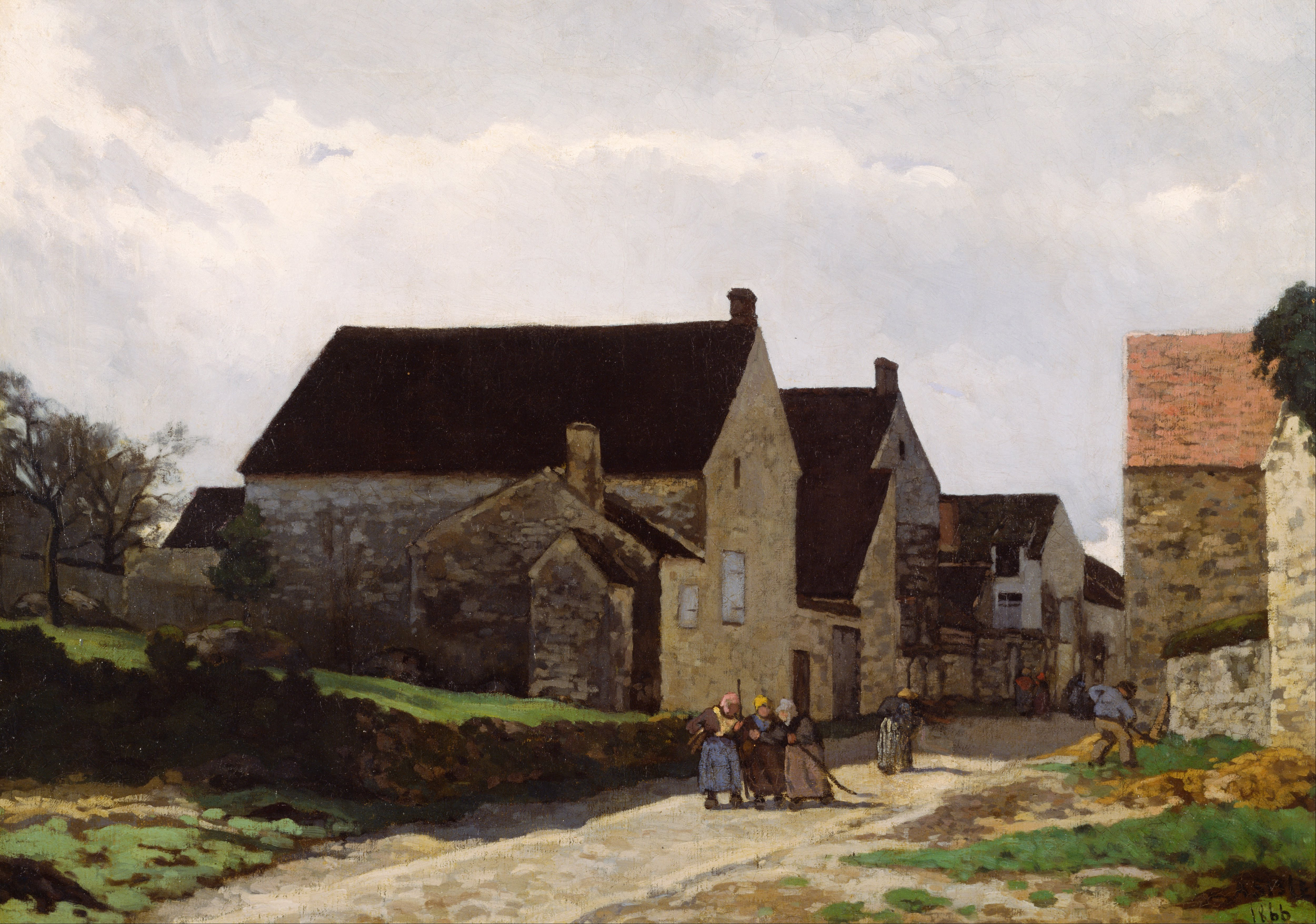
Women Going to the Woods, 1886, Artizon Museum, Tokyo

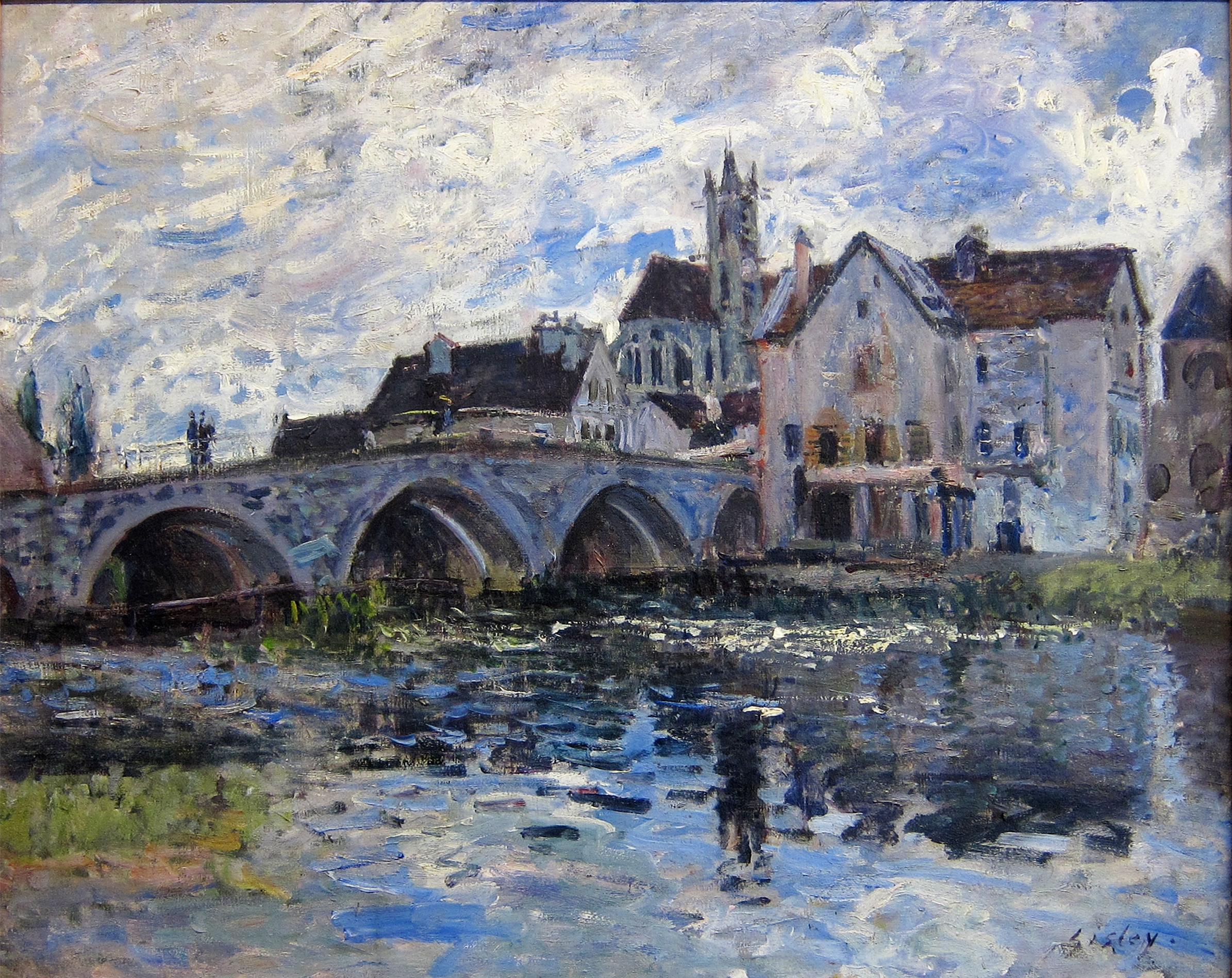
Le Pont de Moret, effet d'orage, 1887, Musée Malraux, Le Havre

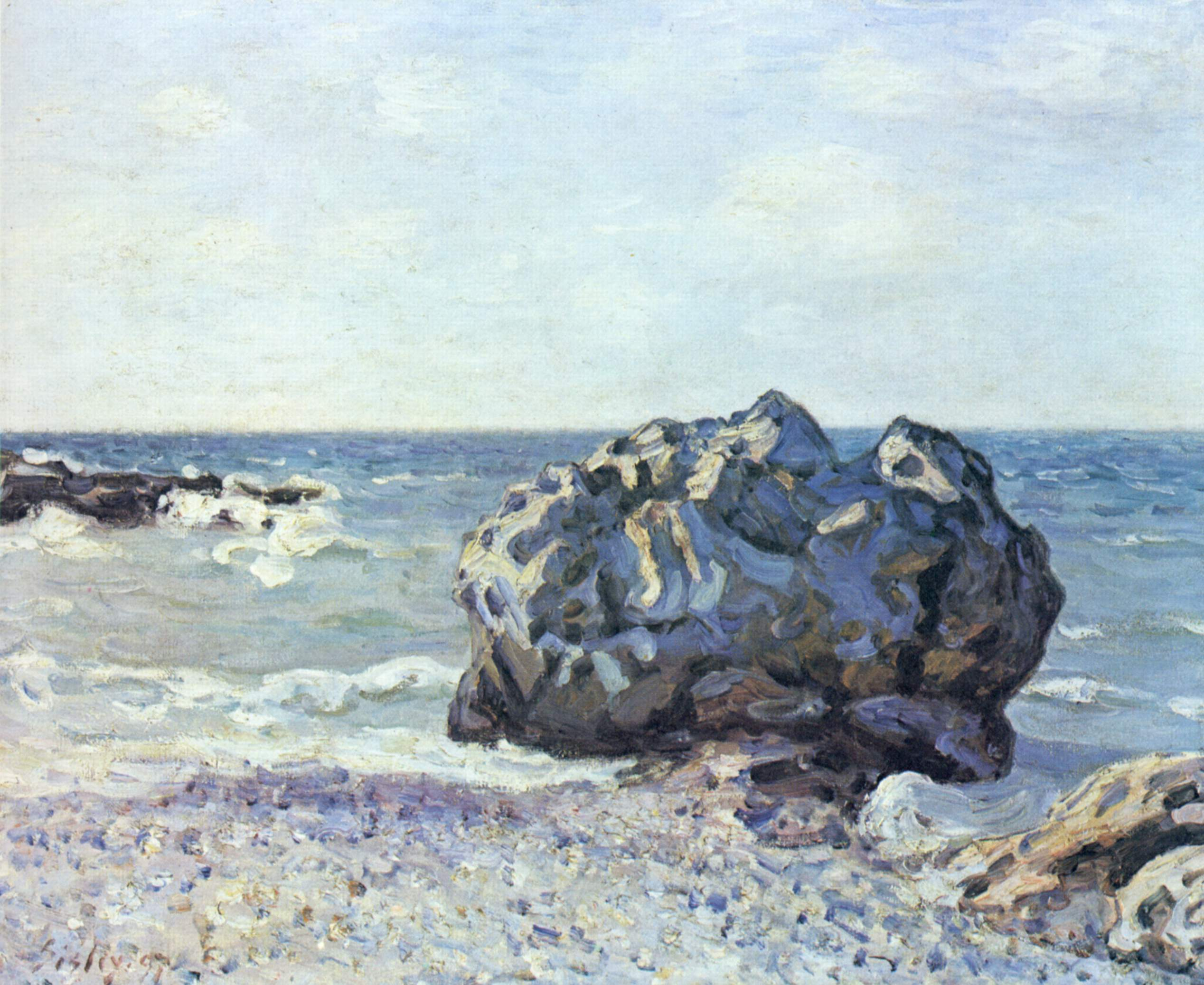
Seaside, Langland, 1887, Museum of Fine Arts Bern

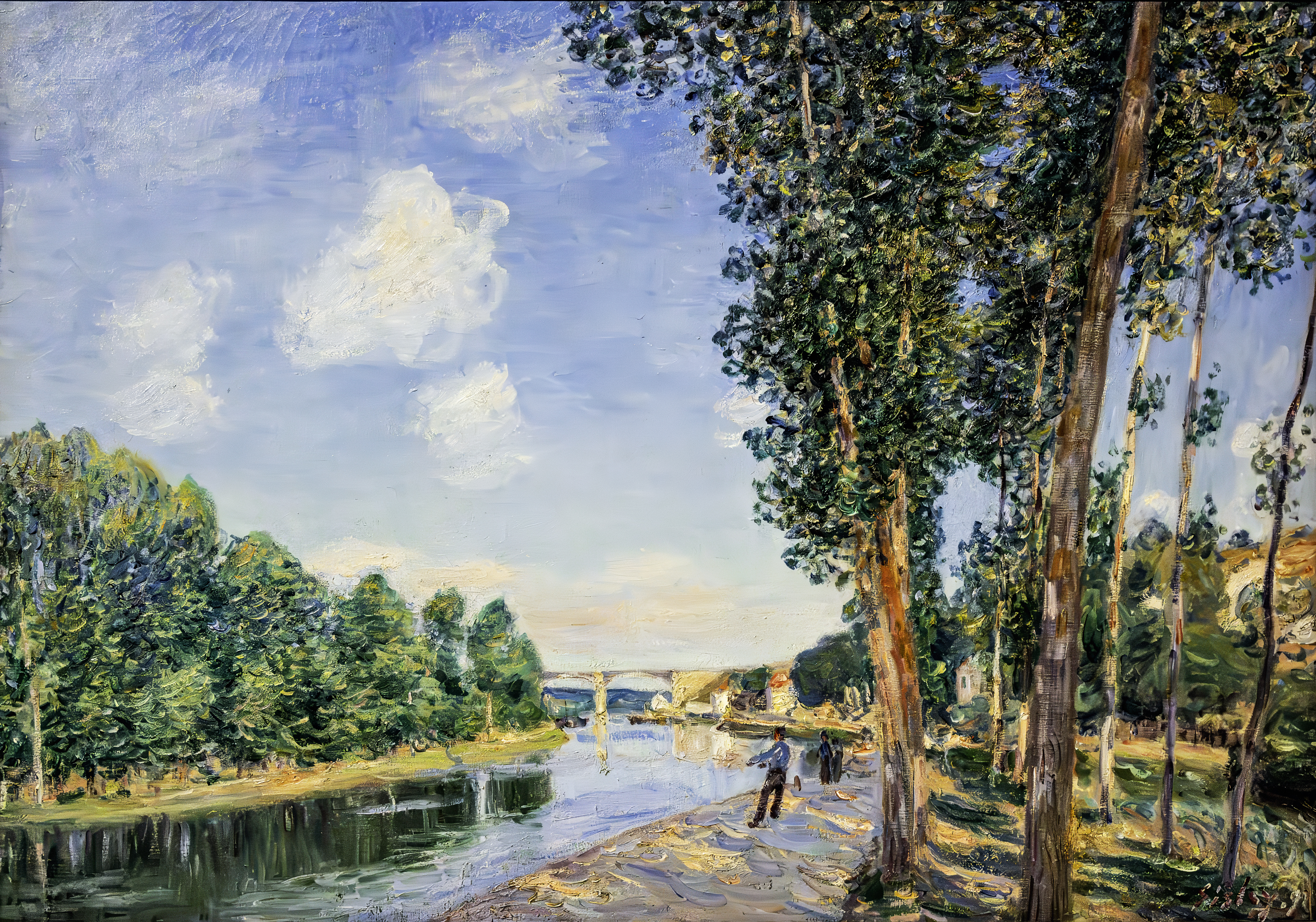
A Bend in the Loing, 1892, Museu Nacional d'Art de Catalunya, Barcelona

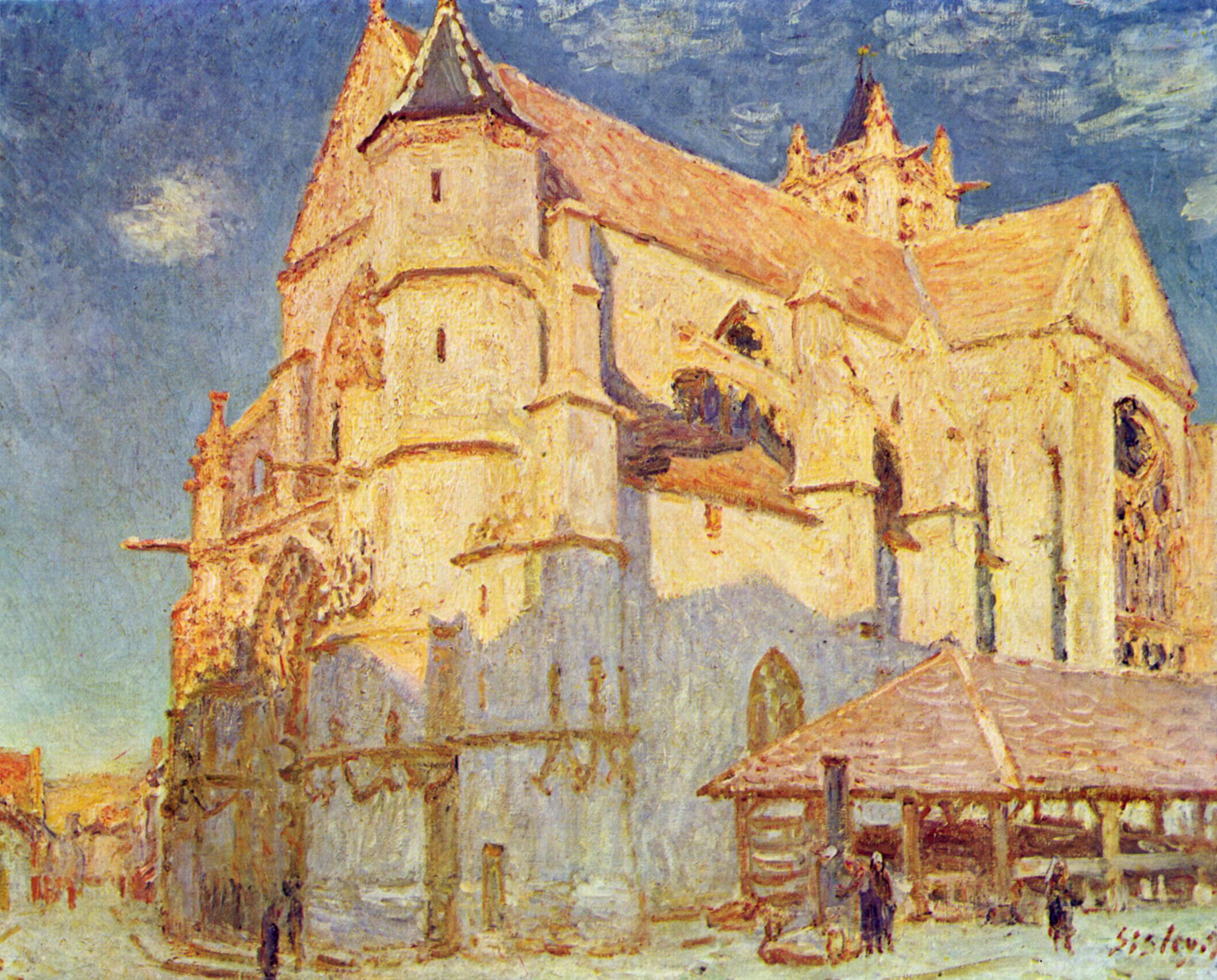
The Church at Moret in the Morning Sun, 1893, Musée des Beaux-Arts de Rouen

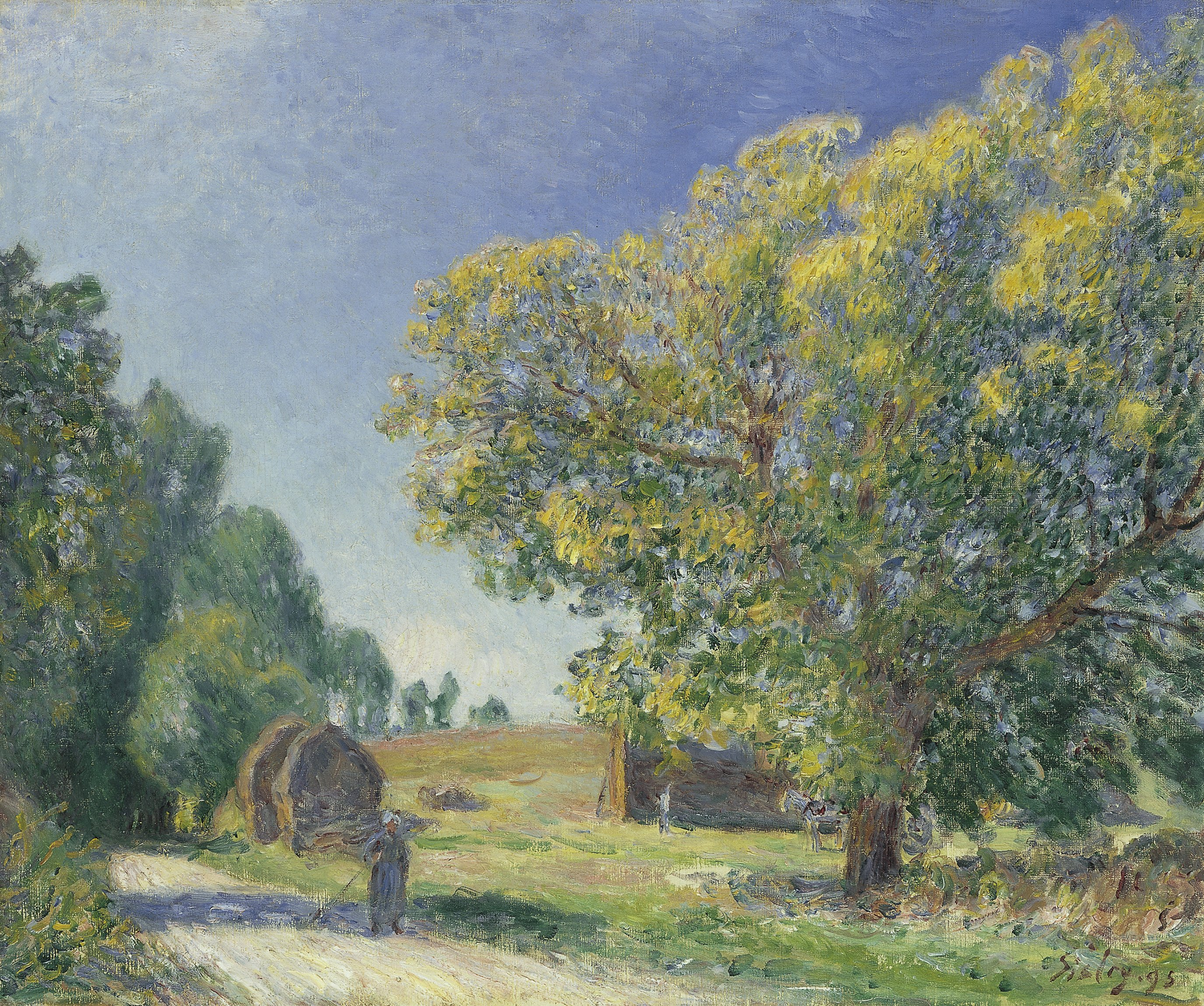
A Forest Clearing, 1895, Thyssen-Bornemisza Museum, Madrid

== Notes, references and sources ==
=== Sources ===
==== Biographies and biographical articles ====
Cogniat, Raymond (1978). Sisley (in French). Naefels, Switzerland: Bonfini. ISBN 9780517533215.

Gale, Iain (1992). Sisley. London: Studio Editions. ISBN 185170857X.

Geffroy, Gustave (1923). Sisley (in French). Paris: Cahiers d'aujourd'hui.

Romane-Musculus, Paul (July–September 1974). "Généalogie des Sisley". Bulletin de la Société de l'Histoire du Protestantisme Français (in French). 120: 458–463. JSTOR 24294236 – via JSTOR.

Shone, Richard (1992). Sisley. London: Phaidon Press. ISBN 9780714838922.

Sisley, Claude (September 1949). "The Ancestry of Alfred Sisley". The Burlington Magazine. 91 (558): 248–252. JSTOR 870068 – via JSTOR.

==== Catalogues raisonnés / critical catalogues ====
Brame, Silvie; Lorenceau, François (2021). Alfred Sisley catalogue critique des peintures et des pastels [Alfred Sisley: Critical Catalogue of Paintings and Pastels] (in French). Lausanne: La Bibliothèque des Arts, Paris; Brame & Lorenceau. ISBN 9782884532280.

Daulte, François. (1959). Alfred Sisley: catalogue raisonné de l'oeuvre peint [Alfred Sisley: Reasoned catalogue of painted work] (in French). Lausanne: Durand-Ruel.

==== Exhibition catalogues ====
Finckh, Gerhard (2011). Alfred Sisley: Der Wahre Impressionist [Alfred Sisley: the True Impressionist] (in German). Wuppertal: Von der Heydt Museum. ISBN 9783892020806.

Senzoku, Nobuyuki; Restellini, Marc (2000). Exposition Alfred Sisley (in French and Japanese). Tokyo: Art Life. OCLC 76892604.

Reed, Nicholas (2008). Sisley on the Thames and Welsh coast. Folkestone: Lilburn Press. ISBN 978-1-901167-20-7.

Riopelle, Christopher; Sumner, Ann (2008). Sisley in England and Wales. London: Yale University Press. ISBN 9781857094138.

Stevens, MaryAnne, ed. (1992). Alfred Sisley. London: Yale University Press. ISBN 9780300052442.

  - Lloyd, Christopher (1992a). "Alfred Sisley and the Purity of Vision". In Stevens, MaryAnne (ed.). Alfred Sisley. pp. 5–33.
  - Lloyd, Christopher (1992b). "Marly-le-Roi and Sèvres: 1875-1880". In Stevens, MaryAnne (ed.). Alfred Sisley. pp. 149–181.
  - Stevens, MaryAnne (1992a). "La Celle-Saint-Cloud to Louveciennes: 1865-1875". In Stevens, MaryAnne (ed.). Alfred Sisley. pp. 77–181.
  - Patin, Sylvie (1992). "Venuex-Nadon and the Moret-sur-Loing: 1880-1899". In Stevens, MaryAnne (ed.). Alfred Sisley. pp. 183–257.
  - Cahn, Isabelle [in French] (1992). "Documentary Chronology". In Stevens, MaryAnne (ed.). Alfred Sisley. pp. 259–281.

Stevens, MaryAnne; Dumas, Ann, eds. (2002). Sisley: Poeta del Impressionismo [Sisley: Poet of Impressionism] (in Spanish). Madrid: Fundación Colección Thyssen-Bornemisza. ISBN 9788488474889.

Stevens, MaryAnne, ed. (2017). Alfred Sisley: Impressionist Master. London: Yale University Press. ISBN 9780300215571.

  - Shone, Richard (2017). "Between the Sky and the Water: Reflections on Alfred Sisley". In Stevens, MaryAnne (ed.). Alfred Sisley: Impressionist Master. London. pp. 21–31.
  - Stevens, MaryAnne (2017a). "'A Very Personal Impressionist': Alfred Sisley and his milieu". In Stevens, MaryAnne (ed.). Alfred Sisley: Impressionist Master. London. pp. 33–53.

Tucker, Paul Hayes (2000). The Impressionists at Argenteuil. New Haven: Yale University Press. ISBN 0300083491.

==== General histories ====
Bomford, David; Kirby, Jo; Leighton, John; Roy, Ashok; White, Raymond (1990). Impressionism. London: National Gallery. ISBN 9780300050356.

Denvir, Bernard (2000). The Chronicle of Impressionism: an intimate diary of the lives and world of the great artists. London: Thames Hudson. ISBN 0500282145.

Distel, Anne (1990). Impressionism: the first collectors. New York: H.N. Abrams. ISBN 0810931605.

Duret, Theodore (1919). Histoire des peintres impressionnistes: Pissarro, Claude Monet, Sisley, Renoir, Berthe Morisot, Cezanne, Guillaumin (in French). Paris: H. Floury.

Poulet, Anne L.; Murphy, Alexandra R. (1979). Corot to Braque: French Paintings from the Museum of Fine Arts, Boston. Boston: Museum of Fine Arts Boston. ISBN 0-87846-134-5.

Rewald, John (1973). The History of Impressionism (4th ed.). New York: Museum of Modern Art.

Rosenblum, Robert (1979). Paintings in the Musée d'Orsay. New York: Stewart, Tabori & Chang. ISBN 1-55670-099-7.

Turner, Jane (2000). From Monet to Cézanne: late 19th-century French artists (Grove Dictionary of Art). New York: Grove. ISBN 0-312-22971-2.

White, Barbara Ehrlich (1996). Impressionists side by side: their friendships, rivalries, and artistic exchanges. New York: Alfred A. Knopf. ISBN 0679443177.
