= Interior, after Dinner =

1868–1869 painting by Claude Monet

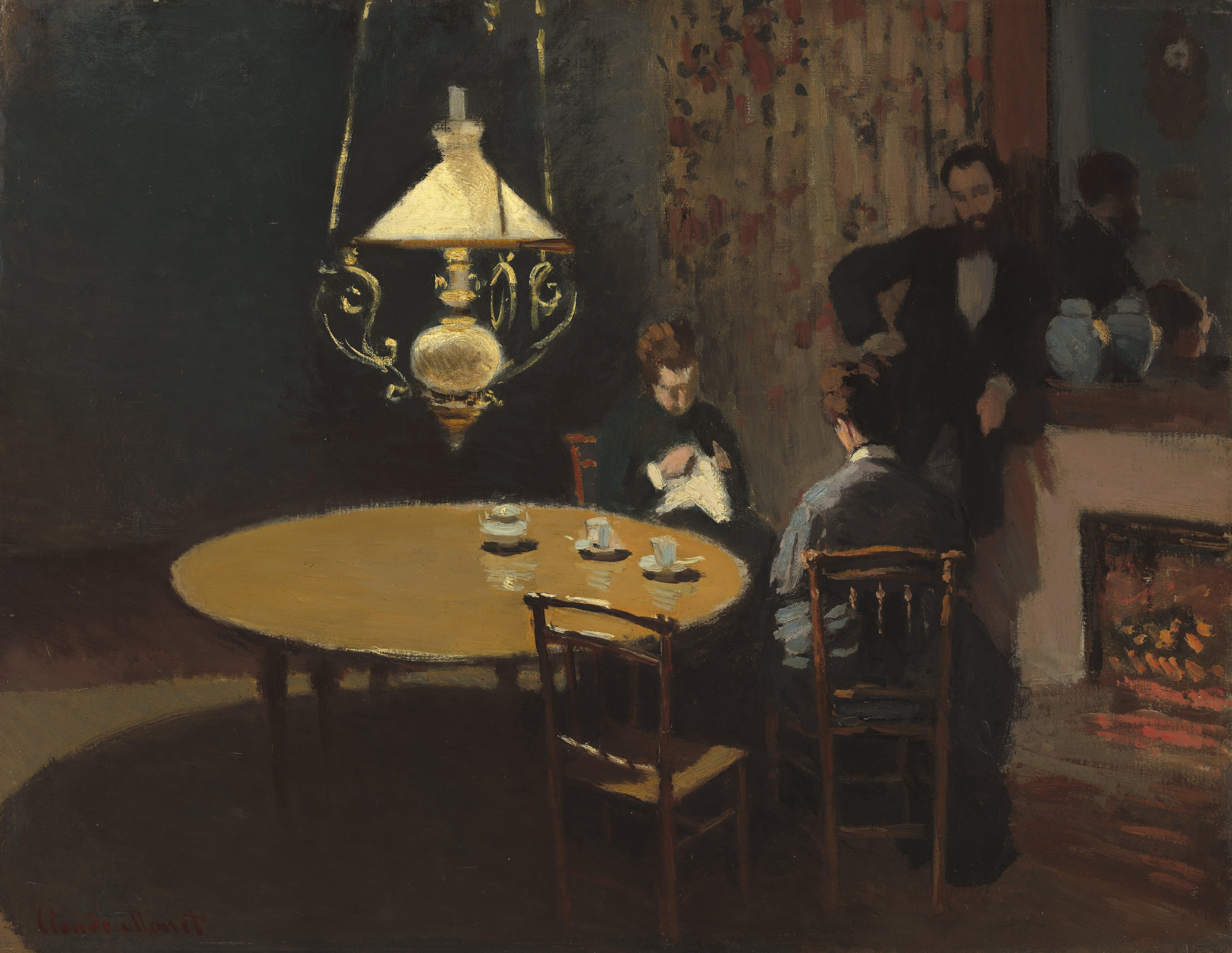
- Artist: Claude Monet
- Year: 1868–1869
- Medium: Oil on canvas
- Dimensions: 50.2 cm × 65.4 cm (19.8 in × 25.7 in)
- Location: National Gallery of Art; Washington, D.C.

Interior, after Dinner (French: Intérieur, Après dîner) is an oil-on-canvas painting by French artist Claude Monet (1840–1926) created during the winter of 1868–1869, a productive time for the painter. He spent the winter in Étretat with his girlfriend Camille Doncieux and their newborn son.

== Background ==
Monet created a series of marine paintings at this time (Fishing Boats, Calm Sea; Voiliers en mer; Fishing Boats at Sea; Rough Sea at Etretat) followed by The Magpie (1868), his famous winter masterpiece. Interior, after Dinner, which takes place later in the night, is a companion piece to The Dinner (Le Dîner) which shows the same event earlier in the evening. These are the only two interior night paintings in Monet's entire work and may have served as a study for The Luncheon (1868).

== Description ==
The painting shows two women seated at a table and a man standing. Camille Doncieux has been positively identified in the gray gown, appearing a year before she and Monet were to be married. It is unclear who the other two people might be. Marie-Louise Adelaide-Eugenie Sisley, the future wife of Alfred Sisley (1839–1899), and Sisley himself are said to possibly appear seated in The Dinner. However, this becomes less clear in the companion piece of Interior, after Dinner. The man standing near the fireplace mantle could be Monet's friend Frédéric Bazille (1841–1870).

== Critical reception ==
Art historian Hollis Clayson writes that the painting is "an exemplary naturalist nighttime interior in its quiet assessment of the subtleties of diffuse lamplight (from a ceiling oil lamp) plus firelight in the context of a quiet social gathering."

== Gallery ==
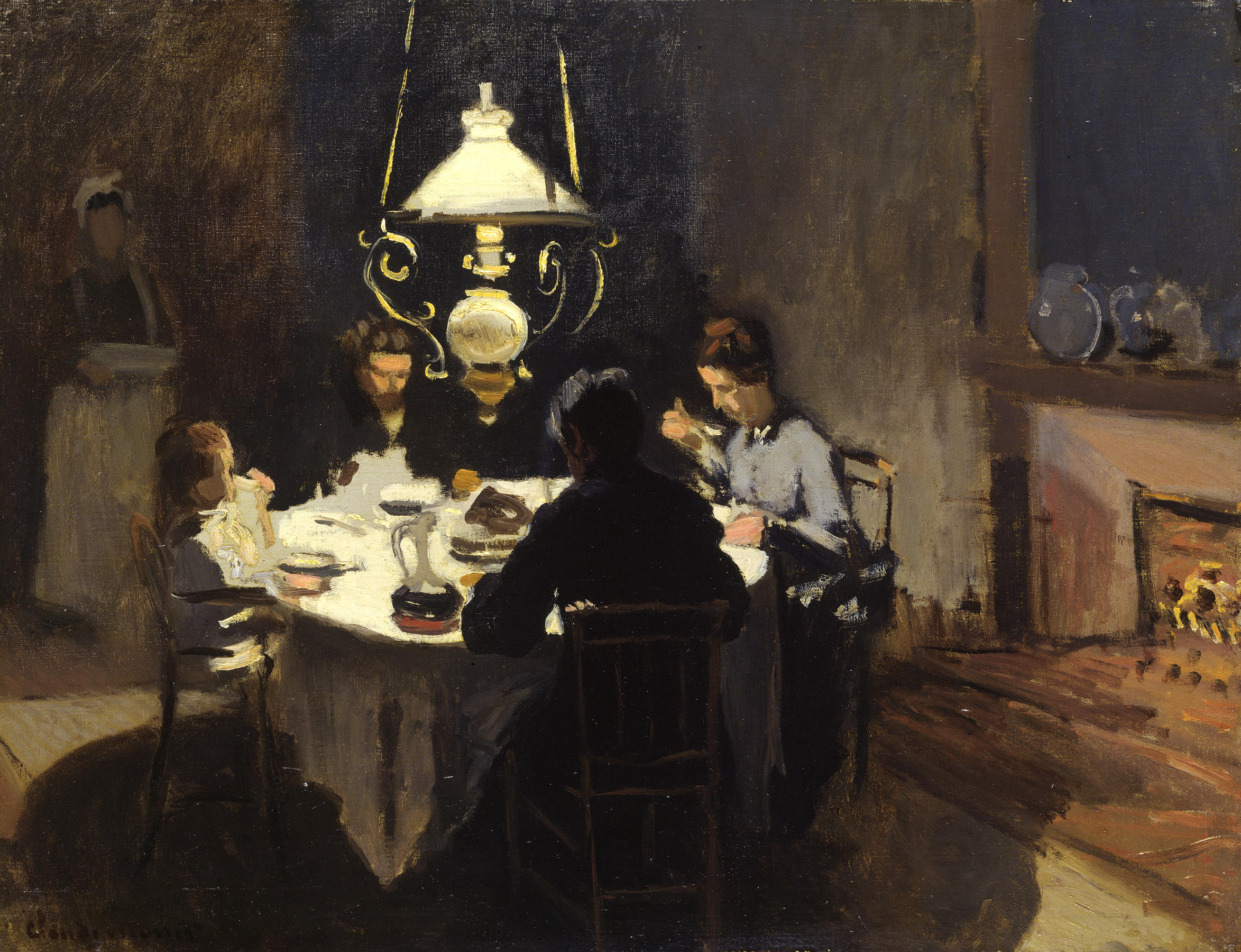
The Dinner (1868–1869), Foundation E. G. Bührle

== See also ==
- List of paintings by Claude Monet
