= Art dans Tout =

French art group from 1896 to 1901

The Art dans Tout movement was a French art group which operated from 1896 to 1901. Originally called Les Cinq, because it had five founder members, artist and lace designer Félix Aubert, sculptor and craftsman Alexandre Charpentier, sculptor and medalist Jean Dampt, sculptor and medalist Henry Nocq and architect Charles Plumet, it later changed its name to Les Six when Nocq left the group in 1897, replaced by painter Étienne Moreau-Nélaton and architect and decorator Tony Selmersheim. In 1898, the group expanded further to become Art dans Tout when Carl-Albert Angst, a sculptor and student of Dampt, Jules Desbois, a sculptor, Paul Follot, a furniture designer, Alphonse Hérold, a cabinetmaker, Antoine Jorrand, a painter and tapestry designer, Henri Sauvage, an architect, and Louis Sorrel, an architect and collaborator of Aubert's, joined. The group dissolved in 1901 due to commercial necessity.

The group's philosophy can be summed up in two concepts, that the form of a work of art should always fit its function and be artistic, and that the material the work is made from should always reflect the purpose of the object and the nature of the material.

== Historical context ==
With the rise of machine production, the cost of producing objets d'art and house decorations fell. In France, as around the rest of Europe, differing philosophies arose as to how to produce beautiful household objects and furniture for the masses, not just for the rich, following the philosophy of Eugène-Émmanuel Viollet-le-Duc. Followers of Viollet-le-Duc believed that banal, mediocre interiors had a negative effect on the development, morality and intellect of people who lived in them. Various attempts at collaborations between artists and industries that produced these items occurred. In France, these attempts had mostly ended in failure. Several of the artists in the group worked in a style that was part of the larger Art Nouveau style. The group was part of a tentative but determined attempt to break down the barriers between art, industry and everyday life.

Nocq in his role as art critic wrote an article on improvements in street design seen in England and Belgium, and encouraged France to follow their lead.

== Les Cinq ==
Les Cinq originally came together in Autumn 1896, meeting in Charpentier's workshop on Sunday afternoons. Their first exhibition was held from December 1896 - January 1897 at the Galerie des Artistes Modernes. In their preface to the exhibition catalogue of the first exhibition, the group set forth their philosophy of bringing together the major arts (painting, sculpture and architecture) and the minor arts (ceramics, furniture and decorative objects), and to produce objects that served both functional and decorative purposes. They also exhibited a furnished boudoir for the Salon de la Société Nationale des Beaux-Arts. In this room, Aubert designed the wall-hangings, curtains, carpet and fabric decorations, Charpentier the window-sash bolt and bottle-stoppers and Plumet, the dressing table, chair, shelf-unit, glass display case and the structure of the screens.

== Les Six ==
In December 1897, the group enlarged to become Les Six. In their 1897-1898 exhibition, Aubert and Charpentier designed a bathroom with the decorator Eugène Simas, which fulfilled the group's ideals of bringing beauty to an object that served a functional purpose, and was also part of an industrial collaboration, with the Sarreguemines factory.

== Art dans Tout ==
The group expanded further in 1898 to include members that could not always attend the Sunday meetings. The group planned to construct and furnish an entire house for the 1900 International Exhibition in Paris, but could not accomplish this due to a lack of funding. An Aubert and Charpentier-designed bedroom (for Prince Alexandre de Chimay and his wife) was part of the group's 1899 exhibition at the Galerie des Artistes Modernes. Members of the group collaborated with Léon Bénouville and Édmond Socard in designing the interiors of other Parisian houses. Sorrel designed a pavilion for the International Exhibition of 1900 which Aubert decorated.

== Post-group activities ==
Although the group disbanded in 1901 due to financial issues, and an inability to convince major furniture manufacturers to use their designs, several group members continued to collaborate, notably Plumet and Selmersheim.

== See also ==
- William Morris
- Arts and Crafts movement
- John Ruskin
