= Félix Aubert =

French artist

Félix Albert Anthyme Aubert (24 May 1866 – 1940) was a French artist who was part of the decorative arts group Les Cinq with Alexandre Charpentier, Tony Selmersheim, Jean Dampt and Étienne Moreau-Nélaton, which later expanded to become the Art dans Tout movement.

He also helped found the art journal Dessin: Revue d'Art, d'Éducation et d'Enseignement. As well as his work as a painter, he worked as designer in lace. Later in life Aubert became a supervisor of the decorative painting atelier of the École Nationale Supérieure des Arts Décoratifs.

== Career ==
Aubert exhibited at the Société Nationale des Beaux-Arts in 1895, and in 1896 took part in the first exhibition organised by Les Cinq. Les Cinq took part in the 1897 Société Nationale des Beaux-Arts exhibition, designing the furnishings for a bedroom. Aubert's part in this project was the wall hangings, curtains, chair covers, a silk screen and the carpets.

Some of the few remaining examples of Aubert's lace work can be found displayed at the Musée de la Mode et du Textile in Paris and the Maison des dentelles d'Argentan. His decision to work in lace may have been influenced by the strong tradition of lace-making found in Langrune-Sur-Mer. He frequently collaborated with the lace manufacturer, Robert Frères.

Together with Robert Frères, Aubert developed intricate polychrome lace work that was exhibited at the Galerie des Artistes Modernes in 1898 and 1901. The art critic Julius Meier-Graefe was a particular fan, frequently praising in Aubert in the art journal, Art Décoratif. When Meier-Graefe opened his shop La Maison Moderne in 1899, the entire lace counter was reserved for Aubert's work.

Les Cinq and its successor groups believed in art for all, hence the group's later name. As part of this, members designed works that could be mass-produced and therefore encourage beauty in the houses of all strata of society, not just the rich. This may explain Aubert's collaboration with Robert Frères and other companies such as the Pilon printed velvet company and the Sallandrouze Brothers carpet and tapestry factory.

In 1905 Aubert collaborated with Émile Bliault on a 'Maison Ouvrière' (Working Class House) for the Exposition d'Économie Sociale et d'Hygiène, as part of his ideal of bringing art to everyone.

From 1907 to 1935, Aubert supervised the decorative painting atelier at the École Nationale Supérieure des Arts Décoratifs. One of his developments of the course of the atelier was to include a competitive exam where the students were required to decorate an entire room. This was to teach the students how to develop harmonious designs in a variety of materials including wood, ceramics and metals. He was also part of the Technical and Administrative Council of the Manufacture nationale de Sèvres in the 1920s.

== Notable works ==
An example of Aubert's art, a cotton textile print of water irises, is found in the Metropolitan Museum of Art's collection. The original print was used by the Groupe des Six (the group Les Cinq developed into) to line the walls of their 1898 exhibition at the Galerie des Artistes Modernes. As well as the example found in the Metropolitan Museum's collection, other colourways of the pattern can be found in the Textile Museum in Krefeld and the Landesmuseum in Stuttgart.

More of Aubert's work survives in the Musée de la Houille Blanche, the preserved house of industrialist Aristide Bergès, a rare example of a place where art nouveau decorative art and objects remain in collections and places that they were designed for.
