= The Canal du Loing (painting) =

Painting by Alfred Sisley

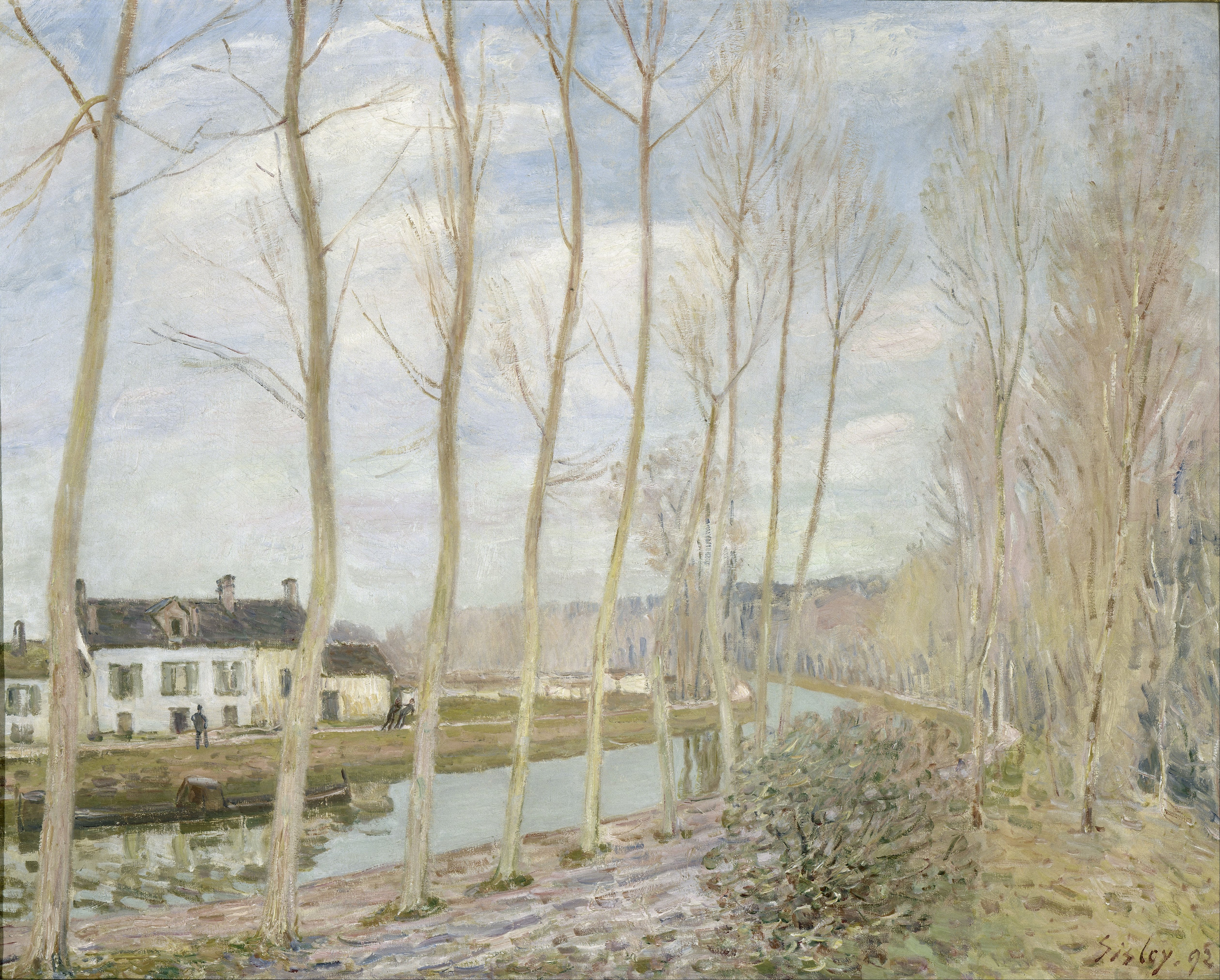
- Artist: Alfred Sisley
- Year: 1892
- Medium: oil on canvas
- Dimensions: 73 cm × 93 cm (29 in × 37 in)
- Location: Musée d'Orsay, Paris

The Canal du Loing or The Canal du Loing at Moret is an 1892 painting by Alfred Sisley, donated to the Musée du Luxembourg after the painter's death in 1899 by a group of the painter's friends headed by Claude Monet. It is now in the Musée d'Orsay (INV 20723). A similar work, painted in winter 1891, is now in the National Museum of Fine Arts of Algiers.

== Production ==
It was produced after Sisley settled in Moret-sur-Loing for good. The town was criss-crossed by several watercourses, notably the picturesque river Loing, the left tributary of the Seine. The Canal du Loing is no longer bordered by trees as shown. Sisley commented to Adolphe Tavernier the same year as painting the work "the sky can never be merely a background [...] I emphasize this part of a landscape because I would like to make you understand the importance I attach to it. [...] I always begin a picture with the sky".

Gustave Geffroy described another painting of the same subject by Sisley: "I paint a winter day, frosty and sunny. The ground, the sky, the canal, the fine skeleton of the trees, all is mauve, phasing towards pink, the air is gilded. Three parallel roads, developed in depth, lead to a distant background lined with poplars. Beside the metallic water meander a dark man and a clear horse, both tiny next to the sparkling hedge, burning with colour. The atmosphere is so pure that if the dark man uttered a cry, the three ways and the canal would carry the echo to the vaults of the world."

== Gallery ==
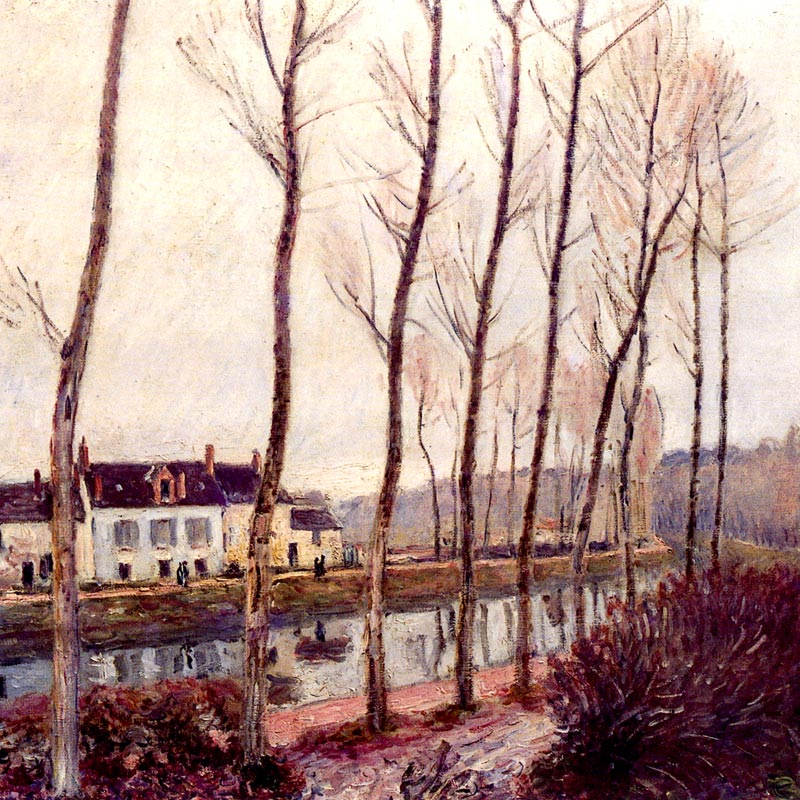
The Canal du Loing in Winter 1891 by Alfred Sisley, National Museum of Fine Arts of Algiers

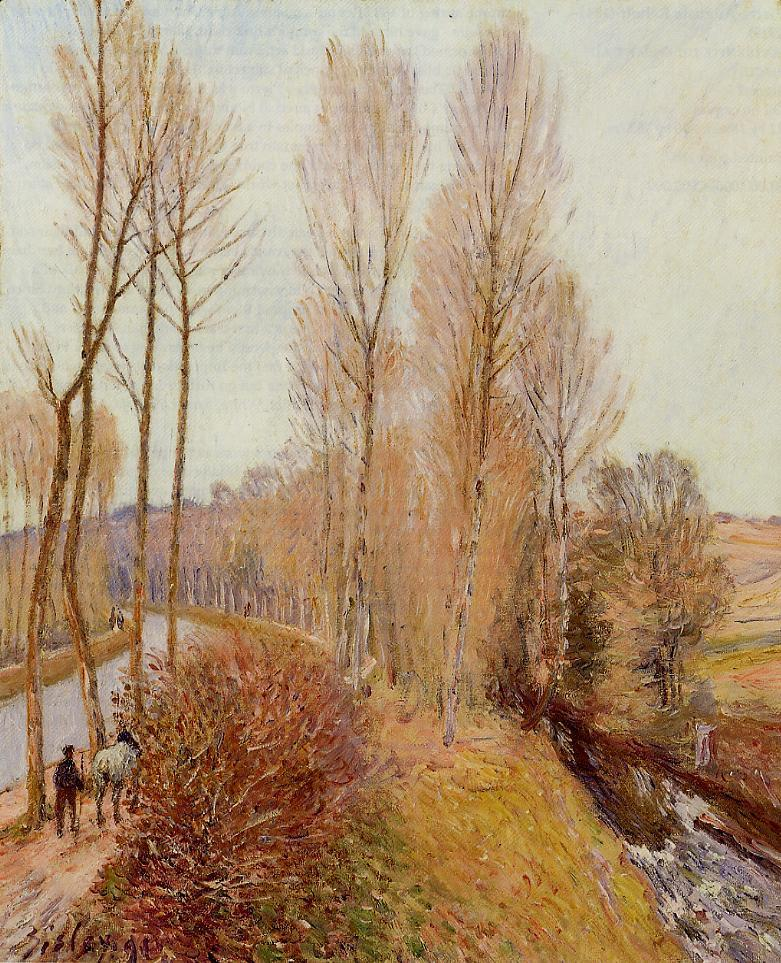
Path beside the canal du Loing 1891 by Alfred Sisley, location unknown

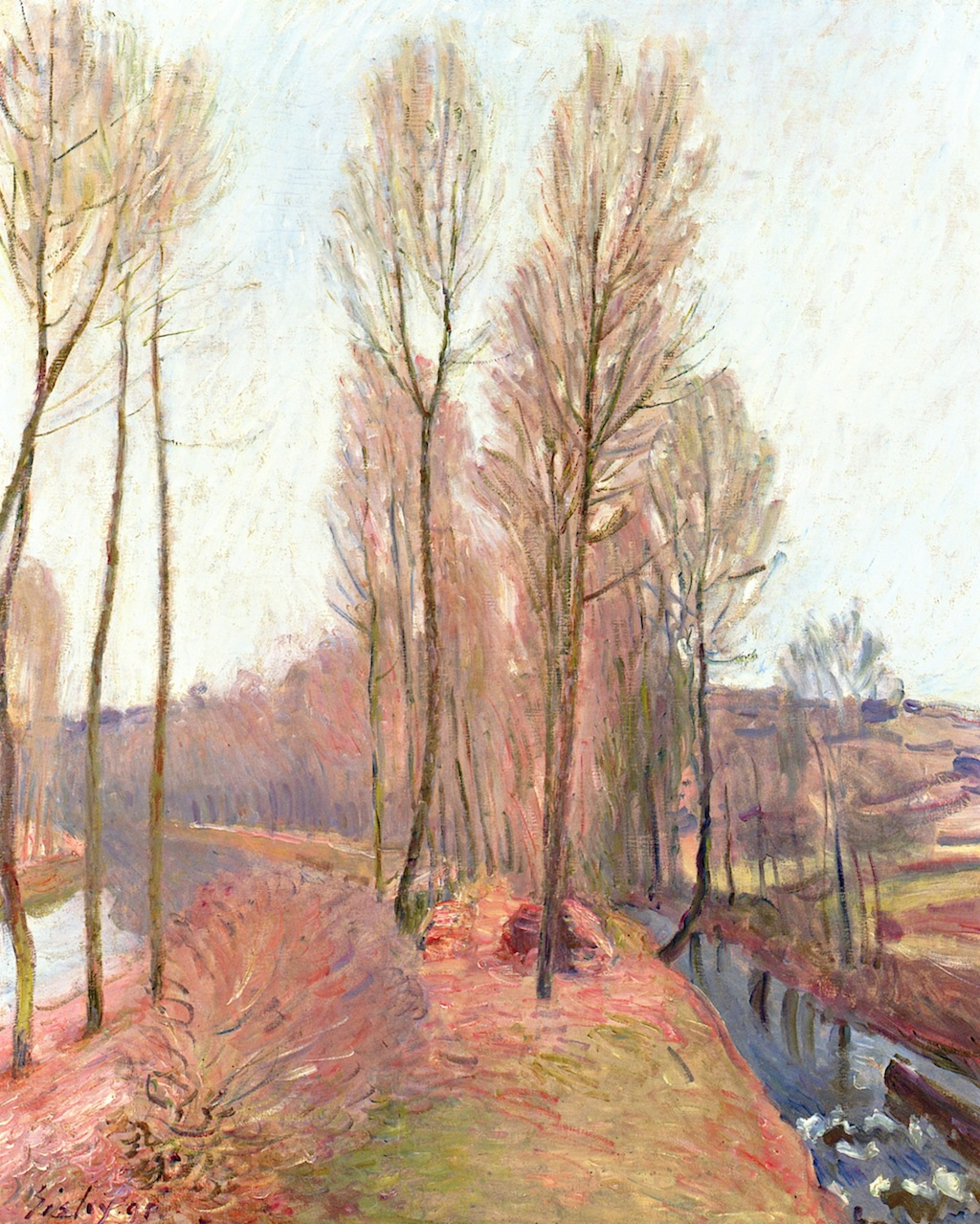
The Orvanne and the canal du Loing in Winter 1891 par Alfred Sisley, private collection

== Reception ==
Hergé's 1958 Coke en stock includes Captain Haddock acquiring the painting reflecting Hergé's interest in painting at this time. It also formed part of the French Post's Year of Impressionism via a stamp with an intaglio reproduction of the painting by Pierre Gandon.

== See also ==
- List of paintings by Alfred Sisley
