= Maurice Dufrêne =

French designer

- Dufrêne by Laure Albin Guillot in 1925
- Born: 1876; Paris, France
- Died: 1955 (aged 78–79); Nogent-sur-Marne, France
- Occupation: Decorative artist
- Known for: Maîtrise workshop

Maurice Dufrêne (1876–1955) was a French decorative artist who headed the Maîtrise workshop of the Galeries Lafayette department store.

== Life ==
Maurice Dufrêne was born in Paris in 1876. His father had a wholesale commodities business. Dufrêne would collect left-over pieces of wood, cardboard and fabric from his father's workplace and turn them into decorative artworks. He studied at the École des Arts Decoratifs. Originally he planned to be a painter.

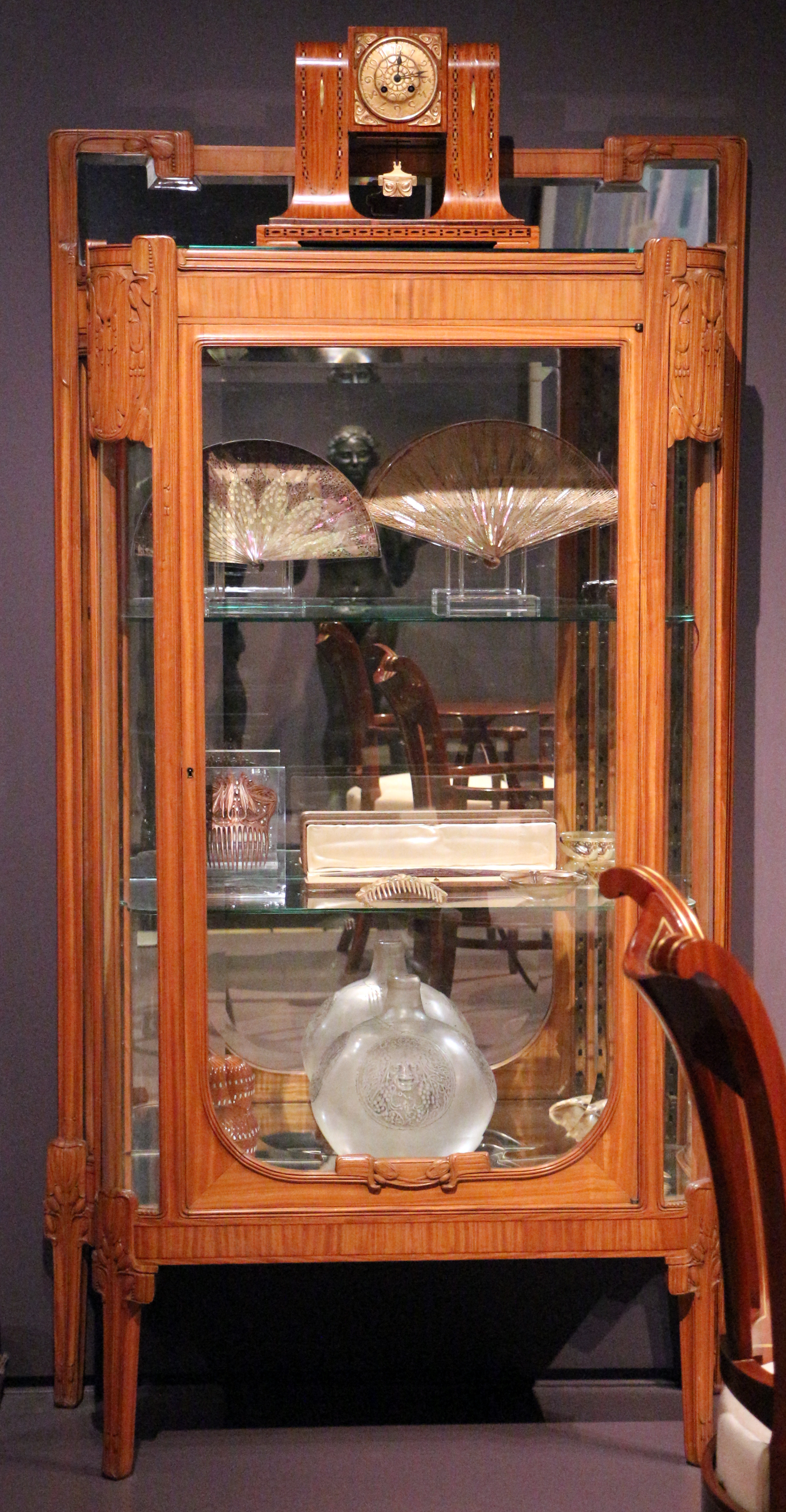
Vitrine, Musée d'Orsay

Dufrêne found a position as a manager and furniture designer at La Maison Moderne of Julius Meier-Grafe, whose showrooms displayed rooms decorated in Art Nouveau style. There he worked with designers such as Henry van de Velde, Victor Horta, Charles Plumet and Anthony Selmersheim. From 1903 Dufrêne exhibited regularly at the Salon d'Automne and the Salons of Société Nationale des Beaux-Arts. In 1904 he was one of the founding members of the Société des artistes décorateurs, and for thirty years he would exhibit at its Salon. He designed many different types of decorative art including metalwork, ceramics, glass and fabric. He also designed complete interiors, but was best known for his furniture.

Dufrêne taught at the École Boulle of Paris from 1912 to 1923. He also taught at the École des Arts Appliqués. He was one of the main designers of the modernistic set for the 1919 film Le Carnaval des vérités. In 1921 the Galeries Lafayette launched the Maîtrise workshop under Dufrêne's direction. This workshop followed the Primavera of the Printemps store founded in 1912 by René Guilleré and also competed with Paul Follot's Pomone of Le Bon Marché, and the Studium of the Grands Magasins du Louvre.

Dufrêne designed the Maîtrise exhibit of the 1925 International Exposition of Modern Industrial and Decorative Arts in Paris. The pavilion itself was designed by the architects J. Henart, G. Tribout and G. Beau. Dufrêne decorated the interior with painting on the walls and ceiling, hanging lights, narrow metal railings and decorative objects. Every element illustrated the Art Deco objective of developing a new style. He produced designs for Christofle, a large firm that manufactured high-quality Art Deco metalwork in the 1920s and 1930s. He remained busy throughout the 1930s.

In 1941, during the Second World War, with Luigi Corbellini, Pierre Gandon, Gérard Cochet, and others Dufrêne was one of the painters and sculptors who received the higher rate of 10,000 Francs from the City of Paris to compensate artists and intellectuals for loss of income.

Dufrêne died in Nogent-sur-Marne in 1955.

== Style ==
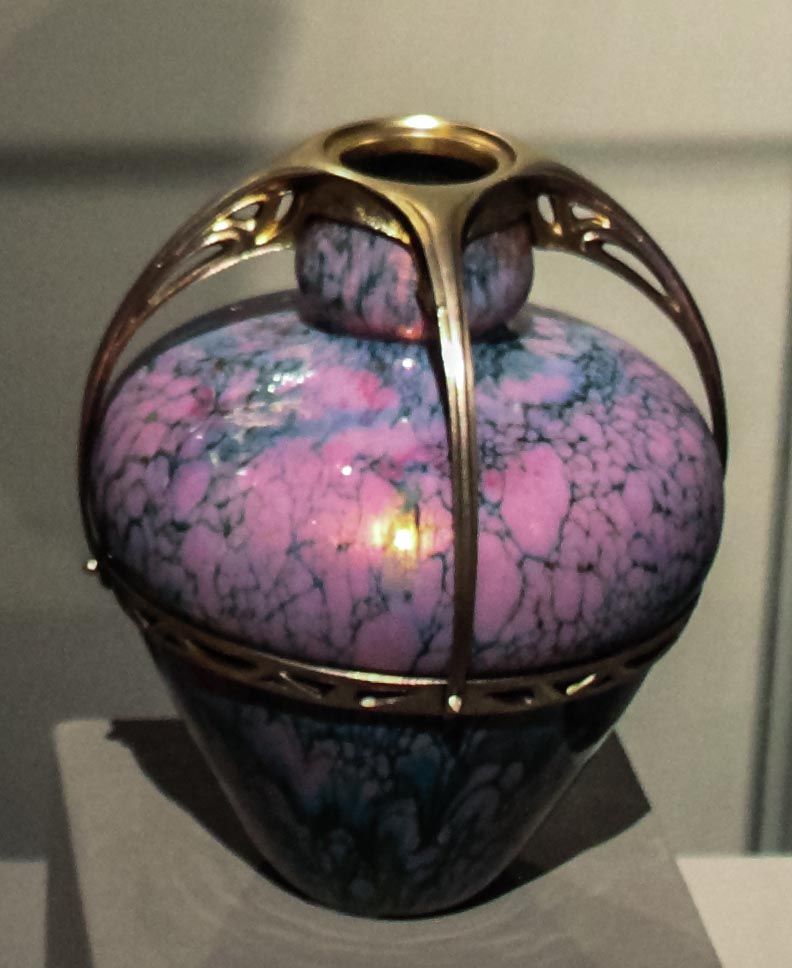
Vase, Budapest Museum of Applied Arts

Dufrêne began work during the height of the Art Nouveau period, but soon turned away from this style. In the 1920s he quickly adapted to the Art Deco movement. He hated the uniform tubular steel chairs that became common in the 1930s, writing, "The same chair, mechanical and tubular that is to be found in almost every country – Austria, America, Germany, Sweden, France etc. It is the anonymous, neutral universal chair...that is the root cause of the great Dullness." By contrast, La Maîtrise emphasized that its furniture was individual, "The works of La Maîtrise are registered; the works of La Maîtrise are signed."

Dufrêne's furniture designs show that he appreciated craftsmanship and workshop production. His designs from 1910 onward combine structure and decoration in a harmonious balance. They are austere and neoclassical, reminiscent of the Louis XVI style. Usually his furniture was made of dark mahogany, in some cases with ebonized decoration, but usually did not have carved ornament. His style became simpler and more angular in the 1930s.

== Publications ==
- Dufrêne, Maurice (1926). Ensembles mobiliers. Mobiliers. Exposition internationale 1925. 1re série. 2e série. Ed. Charles Moreau. p. 332.
- Dufrêne, Maurice (1926). Les Poèmes du silence... Précédés de fragments d'un essai sur la poésie. Mercure de Flandres. OCLC 459356958.
- Dufrêne, Maurice (1929). Eugène Moreau (ed.). Meubles meublants. Paris.
- Dufrêne, Maurice (1937). C. Moreau (ed.). Ensembles mobilier.
- Dufrêne, Maurice (1989). Authentic art deco interiors : from the 1925 Paris exhibition. Introduction by Alastair Duncan. London: Antique Collectors' Club. p. 223.
- Dufrêne, Maurice (2012). 305 Authentic Art Nouveau Jewelry Designs. Dover Jewelry and Metalwork, Courier Corporation. ISBN 978-0486141954.

== Sources ==
- Belleissue Lourie, Ariane de la (2007). Mass-produced Aura: Thonet and the Market for Modern Design, 1930–1953. ISBN 978-0-549-62140-9.
- "Maurice Dufrène (français, 1876 – 1955)". Artnet.
- McHale, Gary (2009-10-09). "Maurice Dufrene". Art Deco Designers.
- Miller, Judith (2005-10-03). Art Deco. DK Publishing. ISBN 978-0-7566-4906-7.
- Pile, John F. (2005). A history of interior design. Laurence King Publishing. ISBN 978-1-85669-418-6.
- Raizman, David (2003). History of Modern Design: Graphics and Products Since the Industrial Revolution. Laurence King Publishing. ISBN 978-1-85669-348-6.
- Samoyault-Verlet, Colombe (2015). "DUFRÊNE MAURICE - (1876-1955)". Encyclopædia Universalis [en ligne] (in French).
