= Castel Sant'Angelo and the Tiber, Rome =

1820s painting by Jean-Baptiste-Camille Corot

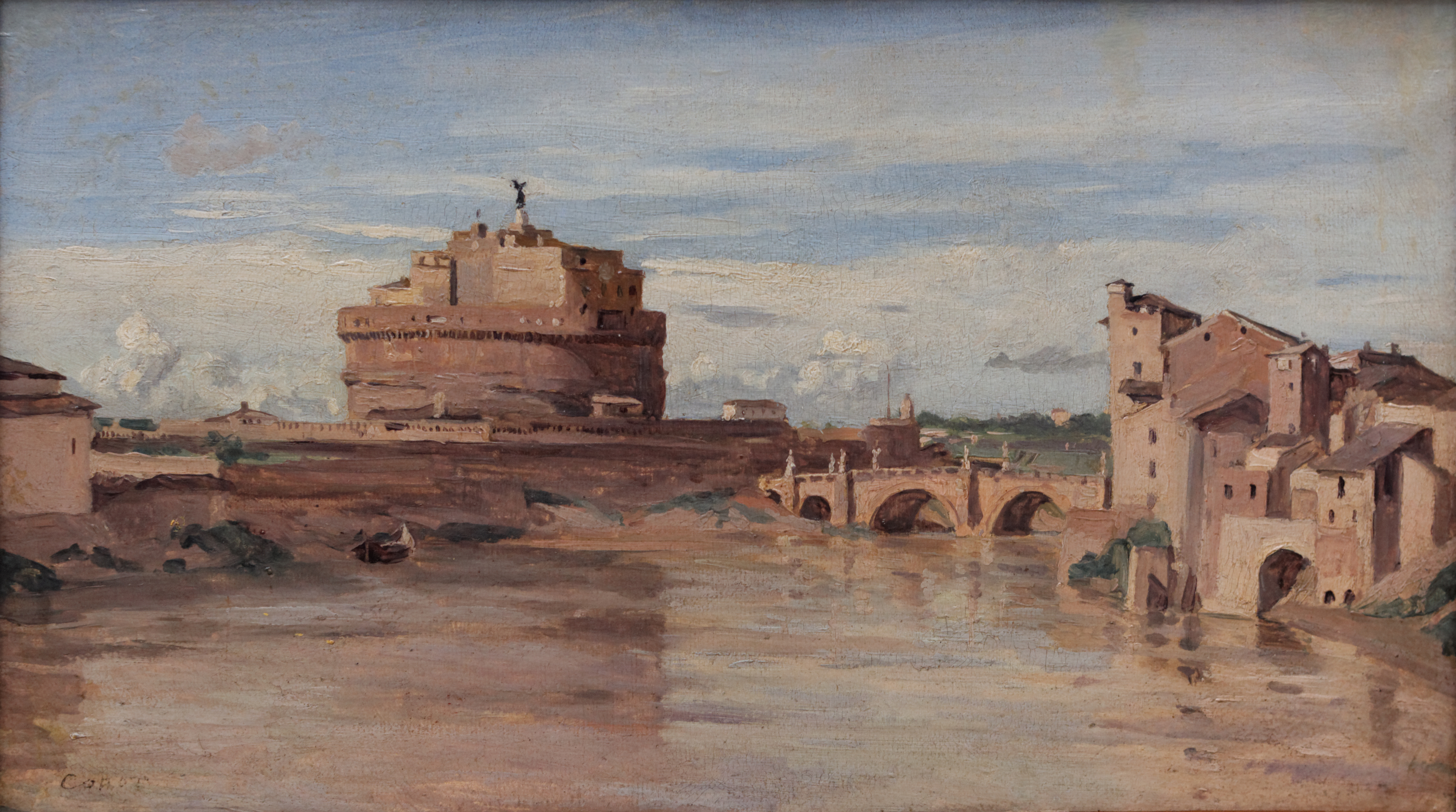
- Artist: Jean-Baptiste-Camille Corot
- Year: 1826–1828
- Medium: Oil on canvas
- Dimensions: 26.5 cm × 46.5 cm (10.4 in × 18.3 in)
- Location: Louvre, Paris

Castel Sant'Angelo and the Tiber, Rome is an oil-on-canvas painting made by French artist Jean-Baptiste-Camille Corot, between 1826 and 1828. Its a veduta which depicts the cityscape formed by the Castel Sant'Angelo and the Tiber River, in Rome, Italy. It is held at the Louvre, in Paris. Corot signed it, at the bottom left.

== Description ==
The painting was one of the several that Corot did of the same subject during a stay in Rome in his youth. It depicts a view of Rome, largely occupied by the Tiber River, in the foreground, while the Castel Sant'Angelo is seen at the center left. It also shows a bridge that crosses the river and several buildings on the right. The painter used loose brushstrokes in the canvas in a technique that seems sketchy or even pre-impressionistic.

== Provenance ==
The painting was offered by the French painter and art collector Étienne Moreau-Nélaton, to the Louvre in 1906.
