= Charles Plumet =

- Charles Plumet in 1925 by Laure Albin Guillot
- Born: 17 May 1861; Cirey-sur-Vezouze, Meurthe-et-Moselle, France
- Died: 15 May 1928 (aged 66); Paris, France
- Occupations: Architect, decorator, ceramist
- Known for: Art Nouveau

Charles Plumet (17 May 1861 – 15 April 1928) was a French architect, decorator and ceramist.

== Life ==
Charles Plumet was born in 1861. He became an architect and designed buildings in medieval and early French Renaissance styles. He collaborated with Tony Selmersheim (1871–1971) on interiors and furniture design in Art Nouveau forms. Charles Plumet became a member of l’Art dans Tout (Art in Everything), an association of architects, painters and sculptors that was actively trying to renew decorative art between 1896 and 1901, following styles from adapted medieval to Art Nouveau. Other members were Tony Selmersheim, Henri Sauvage, Henri Nocq, Alexandre Charpentier, Félix Aubert, Jean Dampt and then Étienne Moreau-Nélaton.

Plumet was committed to functionalism and against the academic approach of the École des Beaux-Arts. In 1902 he expressed the principle that "forms derive from needs". In 1907 he published two articles on regional architecture in L'Art et les artistes in which he said architecture should be united with the landscape. He wrote an article that praised Louis Bonnier (1856-1946), who he thought had carefully adapted forms to contexts and needs, but he rejected architecture that imitated the landscape. He said architecture should "develop in its setting like a flower or plant." However, he gave the functionalist view that designers should add elements such as balconies, terraces, porches or gables "as context suggested" to express "the dweller's needs with regard to the climate, the orientation and the view."

By the start of the 20th century the partnership of Selmersheim and Plumet had become the leading Art Nouveau company in Paris. They tried to combine British and Belgian design innovations with French taste. The results could be graceful. Plumet's façades often included polychrome materials, bay windows and galleries open on one side. However, the buildings were not particularly innovative apart from the addition of curvilinear ornamentation, which was unusual at the time. Gustave Soulier considered Plumet and Selmersheim were truly innovative in their furniture designs, which combined workmanship, elegance and functionality.

In 1908 Frantz Jourdain was president of the Salon d'automne, Plumet was vice-president and Henri Sauvage was sectional president for architecture. These three were visited in turn by Charles-Edouard Jeanneret, later known as Le Corbusier, who was looking for work. None of them could offer anything significant. Plumet was chief architect of the Exposition Internationale des Arts Décoratifs, Paris (1925).

Charles Plumet died in 1928.

== Sample buildings ==
Plumet was the architect of many apartment blocks and hôtels particuliers in the 16th arrondissement of Paris. Examples of his expensive residential buildings in Paris are 67 Avenue de Raymond-Poincaré (1895), 50 Avenue Victor Hugo (1900–1), and 15 and 21 Boulevard Lannes (1906). The house on Avenue de Raymond-Poincaré, completed in 1898, was the first major work by Plumet and Selmersheim. It had a simple rectilinear form with very restrained use of Belgian-style decoration, and seems to be derived from Renaissance revival. A contemporary praised the building on Boulevard Lannes for "the play of solids and voids, the undulations of the facades in agreement with the layout of the apartments. Other buildings include the Château de Chênemoireau, Loire-et-Cher (1901), and an office block at 33 Rue du Louvre, Paris (1913–14).

Plumet was charged with designing the outside entrances to the Pelleport, Saint-Fargeau, and Porte des Lilas stations on the Paris Metro Line 3bis, which was finally completed in December 1920. Plumet designed the stations so the elevators are accessible directly from the surface. The three stations are made of reinforced concrete and ciment de Grenoble; they are decorated with ceramics made by Gentil & Bourdet. The stations are accessible only by the elevators. Plumet designed four towers for the 1925 exhibition, each with a regional restaurant from which the diners could look out over the city. He also designed the crafts palace.

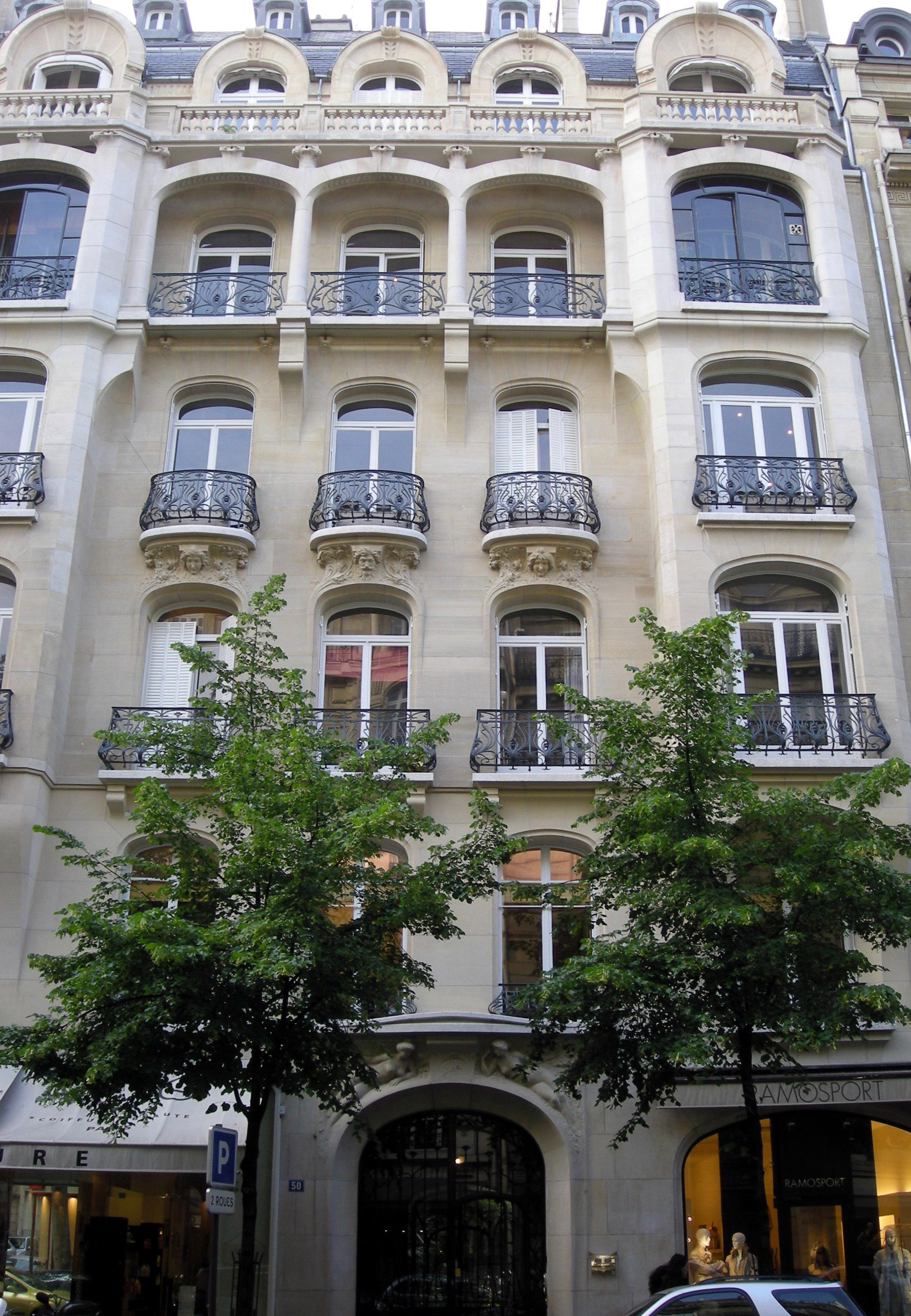
50, avenue Victor Hugo, Paris 16th arrondissement

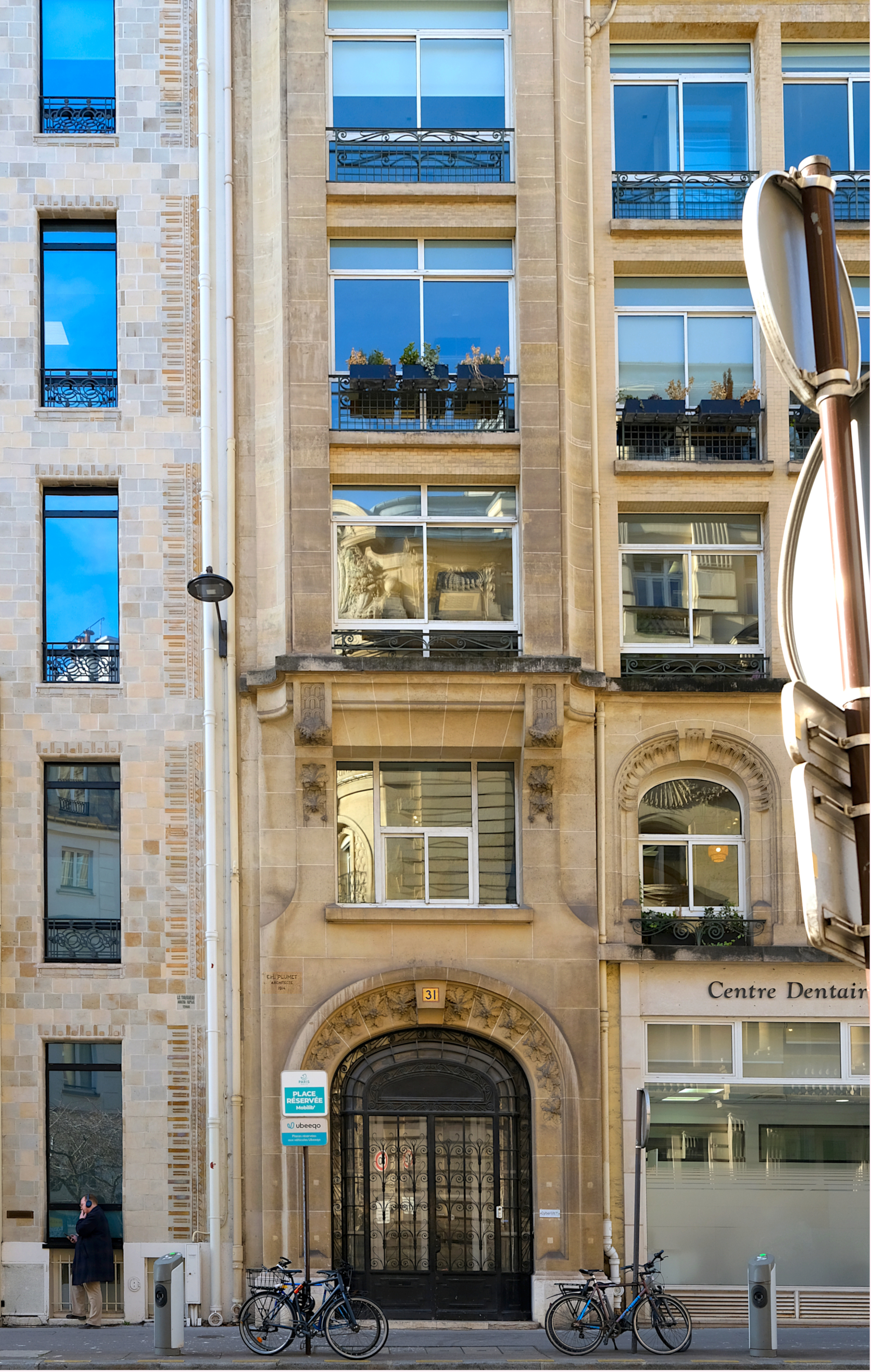
31, rue du Louvre, Paris 2nd arrondissement

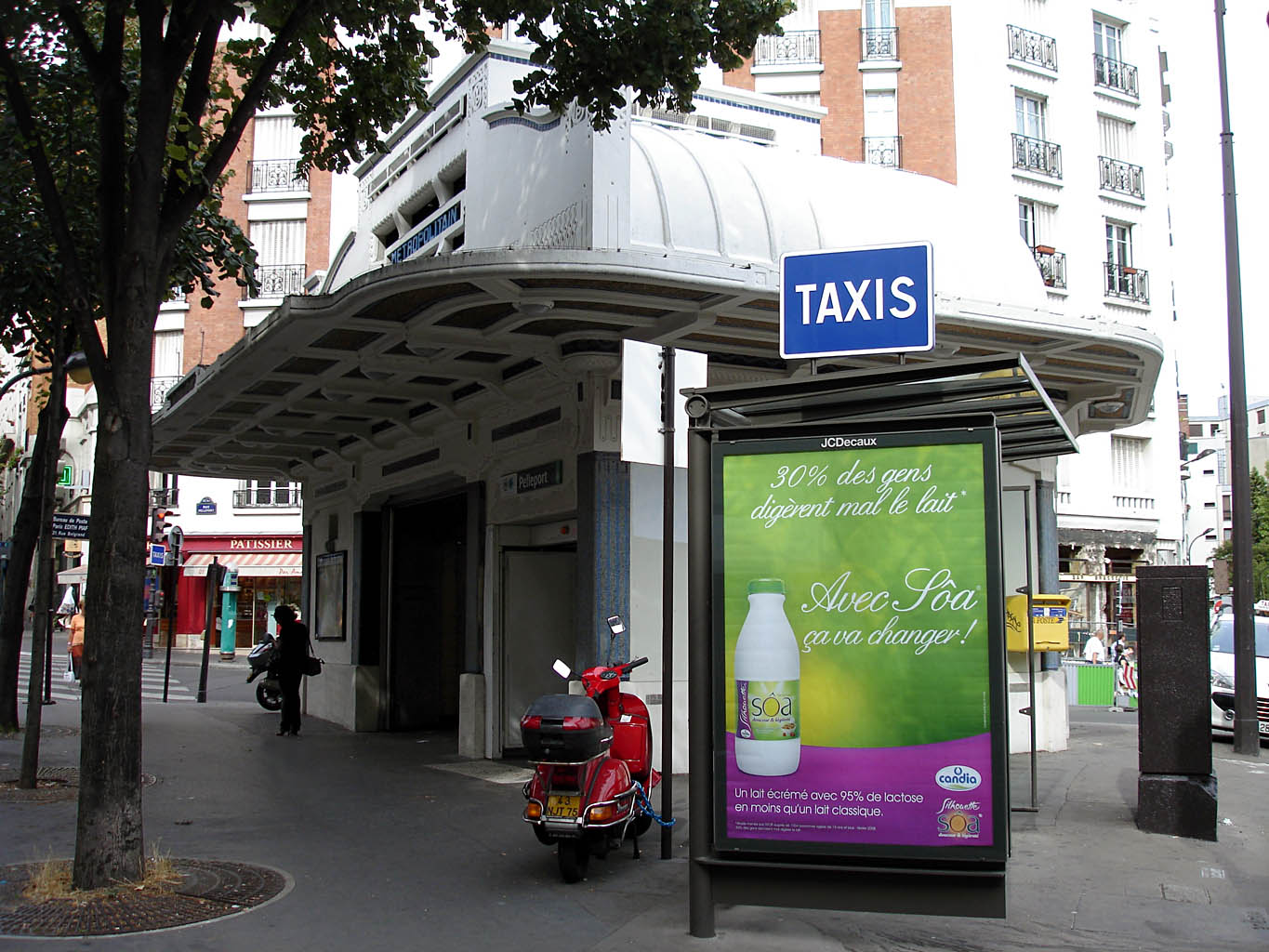
Entrance to the Pelleport station

== Sources ==
- Brooks, H. Allen (1999-05-01). Le Corbusier's Formative Years: Charles-Edouard Jeanneret at La Chaux-de-Fonds. University of Chicago Press. p. 158. ISBN 978-0-226-07582-2.
- Curl, James Stevens (2006). "Charles Plumet". A Dictionary of Architecture and Landscape Architecture. Oxford University Press. ISBN 9780198606789. Archived from the original on 2015-07-09.
- Froissart-Pezone, Rossella; Bouillon, Jean-Paul (2015). "L'Art dans Tout". Archived from the original on 2015-07-09.
- Garric, Jean-Philippe; Orgeix, Emilie d'; Thibault, Estelle (2011). Le livre et l'architecte: actes du colloque organisé par l'Institut national d'histoire de l'art et l'École nationale supérieure d'architecture de Paris-Belleville, Paris, 31 janvier-2 février 2008. Editions Mardaga. ISBN 978-2-8047-0047-8.
- Gronberg, Tag (2003). Designs on Modernity: Exhibiting the City in 1920s Paris. Manchester University Press. ISBN 978-0-7190-6674-0.
- Lenning, Henry F. (2013-11-11). The art nouveau. Springer. ISBN 978-94-017-5970-0.
- Magne, H.-M. (1922). "Les nouvelles gares du métropolitain". Art et Décoration.
- Meganck, Leen; Santvoort, Linda Van; Meyer, Jan de (2013). Regionalism and Modernity: Architecture in Western Europe, 1914-1940. Universitaire Pers Leuven. ISBN 978-90-5867-918-5.
- Roux-Spitz, Michel; Raynaud, Michel; Laroque, Didier; Rémy, Sylvie (1983). Michel Roux-Spitz. Editions Mardaga. ISBN 978-2-87009-194-4.
- Tricoire, Jean (1999). Un siècle de métro en 14 lignes. De Bienvenüe à Météor. ISBN 2902808879.
- Watkin, David (2005). A History of Western Architecture. Laurence King Publishing. ISBN 978-1-85669-459-9.
- Weisberg, Gabriel P.; Menon, Elizabeth K. (2013-09-05). Art Nouveau: A Research Guide for Design Reform in France, Belgium, England, and the United States. Routledge. ISBN 978-1-135-02314-0.
- Dagmar Frings / Jörg Kuhn: Die Borchardts. Auf den Spuren einer Berliner Familie, Berlin 2011 (Verlag Hentrich & Hentrich) ISBN 978-3-942271-17-2 (Hôtel du peintre Félix Borchardt, 21, Rue Octave Feuillet, 16° Ar. Paris (1907/1909)
