= Élisa Beetz-Charpentier =

French sculptor, medallist and painter

Élisa Beetz-Charpentie
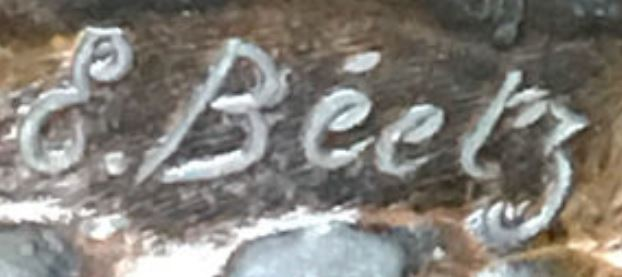
- Elisa Beetz's signature
- Born: 1859; Schaerbeek, Belgium
- Died: 1949 (aged 89–90); Neuilly-sur-Seine, France
- Known for: Sculpture

Élisa Beetz-Charpentier (1859 – 1949) was a French sculptor, medallist and painter. She studied sculpture at the Brussels Academy.

== Work ==
Beetz-Charpentier was principally active as an artist from 1905 to 1924. Between 1910 et 1924, she showed at the Paris Salon as a member of the Société nationale des beaux-arts, which she joined in 1905.

In 1909 she won a First Prize for "a Plaquette commemorating the Centenary of the Paris Firm of Pleyel, in competition with several other medallists."

In 1918, she created Claude Debussy's funeral mask, which is now held in the Cité de la Musique, Paris. Seven of her medallion works are held in the Museé d'Orsay, Paris.

According to the research of Polish heraldist Jerzy Michta published in 2017, the version of the coat of arms of Poland used since 1927, designed by artist Zygmunt Kamiński, was actually copied from a 1924 plaque by Elisa Beetz-Charpentier made in honor of Ignacy Paderewski.

== Personal life ==
Her second husband was Alexandre Charpentier and the witnesses at their wedding in 1908 were Claude Debussy and Auguste Rodin. Charpentier died a year later, on 4 March 1909.

== Sources ==
- (in German) Elisa Beetz-Charpentier. In: Allgemeines Künstlerlexikon. Die Bildenden Künstler aller Zeiten und Völker (AKL). Band 8, Saur, München u. a. 1993, ISBN 3-598-22748-5, S. 261
