= Alexandre Charpentier =

French sculptor

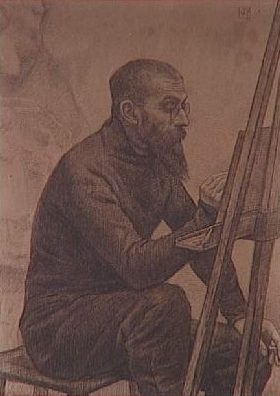
Charpentier, by Théo van Rysselberghe

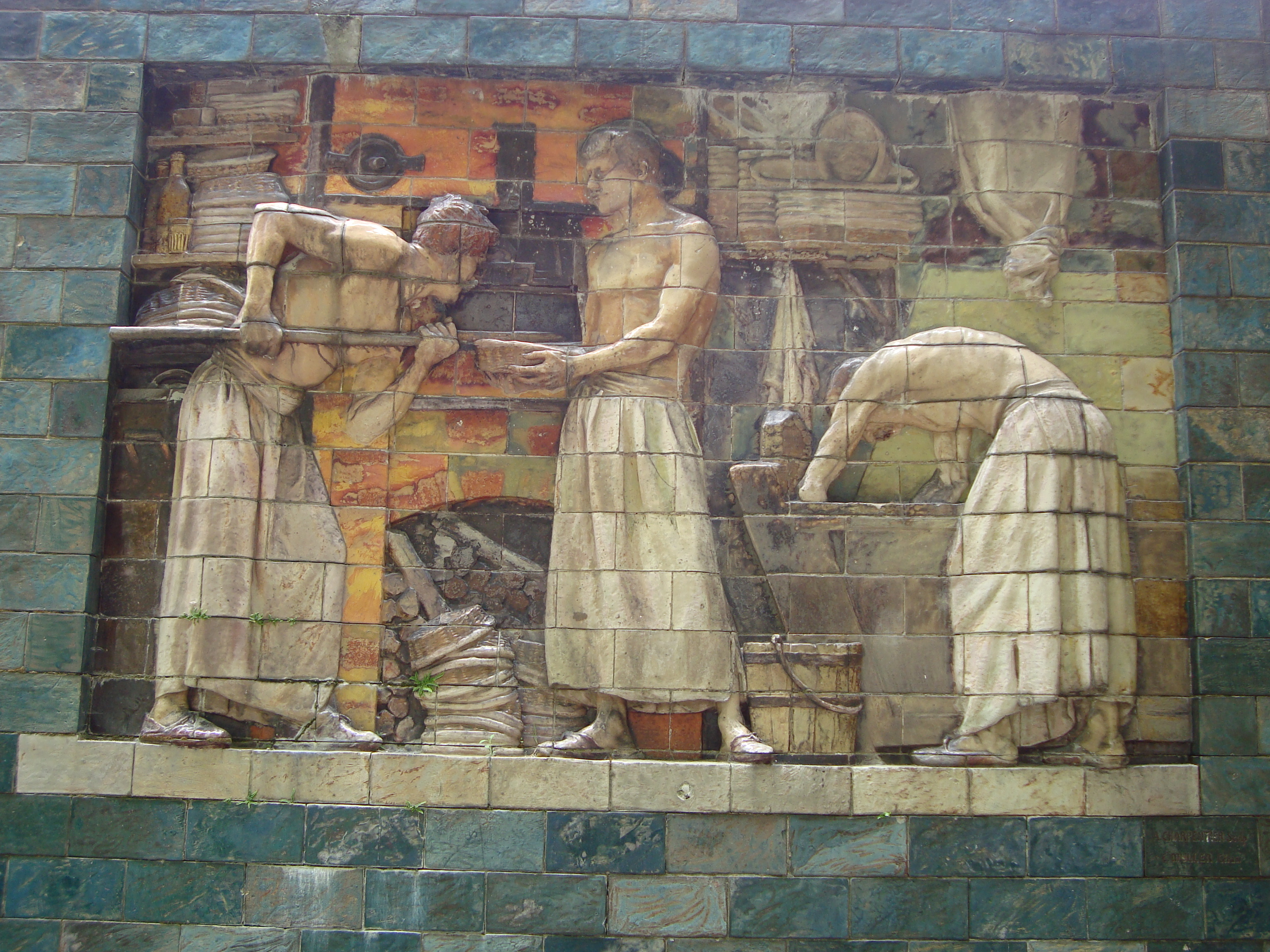
bas-relief, Scipio Square, Paris

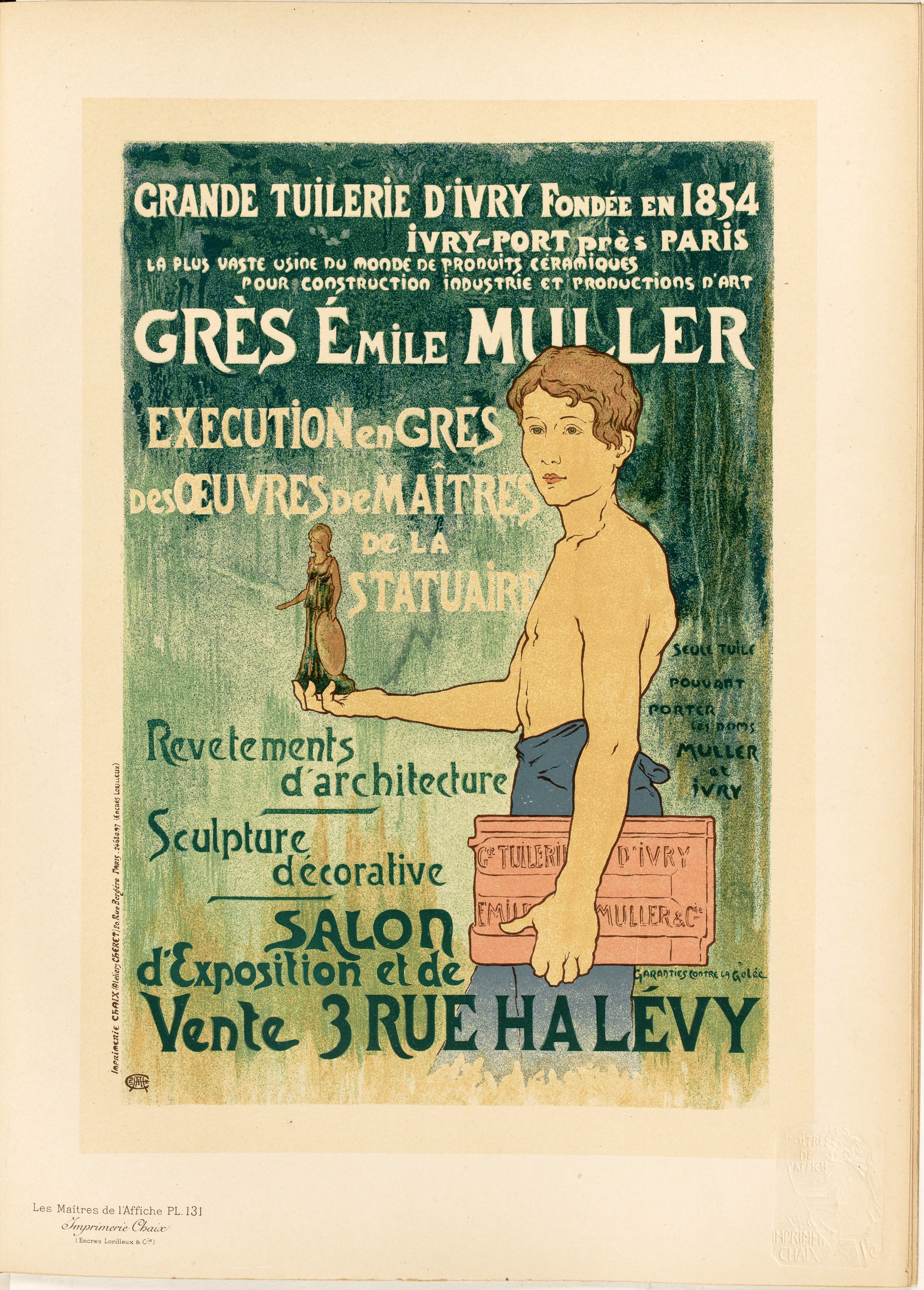
Poster published in Les Maîtres de l'Affiche

Alexandre-Louis-Marie Charpentier (1856–1909) was a French sculptor, medalist, craftsman, and cabinet-maker.

== Life and work ==
From working-class origins and apprenticed to an engraver as a young man, he became a studio assistant to the innovative medallist Hubert Ponscarme. Along with Ponscarme, Louis-Oscar Roty, and other artists, Charpentier advanced a resurgence of art in French medal design. Charpentier's patrons included André Antoine, for whom he designed theatre programmes.

Charpentier experimented with a wide variety of formats and materials—tin, marble, wood, leather, and terra cotta work, the latter executed by ceramic artisan Emile Müller. He opened several cabinet shops and designed many sets of furniture. Many of his custom designs for fixtures (doorknobs, door plates, window handles and the like) were subsequently mass-produced and commercially sold.

Several of Charpentier's works are part of the Musée d'Orsay collection.

=== Social circle ===
Carpentier's artistic and literary social circle was perhaps as significant as his output. Among his friends was Constantin Meunier, with whom he collaborated on a monument of Émile Zola, and he had a hand in the sculptural interiors at Le Chat Noir cabaret. His work was also shown at the Les XX exhibition in Brussels in 1893.

In 1895, he was a founding member of the arts group Les Cinq, which sought to apply new mechanical methods to furniture design. (The other founding members were architect Tony Selmersheim, designer Felix Aubert, sculptor Jean Dampt and painter Étienne Moreau-Nélaton.) Architect Charles Plumet would join in 1896, changing the group's name first to Les Six and then to Art dans Tout with the later association of Henri Sauvage and others.

His second wife was his student, Élisa Beetz-Charpentier, also a medalist and sculptor.

== Sources ==
- National Gallery of Art online biography (pdf format)
- online biography
