= Jean Dampt =

French sculptor

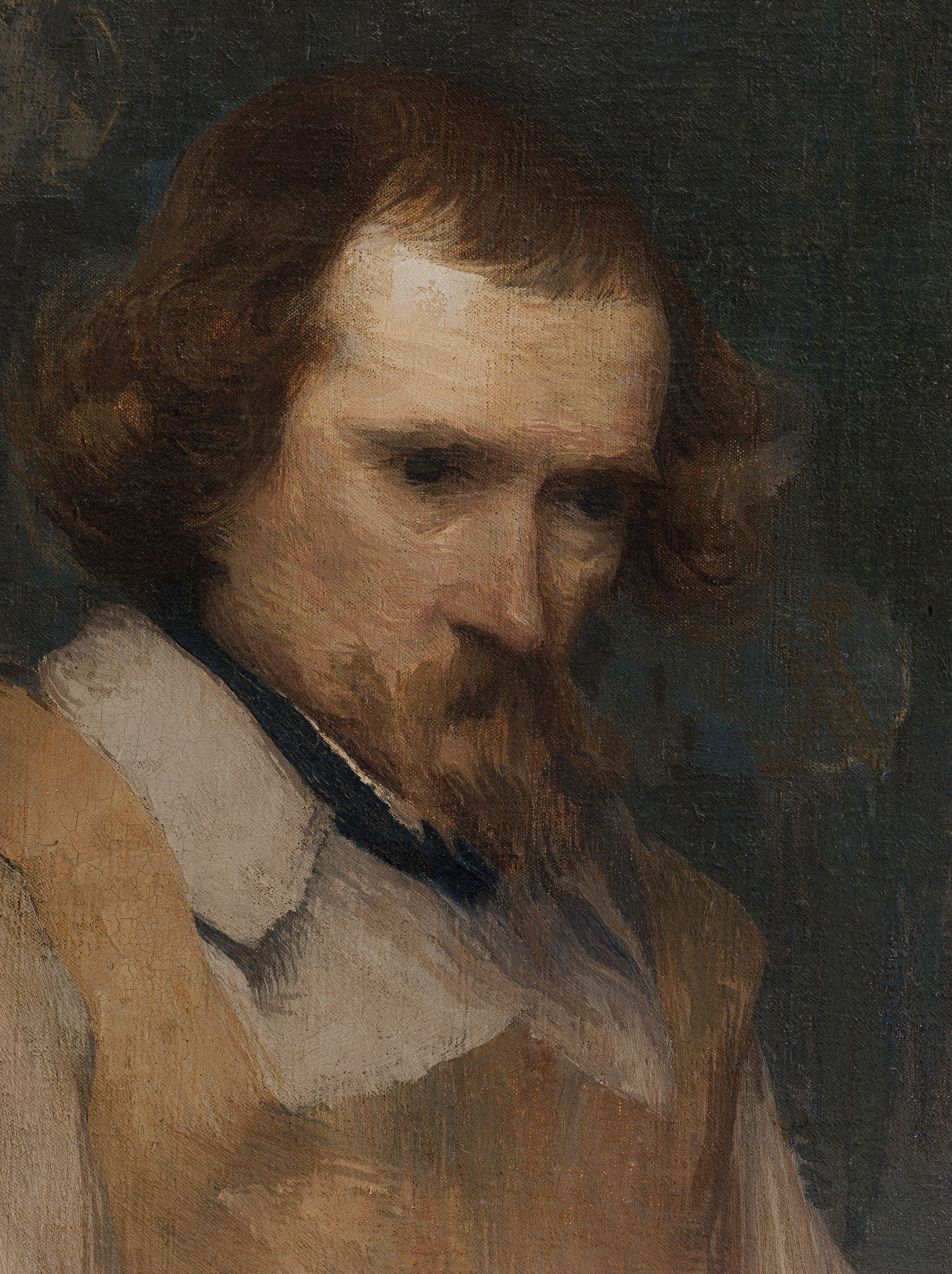
- Born: 2 January 1854
- Died: 26 September 1945 (aged 91)
- Occupation: Sculptor, jeweler, handicrafter
- Awards: Commander of the Legion of Honour

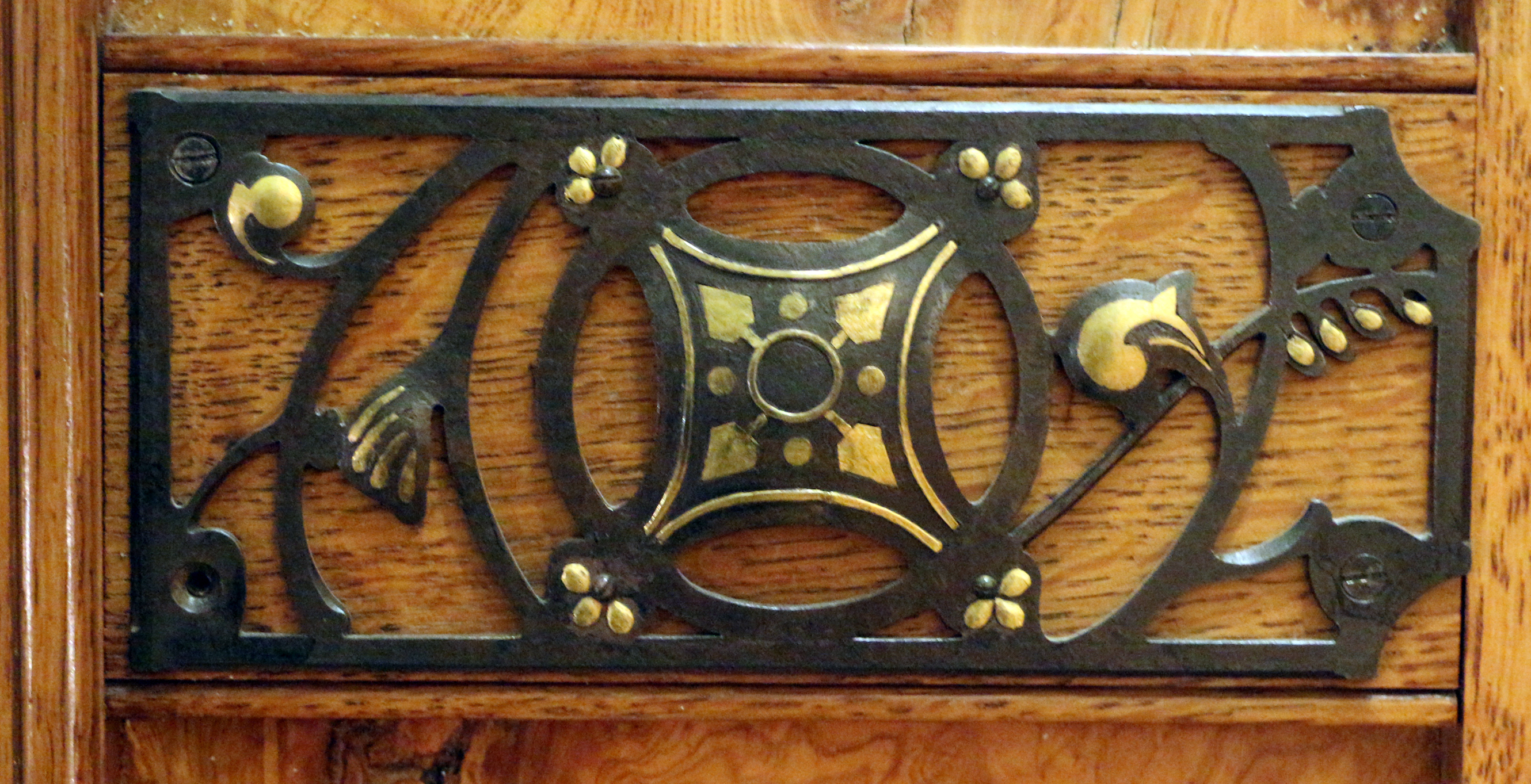
Boiserie for the Salle du Chevalier in the Hôtel de Bearn in Paris, 1900-06, Musée d'Orsay

Jean Baptiste Auguste Dampt (1854–1945) was a French sculptor, medalist, and jeweler, known for his contributions to Art Nouveau and Symbolist art. His work ranged from sculptural pieces to finely crafted medals and jewelry, reflecting his mastery of form and intricate detailing. Dampt's artistic style often incorporated mythological and allegorical themes, and he played a significant role in the late 19th and early 20th-century French decorative arts movement.

== Biography ==
Born in Venarey-les-Laumes as the son of a cabinetmaker, Dampt studied at the École des Beaux-Arts in Dijon, then in 1874 under the leadership of François Jouffroy and Paul Dubois at the École nationale supérieure des Beaux-Arts in Paris . He exhibited for the first time at the Salon of the Société des Artistes Français in 1876. In 1877 he took the deuxième Prix de Rome for sculpture at the Ecole. He completed his military service, then organized an Exhibition of the Society of Friends of the Gold Coast to promote art in its region.

Dampt's work can be described as Symbolist; at the Musée d'Orsay he is classified as Art Nouveau. Some of Dampt's sculptures are exhibited at the Museum of Fine Arts in Dijon.

In 1919 Dampt was appointed to chair #7 of the Académie des Beaux-Arts. Dampt's students include the Americans Frederick Ruckstull, Charles Grafly, and Cyrus Edwin Dallin, and the Swiss Jean Dunand. The animalier François Pompon was an assistant.

== Les Cinq ==
In 1895, Dampt was a founding member of the arts group Les Cinq, which sought to apply new mechanical methods to furniture design. The four other founding members were architect Tony Selmersheim, designer Felix Aubert, sculptor and craftsman Alexandre Charpentier, and the painter Étienne Moreau-Nélaton. Architect Charles Plumet would join in 1896, changing the group's name first to Les Six and then to L'Art pour tous with the later association of Henri Sauvage and others.
