= Luigi Corbellini =

Italian artist (1901–1968)

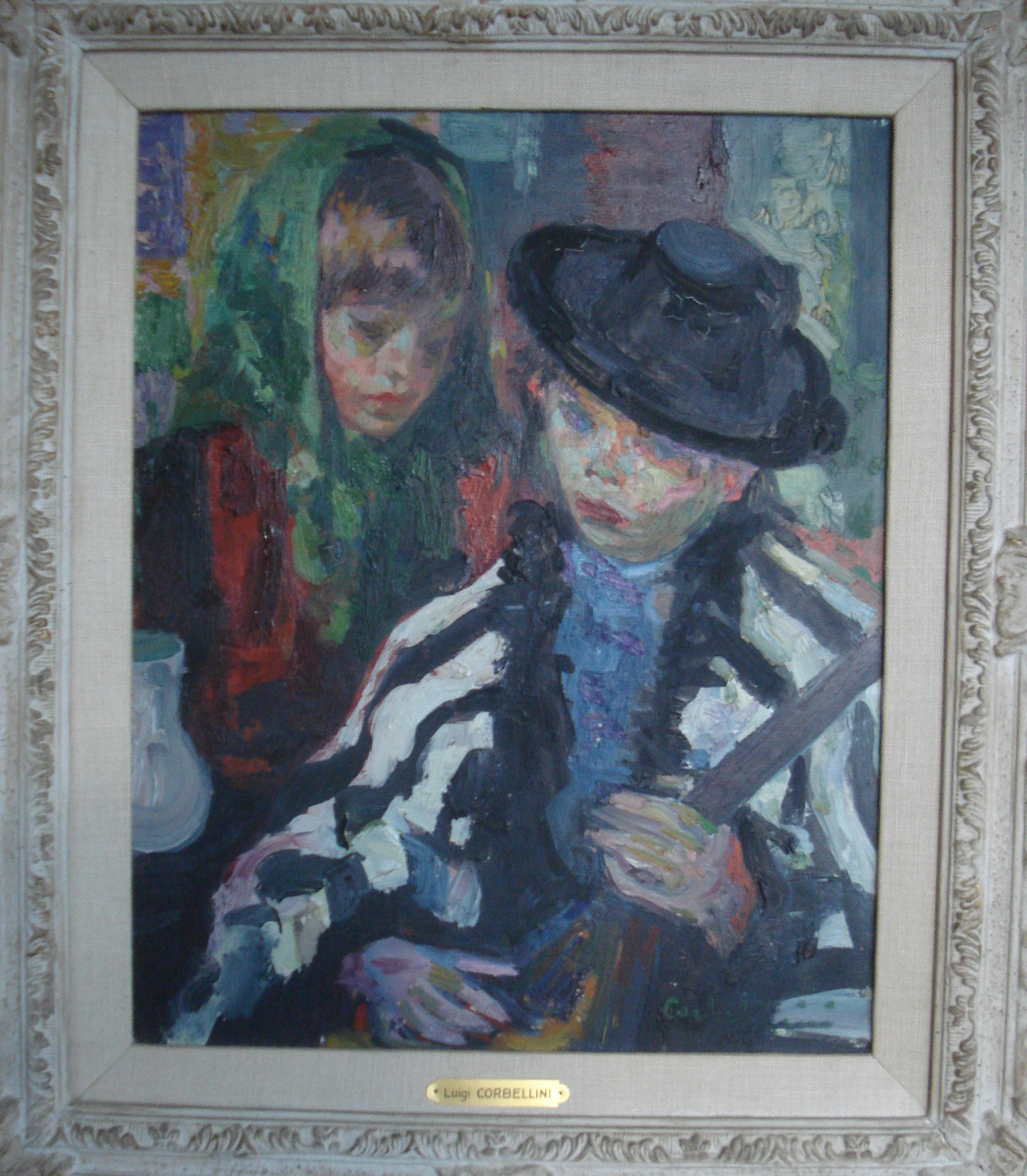
"Les petits gitans", by Corbellini

Luigi Corbellini (11 August 1901 – 9 May 1968) was an Italian post-impressionist painter and sculptor.

== Early life ==
Corbellini was born in 1901 in Piacenza, Italy, the fourth of twelve children of Celeste Corbellini and his wife Giuseppina Gazzola. He began art lessons there at a young age. At thirteen, he joined the Brera Academy in Milan, and after that the Albertina in Turin.

In 1920, when Corbellini was nineteen, the Desclée de Brouwer publishing firm of Bruges announced an international painting competition which he won with a portrait of the Madonna. He was then taken on in the firm's lithographic studio. He arrived in Bruges speaking no French, which he had to learn. He also studied painting with Flori van Acker. He worked for Desclée de Brouwer until 1923 and later noted that this was the only job he had ever had.

In 1923, Corbellini moved to Paris and took a room in a boarding house in Montmartre, waiting for a place at the Bateau-Lavoir. A year later, he was able to take a studio which had once been occupied by Pablo Picasso.

== Career ==
In the summer of 1924, Corbellini was painting scenes in Deauville, where one day his work was admired by Robert de Rothschild, who invited him to paint the portrait of his daughter. This led on to other work. Boni de Castellane commissioned him to paint all of his horses, and Corbellini was able to move from Montmartre to Montparnasse.

By 1928, Corbellini was exhibiting work at the salon of the Société des Artistes Indépendants, later at the Salon des Tuileries, Salon d'Automne, and others. His paintings continued to be exhibited in Parisian galleries until the 1960s.

He became a painter of portraits, landscapes, cityscapes and genre scenes. He was also a sculptor.

In 1941, during the Second World War, with Maurice Dufrêne, Pierre Gandon, Gérard Cochet, and others Corbellini was one of the few painters and sculptors who received the higher rate of 10,000 Francs from the City of Paris to compensate artists and intellectuals for loss of income.

In 1947 Corbellini moved to New York City. He spent the last years of his life travelling the world. He had exhibitions in New York, Los Angeles, Pasadena, Palm Beach, Caracas, Tahiti, Hong Kong, and Japan.

He died in New York on 9 May 1968.

== Exhibitions ==
=== France ===
- Galerie Carmine, Paris: 1927, 1928, 1930, 1931
- Galerie Armand Drouant, Paris: 1931, 1933
- Galerie Barreiro, Paris: 1932, 1934, 1936
- Galerie Borghèse, Paris: 1935
- Galerie Charpentier, Paris: 1937
- Galerie Dalpayrat, Limoges: 1937
- Galerie Grand, Lausanne: 1937
- Galerie Aktuaryus, Strasbourg: 1938
- Galerie Chardin, Paris: 1944, 1945
- Galerie Jouffroy, Paris: 1944
- Galerie d'Orsel, Paris: 1945
- Galerie Mignon-Massard, Nantes: 1945
- Galerie Drouant-David, Paris: 1948
- Galerie Bonval, Paris: 1949
- Galerie J. Hamon, Le Havre: 1950
- Galerie Malaval, Lyon: 1956
- Galerie Durand-Ruel, Paris : 1956, 1958, 1960, 1962

=== United States ===
- University of Colombia, New York: 1948
- Hugo gallery, New York: 1949
- Cowie galleries, Los Angeles: 1950, 1953, 1956
- Hammer galleries, New York: 1952, 1954, 1956, 1959, 1961, 1964, 19663
- Findlay galleries, Chicago: 1959, 1961, 1962
- Findlay Palm Beach, Florida: 1961, 1962
- Manhattan galleries, Pasadena, California: 1961, 1963, 1966
- Juarez gallery, Los Angeles: 1962, 1970

=== Venezuela ===
- Acquavella, Caracas: 1964

== Gallery ==
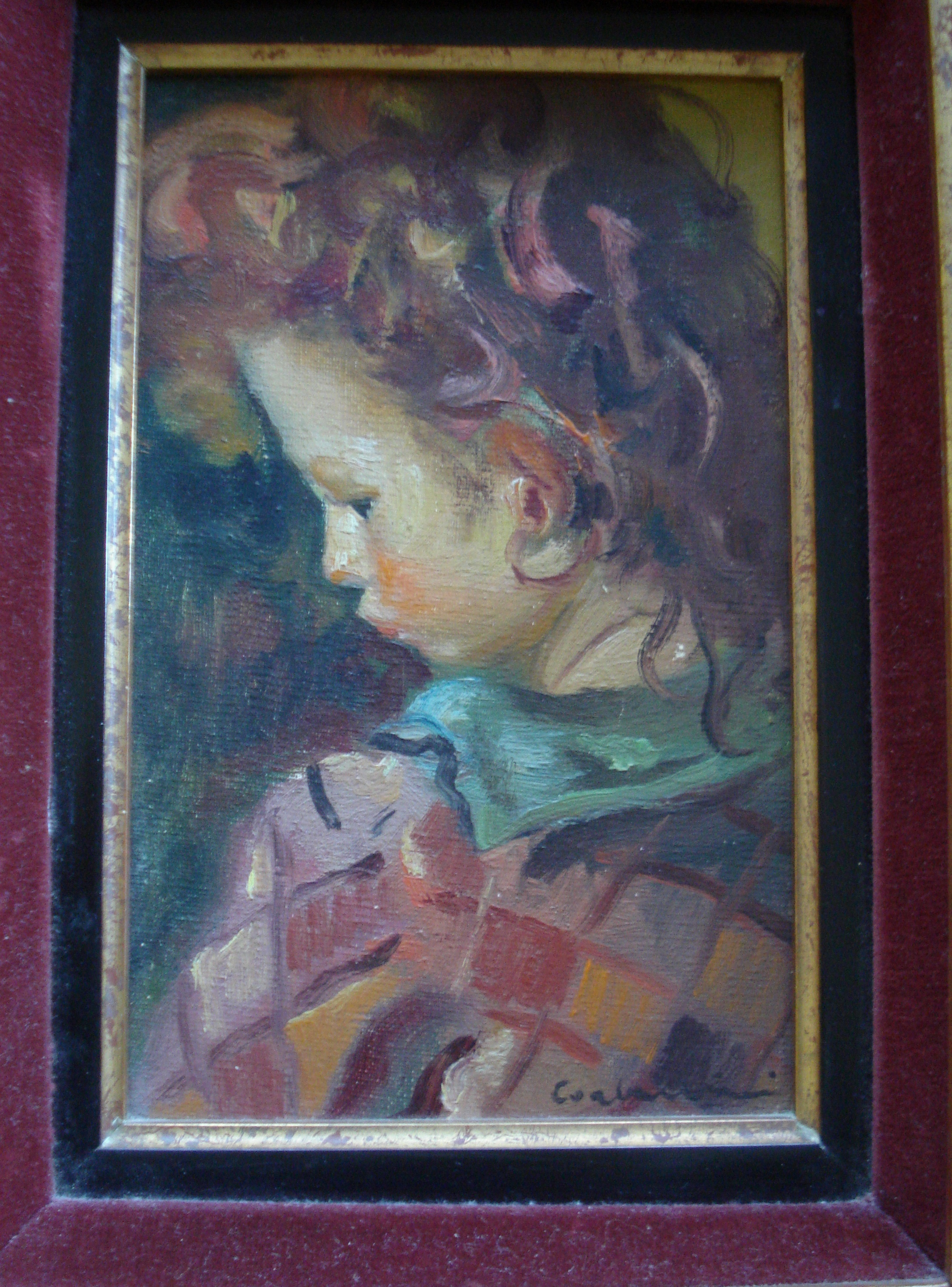
"La petite Arlequine"
