= Gérard Cochet =

French artist (1888–1969)

Gérard Cochet (13 October 1888, in Avranches – 8 January 1969, in Paris) was a French illustrator.

Born in Avranches, France, he attended the Académie Julian in 1909.

After the First World War he exhibited at the Salon des Indépendants and the Salon d'Automne and was awarded the Prix Blumenthal for engraving in 1924. He was chief of studio at the Academie Ranson from 1932 to 1935 and vice-president of the Jeune Gravure Contemporaine.

He painted murals for the Palais de la Decouverte and designed scenery and costumes for the theatre. He also illustrated several books, including the Fables de La Fontaine, Voltaire's Candide, and Jules Laforgue's Les Moralites Legendaires. His works are on show at the Musée d'Art Moderne de la Ville de Paris as well as other French and foreign museums.

In 1941, during the Second World War, with Maurice Dufrêne, Pierre Gandon, Luigi Corbellini, and others Cochet was one of the few painters and sculptors who received the higher rate of 10,000 Francs from the City of Paris to compensate artists and intellectuals for loss of income.

He died in his Paris home in 1969.
