= The Canal du Loing in Winter =

Painting by Alfred Sisley

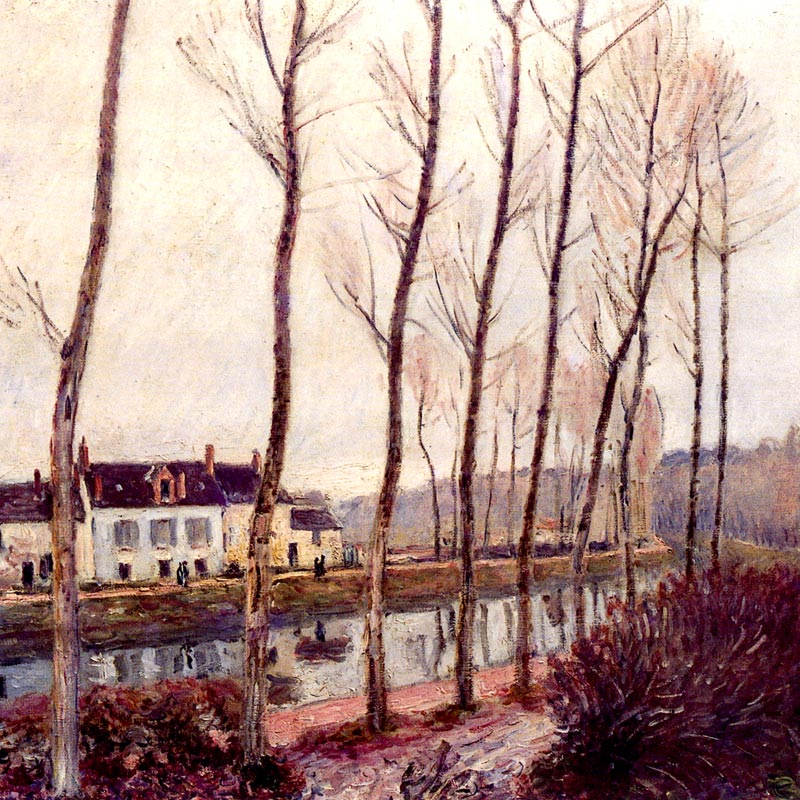
- Artist: Alfred Sisley
- Year: 1891
- Medium: oil on panel
- Dimensions: 73 cm × 60 cm (29 in × 24 in)
- Location: National Museum of Fine Arts of Algiers, Algiers

The Canal du Loing in Winter is a painting of the Canal du Loing, produced by Alfred Sisley in winter 1891. It is now in the National Museum of Fine Arts of Algiers.

== See also ==
- List of paintings by Alfred Sisley
