= Pierre Gandon =

French illustrator (1899–1990)

Pierre Gandon was a French illustrator and engraver of postage stamps. He was born on 20 January 1899 in L'Haÿ-les-Roses (Val-de-Marne) and died on 23 July 1990.

== Youth ==
His father Gaston Gandon was also an engraver at the Institut de gravure of Paris and designed stamps for some countries and two for France (Le Burelé 50 Francs in 1936 and the cathedral of Strasbourg in 1939).

Pierre Gandon studied in Paris at the École Estienne, then at the École des Beaux-Arts. He won his first of many prizes in 1921: the Prix de Rome.

== Stamp designer ==
Gandon answered an advertisement in a paper and finally obtained the right to design "Femme indigène", his first postage stamp series issued 1941 in the French colony of Dahomey.

The same year was issued his first stamp for France : the coat of arms of Reims.

In 1941, during the Second World War, with Luigi Corbellini, Gérard Cochet, and others Gandon was one of the painters and sculptors who received the higher rate of 10,000 Francs from the City of Paris to compensate artists and intellectuals for loss of income.

Four times he received the Grand Prix de l'Art philatélique during his career that including:

- « Haute couture parisienne» (Paris high sewing), drawn by Gandon, engraved by Jules Piel, France, 1953.
- « La jeune fille de Bora Bora » (The Girl of Bora Bora), Drawn and Engraved by Gandon, French Polynesia, 1955.
- « Les joueurs de cartes » (Card Players), painting by Paul Cézanne, France, 1961. This stamp was part of the first series of paintings that the French Post issued.
- « La Dame à la licorne » (The Lady and the Unicorn), medieval tapestry, France, 1964.

Among the most famous stamps designed and engraved by Gandon are two series of female allegories in common use of the 1940s, 1970s and 1980s:

three French definitive stamps series :

- Marianne de Gandon series issued at the end of the Second World War,
- Sabine de Gandon series inspired by Jacques-Louis David's The Intervention of the Sabine Women, issued during the 1970s,
- and Liberté de Gandon series inspired by Eugène Delacroix's Liberty Leading the People. He was 82 years old when he engraved this stamp.

His last stamp was issued for the Journée du timbre 1983.

In total, Pierre Gandon designed and/or engraved over 350 stamps for France and over double that number for the French Colonies. He designed the first stamps issued by the Central African Republic in December 1959.

== See also ==
Media related to Pierre Gandon at Wikimedia Commons
