= Tony Selmersheim =

French architect (1871–1971)

Joseph Paul Anthony Selmersheim
- Selmersheim in 1925 by Laure Albin Guillot
- Born: 2 June 1871; Saint-Germain-en-Laye, Yvelines, France
- Died: 16 August 1971 (aged 100); Ussy-sur-Marne, Seine-et-Marne, France
- Occupation(s): Architect and decorator
- Known for: Furniture design

Joseph Paul Anthony Selmersheim, known as Tony Selmersheim (2 June 1871 – 16 August 1971) was a French architect and decorator.

== Life ==
Joseph Paul Anthony Selmersheim was born on 2 June 1871 in Saint-Germain-en-Laye, Yvelines. His parents were Antoine Paul Selmersheim, an architect, and Madeleine (or Marie) Victorine Louise Eugénie Naples. His brother was Pierre Selmersheim. He became an architect, and worked with Charles Plumet. Selmersheim worked at La Maison Moderne of Julius Meier-Graefe, whose showrooms displayed rooms decorated in Art Nouveau style, with designers such as Henry van de Velde, Victor Horta, Charles Plumet and Maurice Dufrêne.

By the start of the 20th century the partnership of Selmersheim and Plumet had become the leading Art Nouveau company in Paris. They tried to combine British and Belgian design innovations with French taste. The results could be graceful. However, the buildings they made were not particularly innovative apart from the addition of curvilinear ornamentation, which was unusual at the time. Frantz Jourdain wrote a positive article on Selmersheim in 1904. He noted that Selmersheim felt an architect should also be a designer. He discussed a complete room that Selmersheim had designed, including the structure, decoration and furniture, which succeeded by relieving the inhabitant of the need to concern himself with making his home habitable.

Gustave Soulier considered Plumet and Selmersheim were truly innovative in their furniture designs, which combined workmanship, elegance and functionality. Selmersheim became a member of L'Art dans Tout, a group of decorative artists. Tony Selmersheim died on 16 August 1971 in Ussy-sur-Marne, Seine-et-Marne.

== Publications ==
- Victor Champier, L. Bonnier, Émil Causé, Edme Couty, Jean Baptiste Auguste Dampt, Charles Louis Génuys, René Lalique, Marius Michel, Alphonse Mucha, Henri Eugène Nocq, Charles Plumet, Victor Prouvé, E. Robert, Léon Rudnicki, A. Sandier, Anthony Selmersheim, Etienne Tourette, Gustave Larroumet (1898). Documents d'atelier; art décoratif moderne : album contenant soixante planches en couleur. Paris: Librairie de La Revue des Arts Décoratifs.
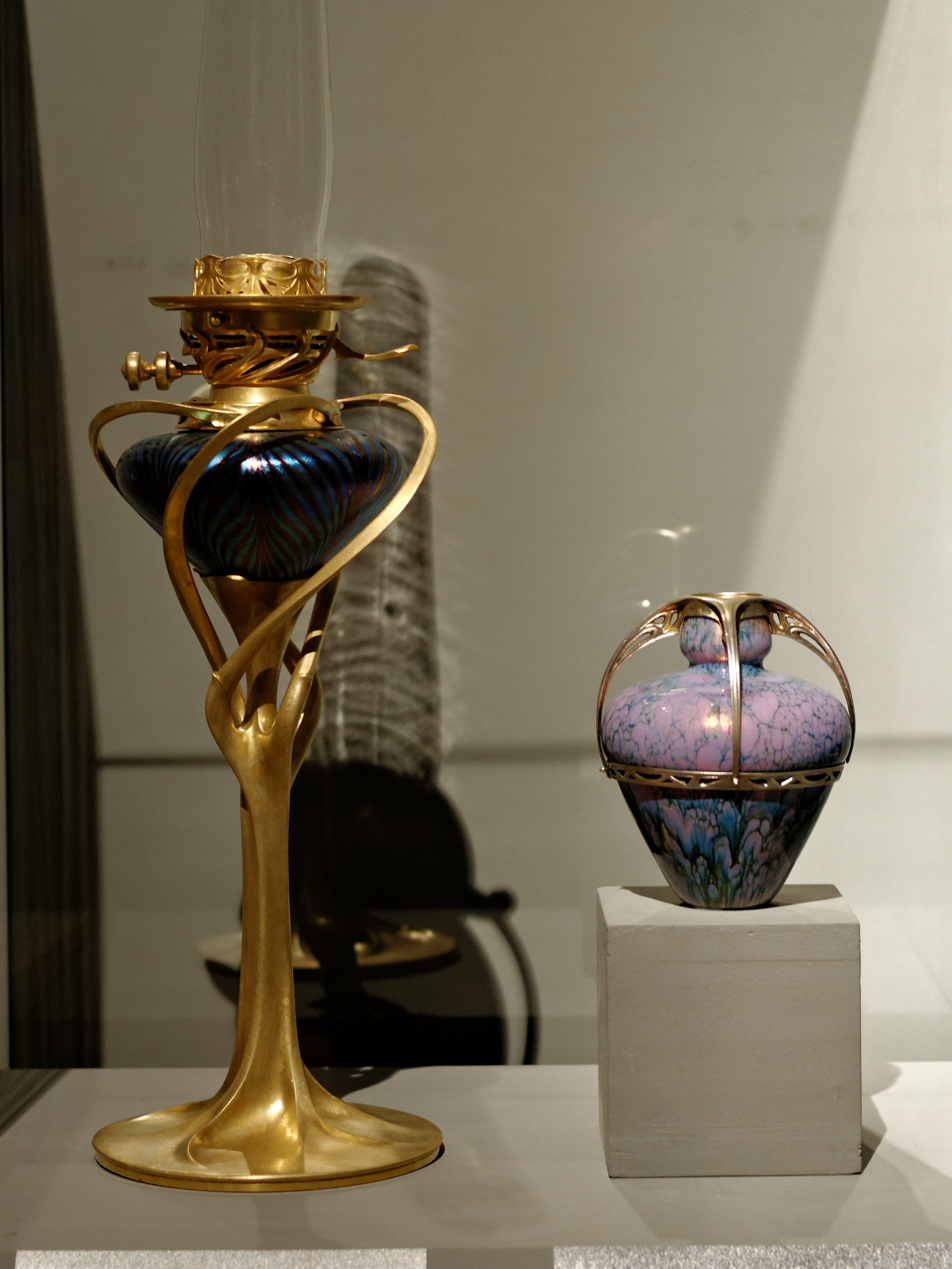
Oil lamp (left) by Tony Selmersheim c. 1898 beside vase by Maurice Dufrêne

== Sources ==
- Hizli, Serdar (2015). "Architecture in Art Nouveau".
- McHale, Gary (2009-10-09). "Maurice Dufrene". Art Deco Designers.
- "Tony Selmersheim" (in French). Musée d'Orsay. 2006.
- Weisberg, Gabriel P.; Menon, Elizabeth K. (2013-09-05). Art Nouveau: A Research Guide for Design Reform in France, Belgium, England, and the United States. Routledge. ISBN 978-1-135-02314-0.
