= Étienne Moreau-Nélaton =

French painter (1859–1927)

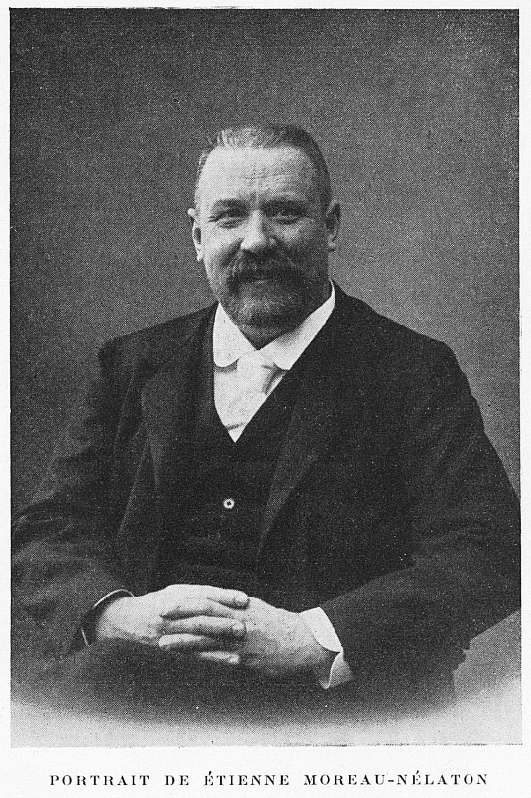
- Étienne Moreau-Nélaton, portrait c.1915
- Born: Étienne Moreau-Nélaton; 2 December 1859; Paris, France
- Died: 25 April 1927; Paris, France
- Known for: Painting
- Awards: Officier

Adolphe Étienne Auguste Moreau-Nélaton (2 December 1859 – 25 April 1927) was a French painter, art collector and art historian. His large collection is today held in its entirety by French national museums.

== Family ==
Moreau-Nélaton was born and died in Paris. His family's art collecting began with his grandfather Adolphe Moreau (1800–1859). As a stockbroker he possessed ample capital with which to buy the work of artists with whom he was personally acquainted, including Eugène Delacroix and Alexandre-Gabriel Decamps. Moreau-Nélaton's father, who was also named Adolphe Moreau (1827–1882), was a high government official and led the railroad company Chemins de fer de l'Est. In 1856 he married the ceramic artist Camille Nélaton (1840–1897), with whom he further expanded the family's collection.

== As artist ==
After an 1882 visit to the École Normale Supérieure, Moreau-Nélaton decided to become a painter. He began his artistic education by studying with the artists Henri-Joseph Harpignies and Albert Maignan, who were friends of the family. In 1885 he exhibited for the first time in the Salon de Paris. His painting style was influenced by Édouard Manet and Berthe Morisot. Domestic family scenes were his primary subject matter, but he also painted several landscapes. Some of his works are now in the collection of the Musée d'Orsay.

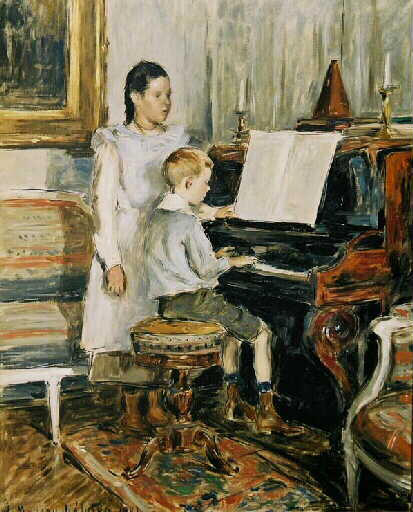
Children at the Piano

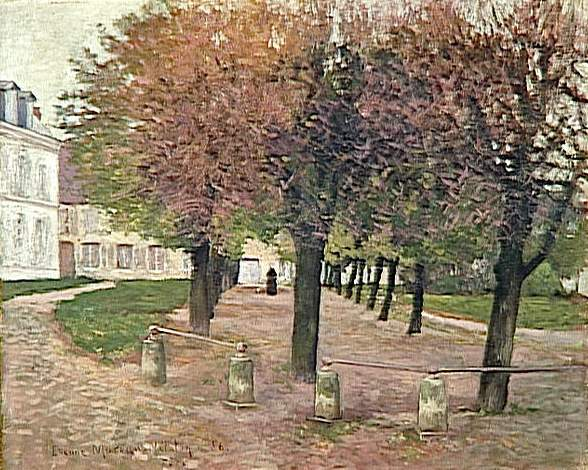
La place de Fère-en-Tardenois

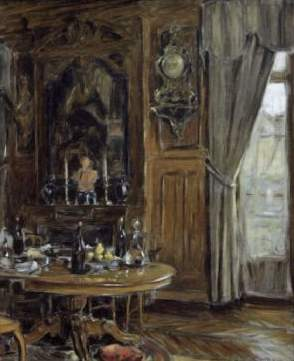
Scène d'intérieur

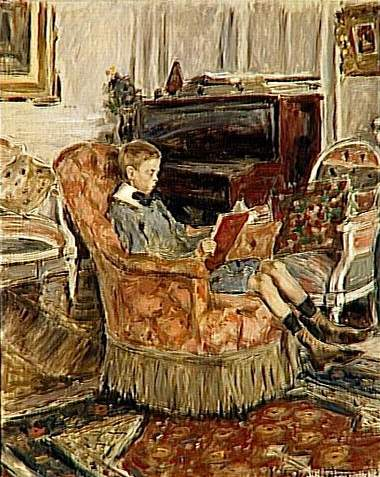
L'enfant au livre

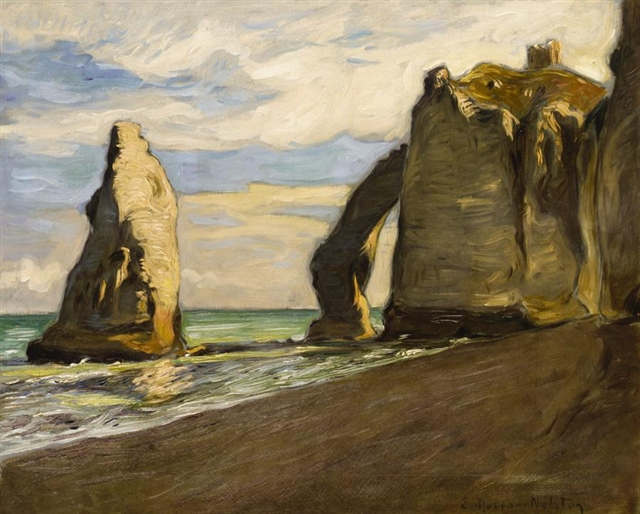
Étretat
Posters published in Les Maîtres de l'Affiche

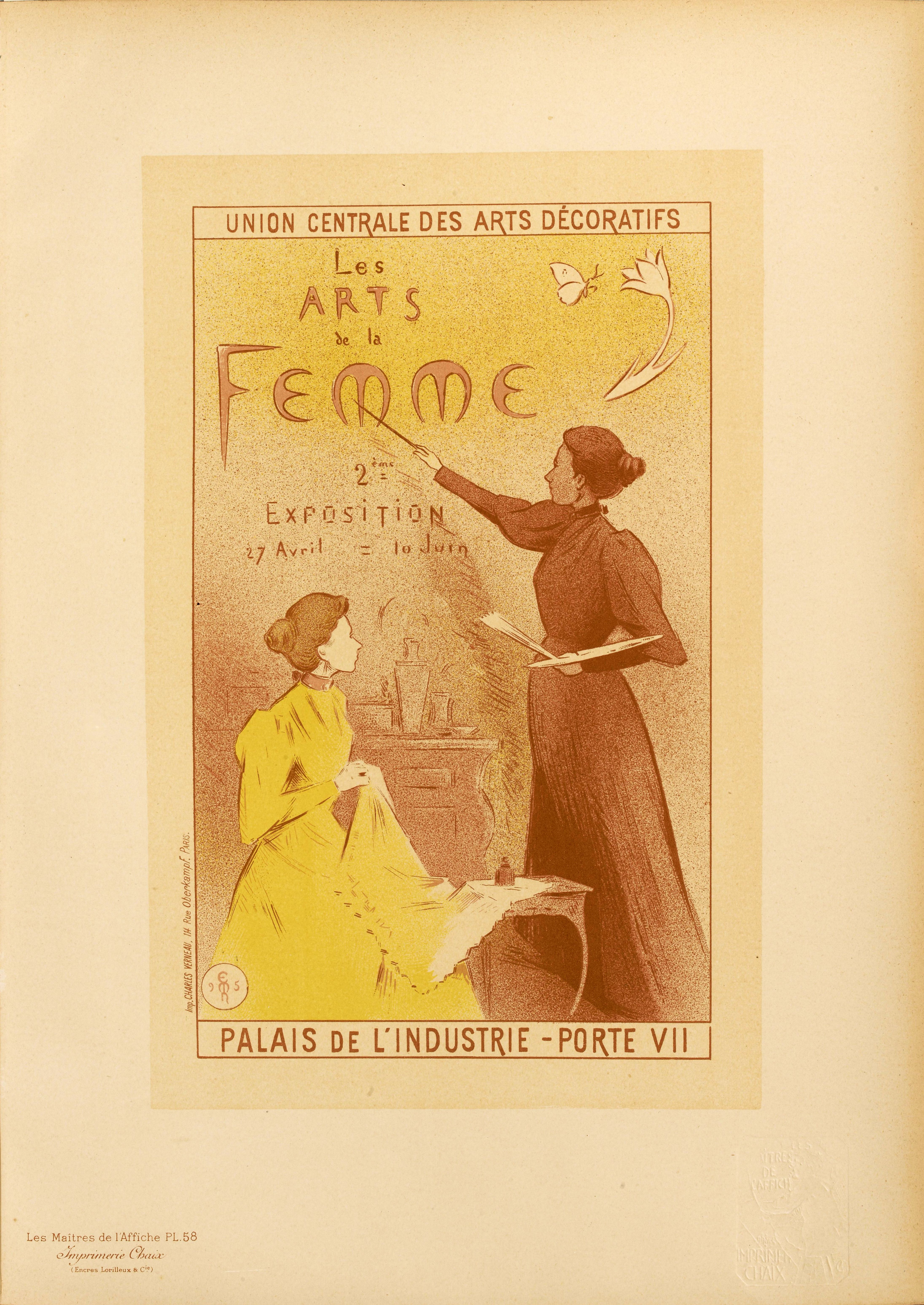
Poster 58

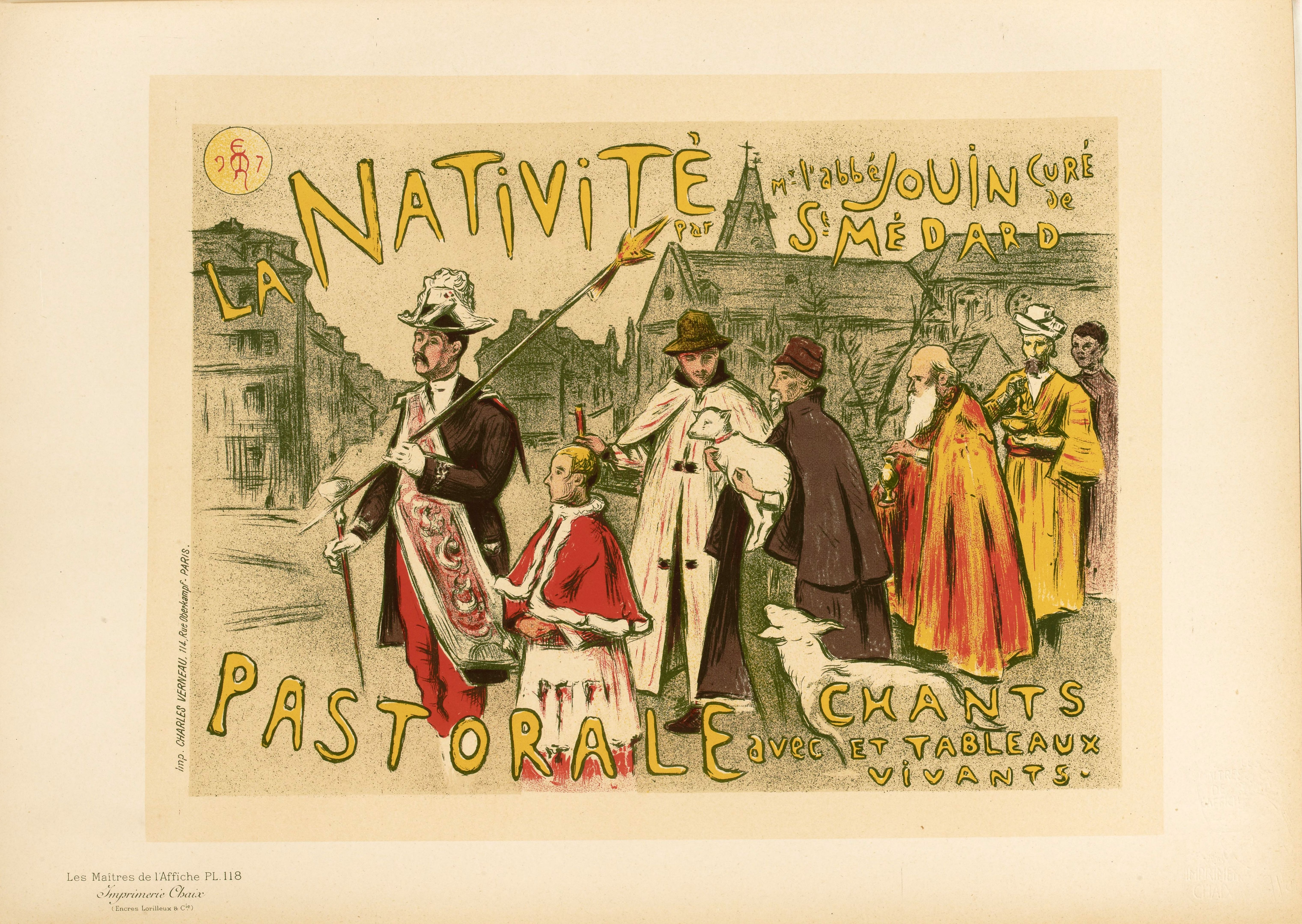
Poster 118

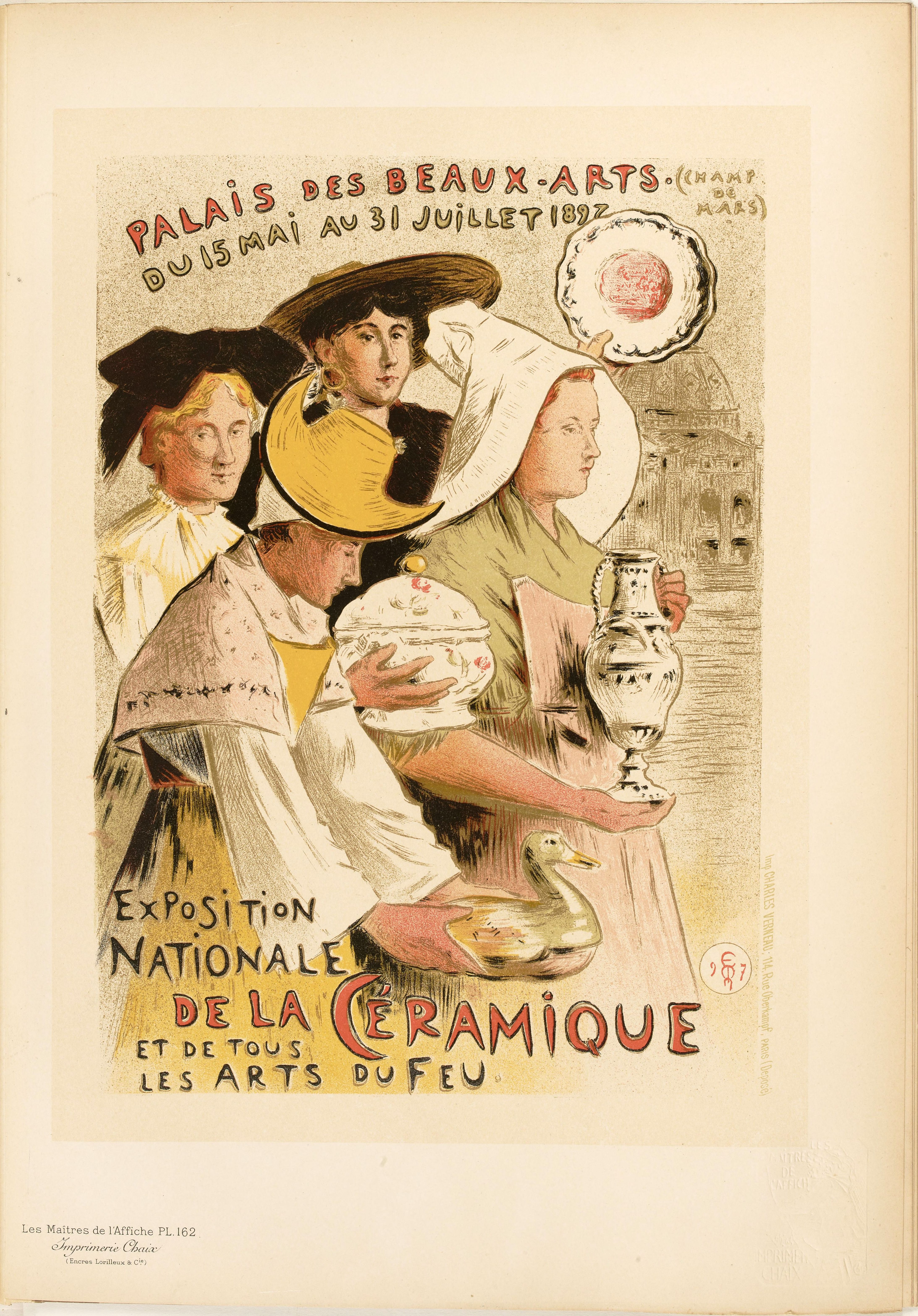
Poster 162

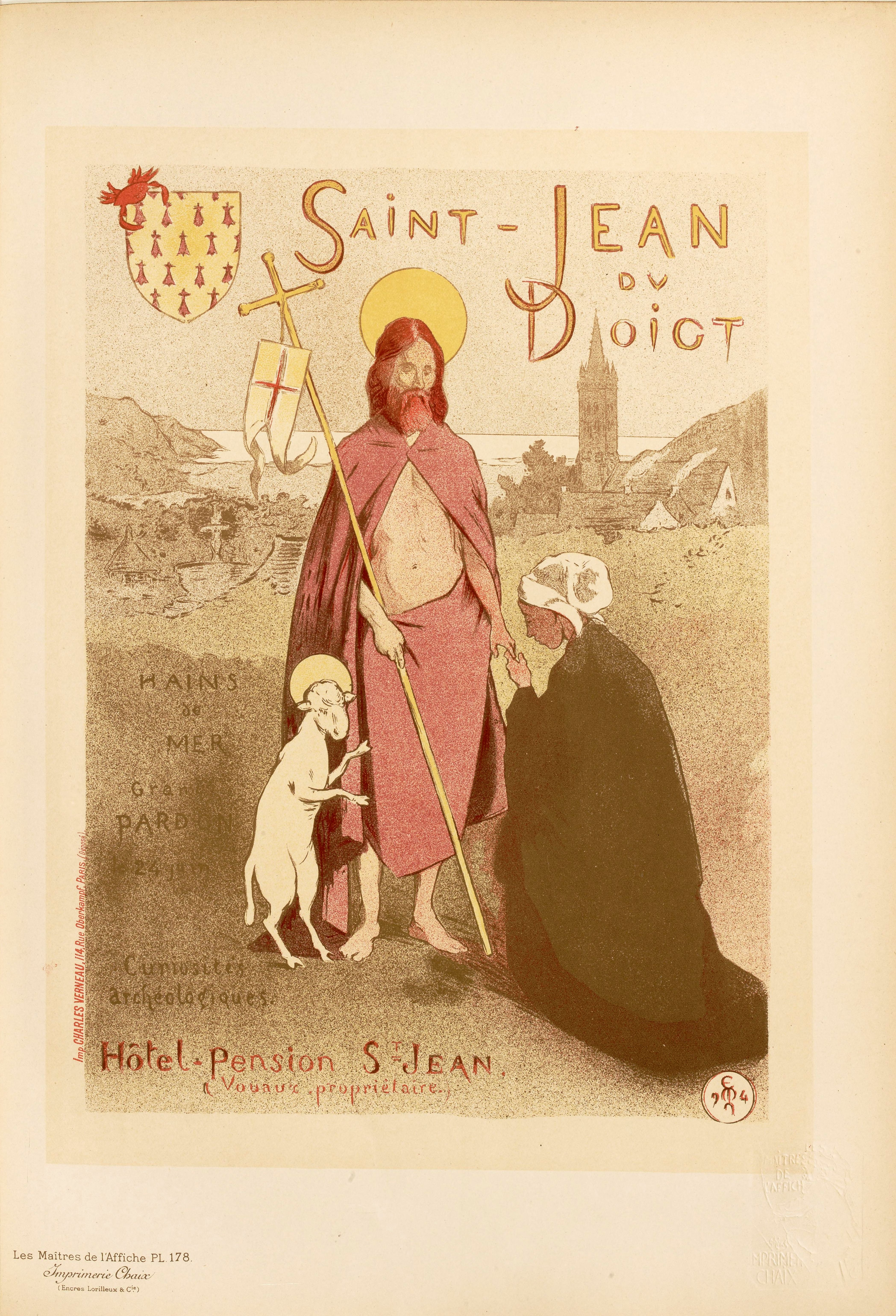
Poster 178

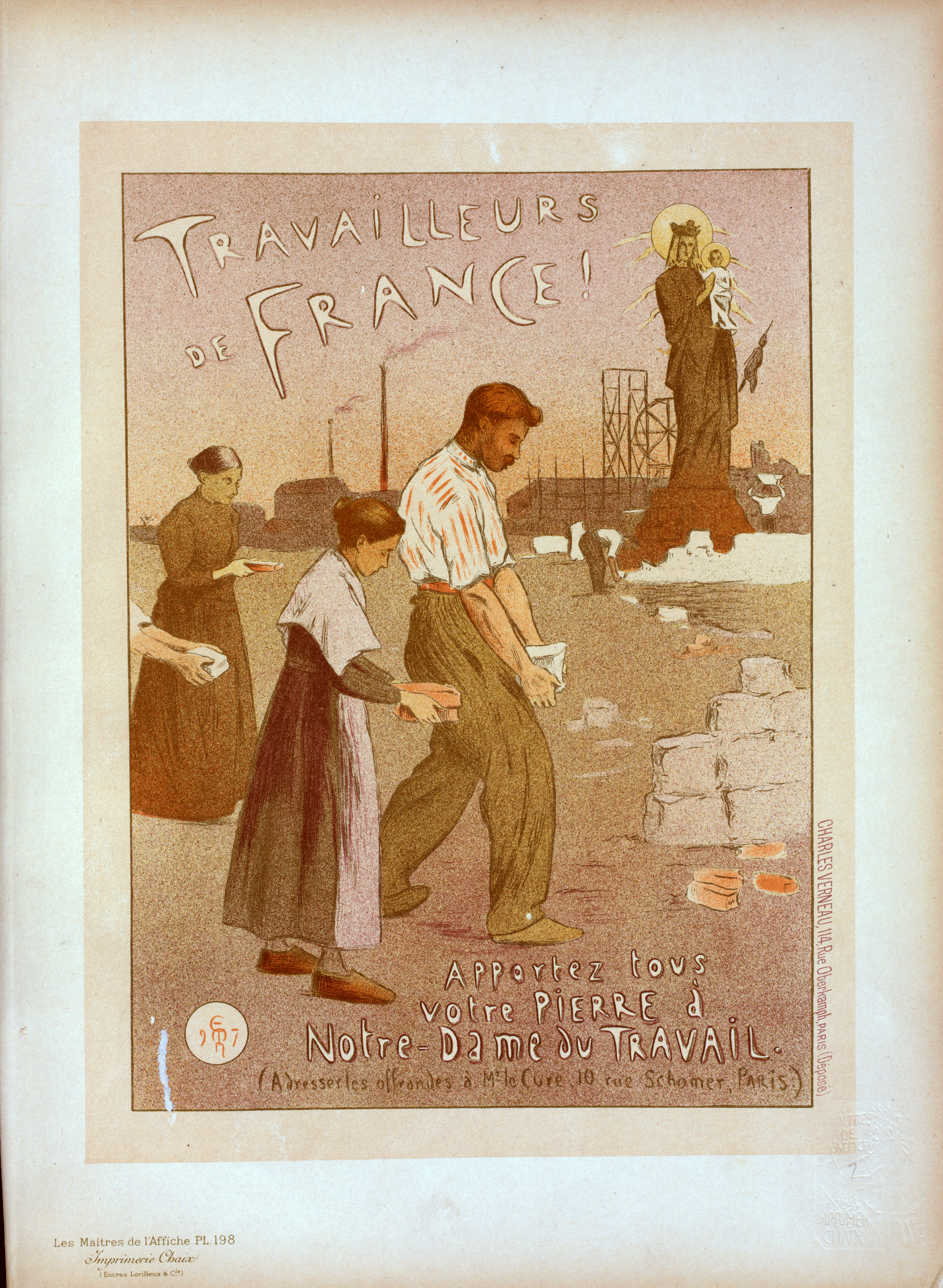
Poster 198

== Collector and patron ==
Despite his artistic output, Moreau-Nélaton was perhaps more important as a collector and patron. He first expanded his family's collection to include paintings by Jean-Baptiste-Camille Corot, Narcisse Virgilio Díaz de la Peña, Constant Troyon, Théodore Géricault, Thomas Couture, Honoré Daumier and Charles-François Daubigny. Works by Henri Fantin-Latour followed, including Hommage à Delacroix. Moreau-Nélaton also belonged to the group of subscribers who secured and purchased Manet's Olympia for the nation of France in 1890. His collection of impressionist painting was especially impressive, with 10 works by Claude Monet alone, including the well-known Poppyfield at Argenteuil. It also included 7 works by Alfred Sisley, 2 works by Camille Pissarro, and 5 works by Édouard Manet, including The Luncheon on the Grass.

Other painters represented in the collection included Pierre Puvis de Chavannes, Pierre-Paul Prud'hon, Johan Barthold Jongkind, Jean-Louis Forain and Eugène Carrière. Most of the paintings were donated to the Louvre in 1906, and today are displayed either there or in the Musée d'Orsay. Further sections of it were willed to state museums after his death. Among these were sculptures by Alfred Charles Lenoir, Aristide Maillol and Aimé Jules Dalou. In addition to all of this he also willed over 3,000 drawings and prints by various artists to the Louvre.

=== Paintings in the Moreau-Nélaton collection ===
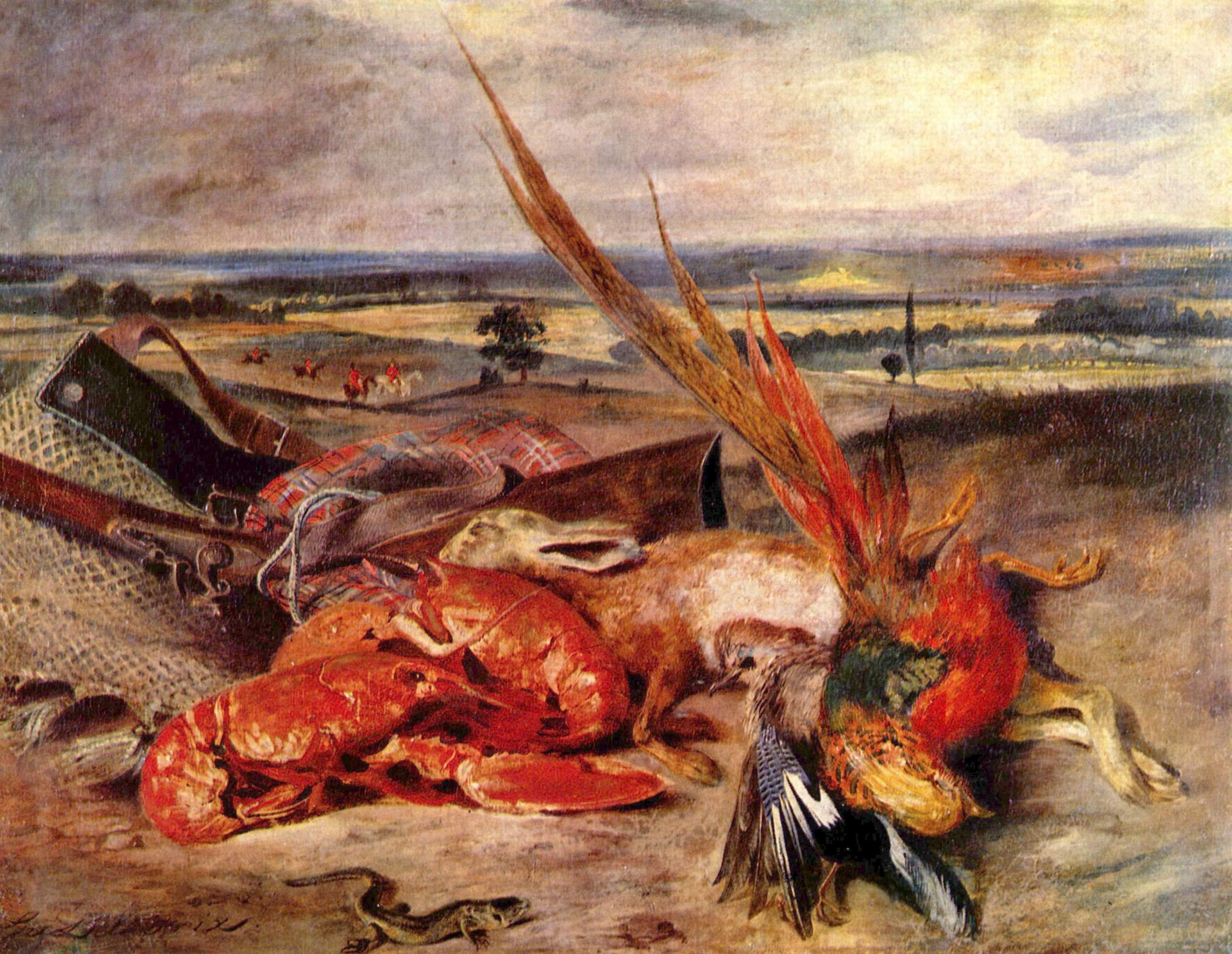
Eugène Delacroix:
Still Life with Lobster and Trophies from Hunting and Fishing

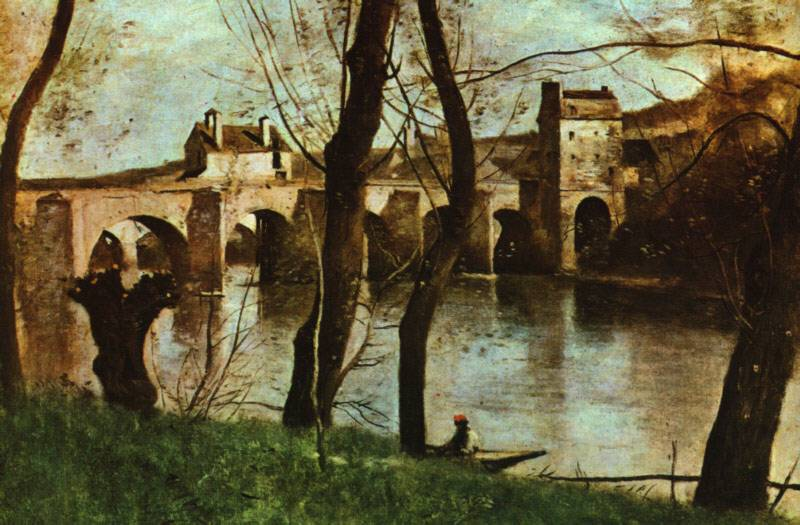
Camille Corot:
The Bridge at Mantes

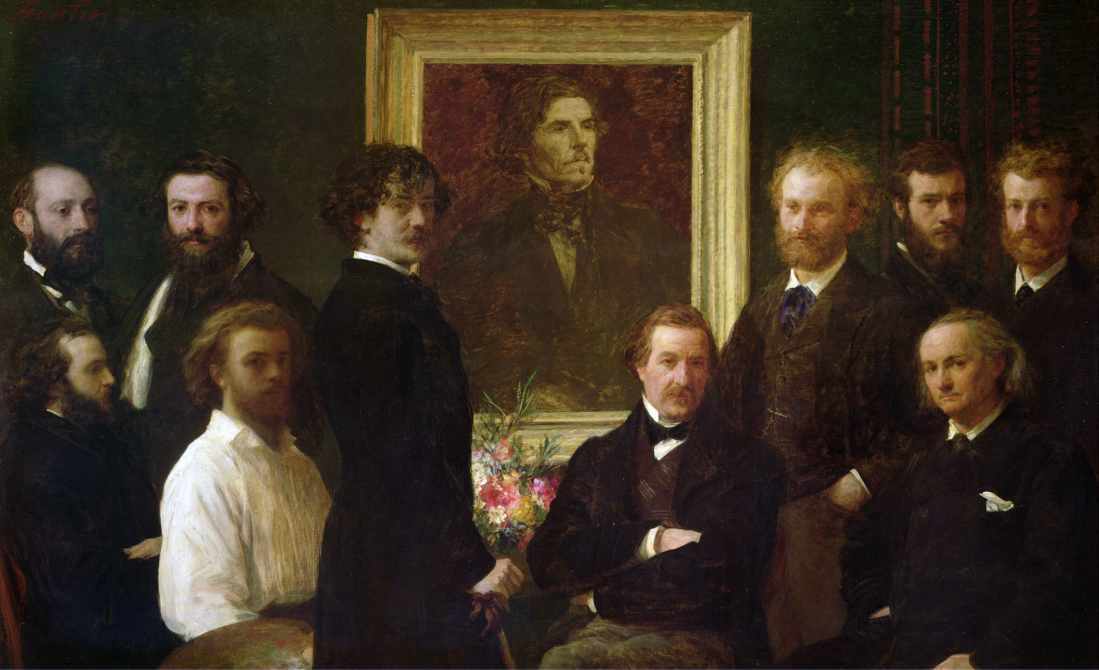
Henri Fantin-Latour:
Hommage à Delacroix

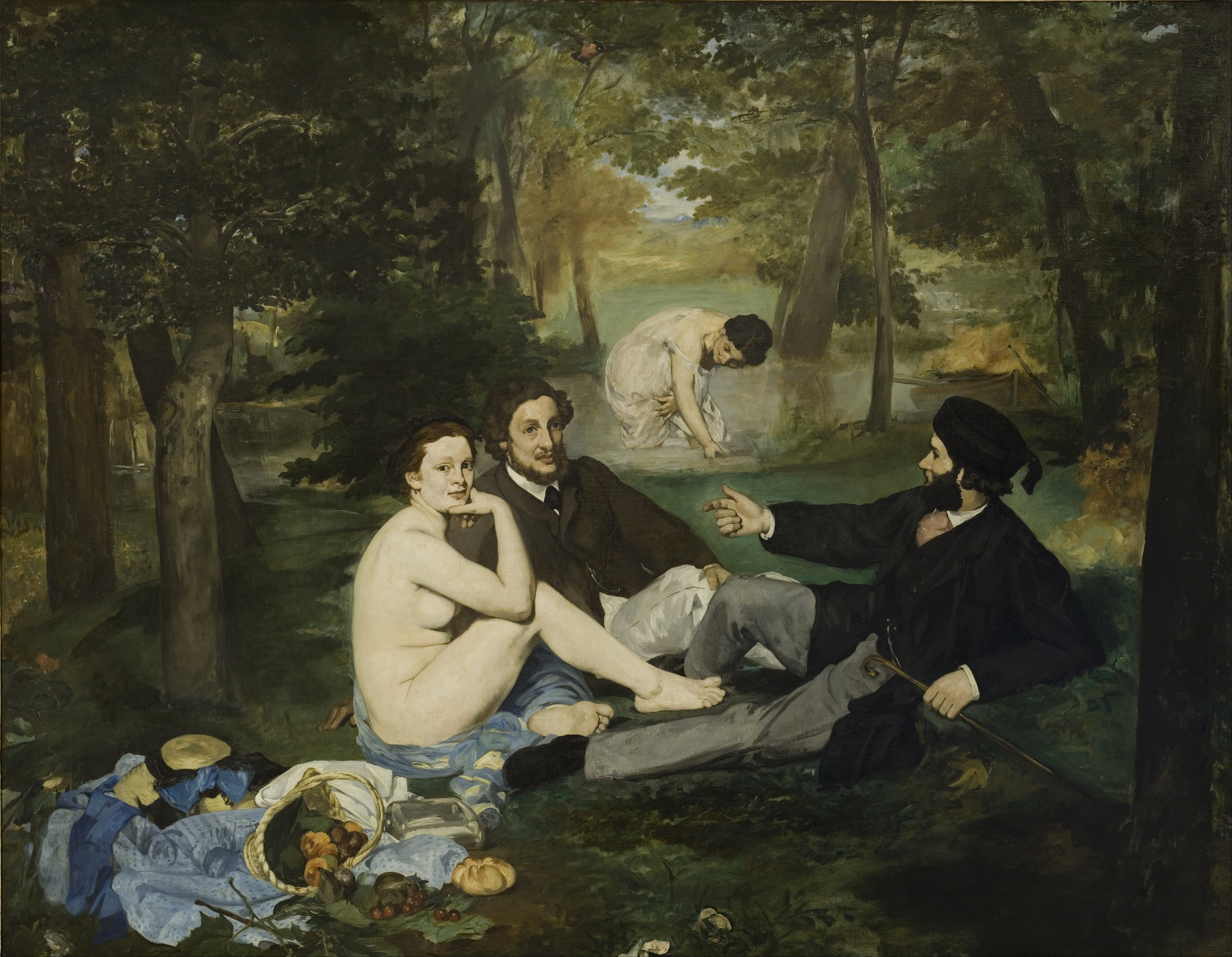
Édouard Manet:
The Luncheon on the Grass

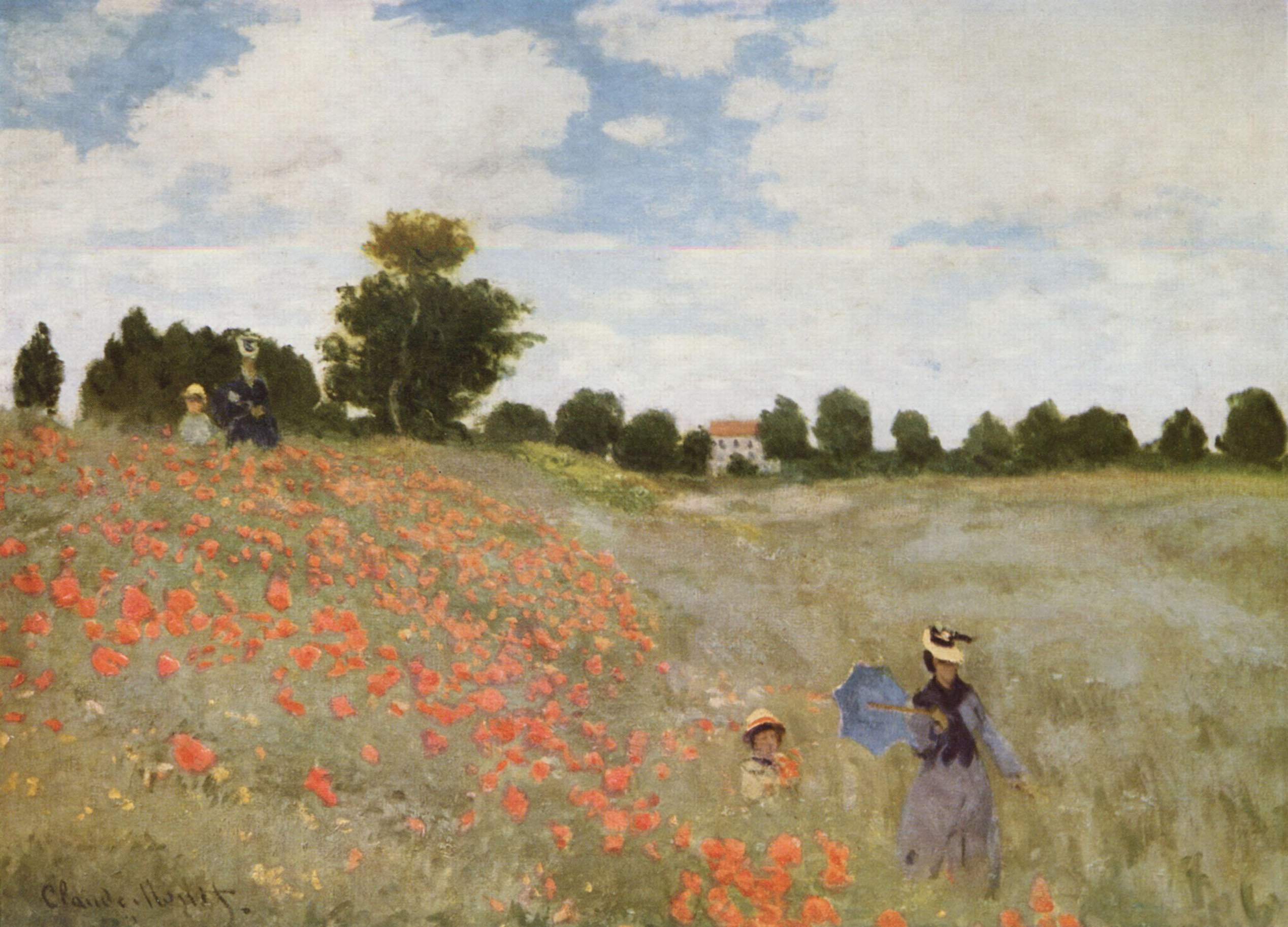
Claude Monet:
Poppyfield at Argenteuil

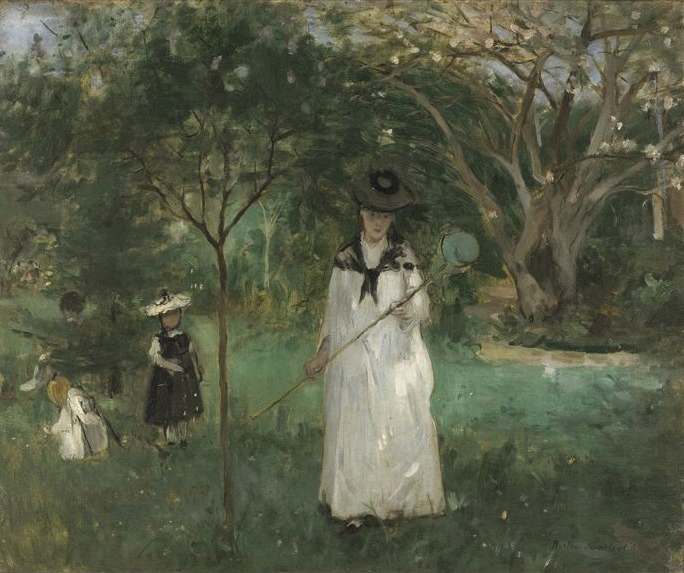
Berthe Morisot:
Butterfly Hunt

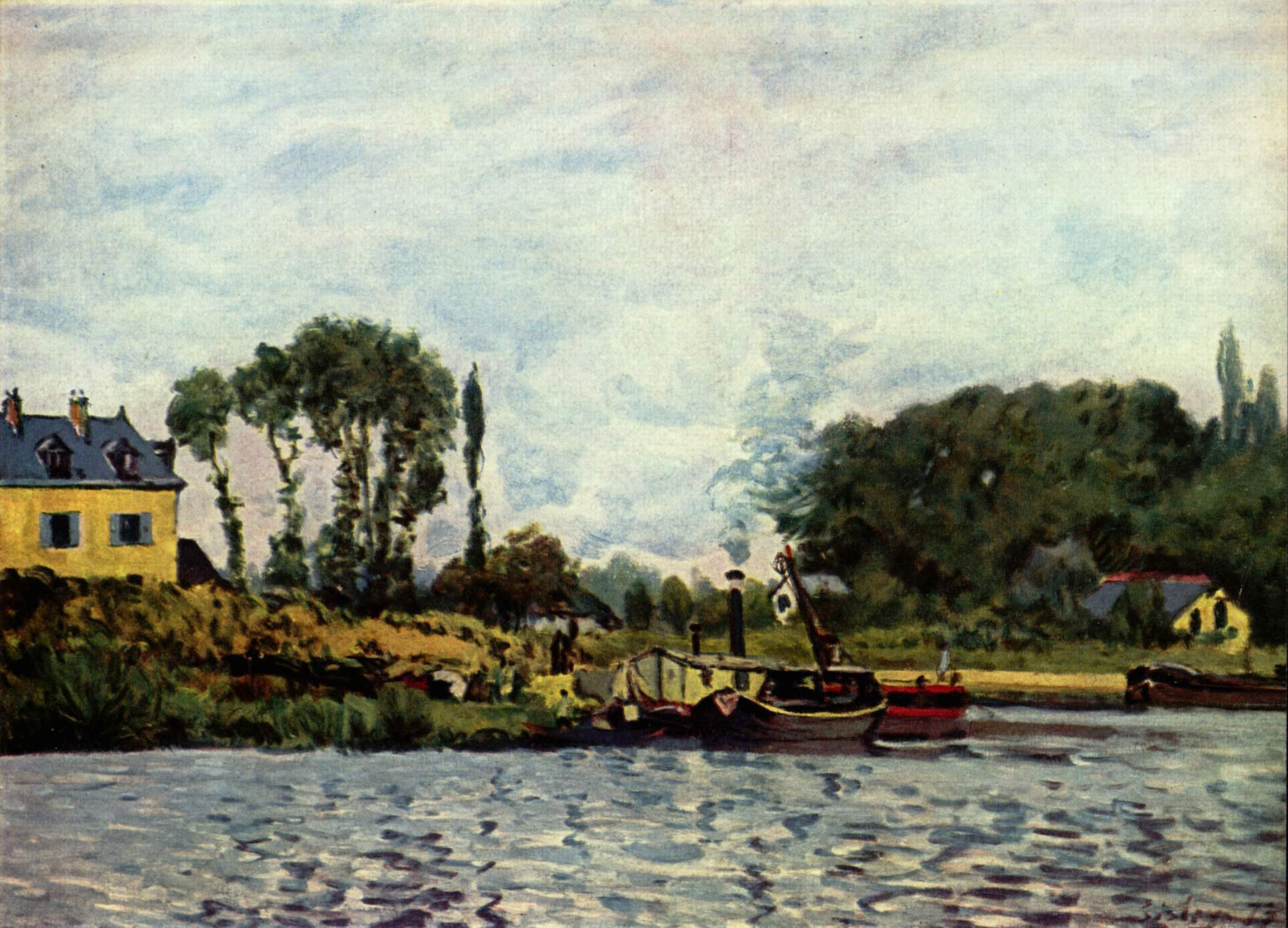
Alfred Sisley:
Boats at Bougival

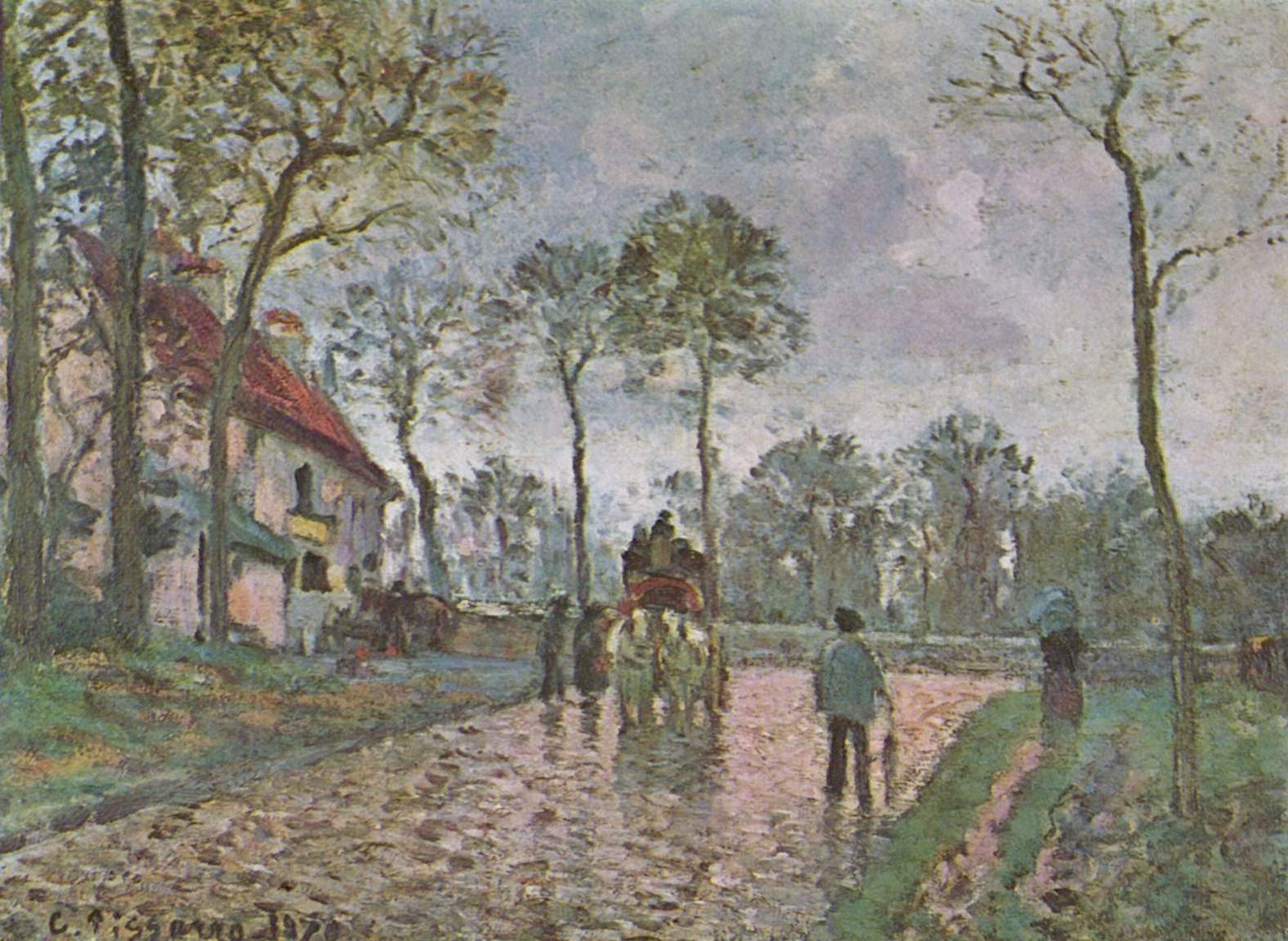
Camille Pissarro:
Post Coach from Louveciennes

== References and sources ==
Sources

- Vincent Pomarède: Etienne Moreau-Nélaton: un collectionneur peintre ou un peintre collectionneur. Association Moreau-Nélaton, Paris 1988, ISBN 2-9502932-0-4
- Réunion des Musées Nationaux (Hrsg.): De Corot aux Impressionistes, donations Moreau-Nélaton. Exhibit Catalog, Paris 1991, ISBN 2-7118-2431-4
- Moreau-Nélaton, Etienne in Grove Dictionary of Art (Online), Oxford University Press 2007–2009.
