= Landais =

Landais may refer to:

- Landais pony, a breed of pony
- Landais (surname)
- Landais dialect
- Landais (region)
- Landais (people)

== See also ==
- Landes (disambiguation)
