= Landes =

Landes, or Lanas in Gascon, means moorland or heath. Landes and Lanas come from the Latin plānus meaning "flat, even, level, plain". They are therefore cognate with the English plain (and plane), the Spanish word llanos and the Italian word piano.

== Places ==
- Landes (department), a department of France
- Landes forest or Landes of Gascony, a natural region in the southwest of France
- Landes, Charente-Maritime, a commune in the Charente-Maritime département
- Landes, West Virginia, United States
- Landes-sur-Ajon
- Saint-Hilaire-des-Landes, Brittany
- Rion-des-Landes
- Centre d'Essais des Landes, launch site for testing military rockets

== People ==
- Landes (surname)

== See also ==
- Cantons of the Landes department
- Arrondissements of the Landes department
- Communes of the Landes department
- Saint-Sulpice-des-Landes (disambiguation)
