= Hermann Brandl =

German engineer

Hermann Brandl (1896 - 24 March 1947), also known as Otto Brandl, was a German engineer and intelligence officer during the Second World War.

== Life ==
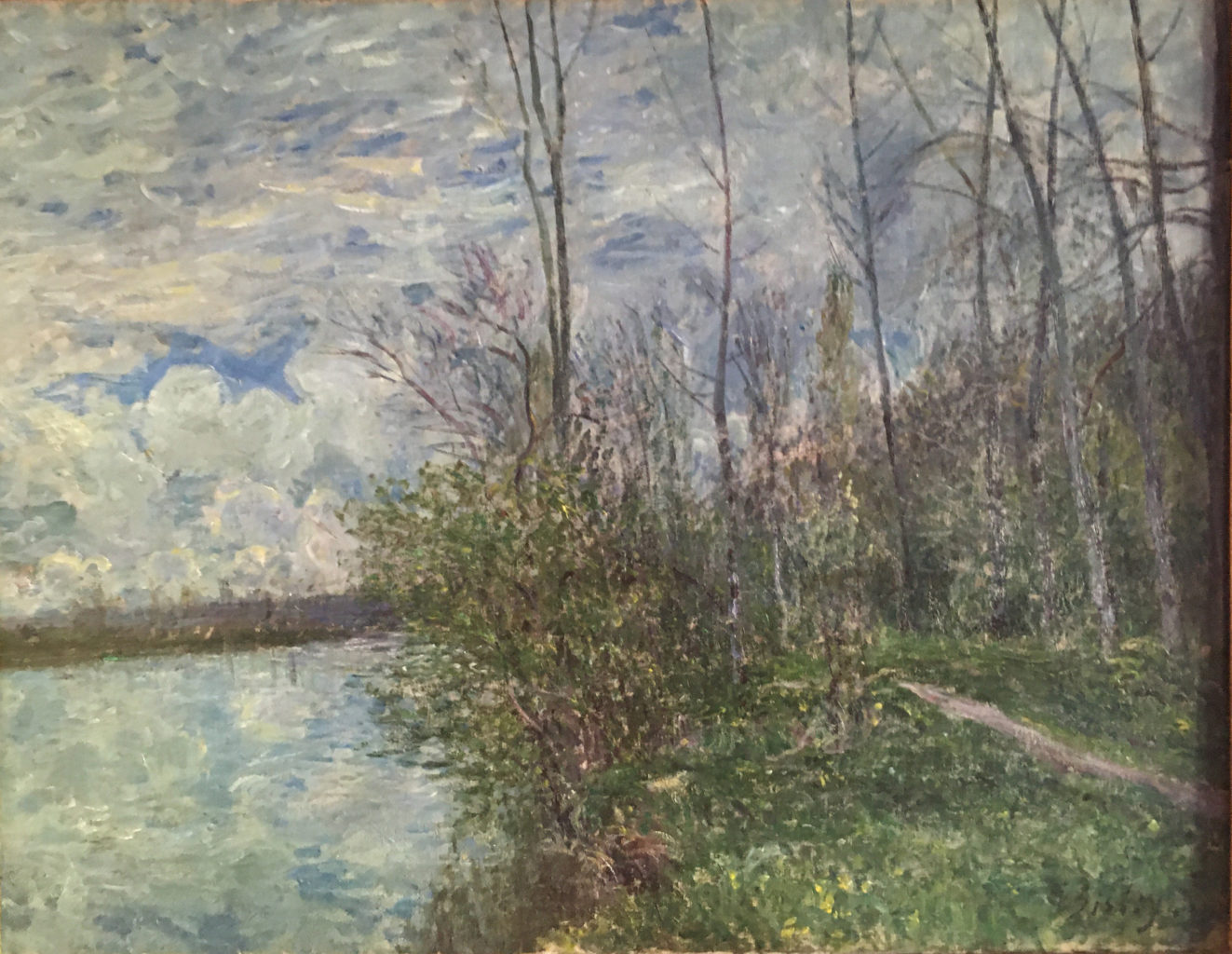
The Small Meadows in Spring by Alfred Sisley.

Born in Bavaria, he became an engineer and set up home in Brussels, where he began his intelligence career. A month after setting up an Abwehr branch at the Hôtel Lutetia in occupied Paris in June 1940, Colonel Friedrich Rudolf summoned Brandl there and made him head of the offices financing and protecting agents.

Known as Abwehrstelle or Ast, the Abwehr had bases in the occupied zone of France at Saint-Germain-en-Laye, Angers, Bordeaux and Dijon. By spring 1941 it was a success, employing 400 people. Everything was done without bills, without knowing the name of the seller or the origin of the goods. The transactions were made in cash. When southern France was also occupied in November 1942, three new bases were set up in Lyon, Marseille and Toulouse. Hermann Göring asked to seize everything he could possibly steal by using or setting up black markets.

From the paintings he bought on the black market or seized 15 were rediscovered in a private house in the Lower-Bavarian hamlet Kölblöd between Munich and Passau in 1949. They included two authenticated Alfred Sisleys, Avenue of Poplars near Moret-sur-Loing and The Small Meadows at By, Stormy Weather and from Claude Monets, Still Life with Pheasant. Brandl was arrested in Munich on 6 August 1945 and imprisoned at Stadelheim. He was discovered hanged in his cell on 24 March 1947.
