= On Meaning =

Jewish podcast

About the Meaning
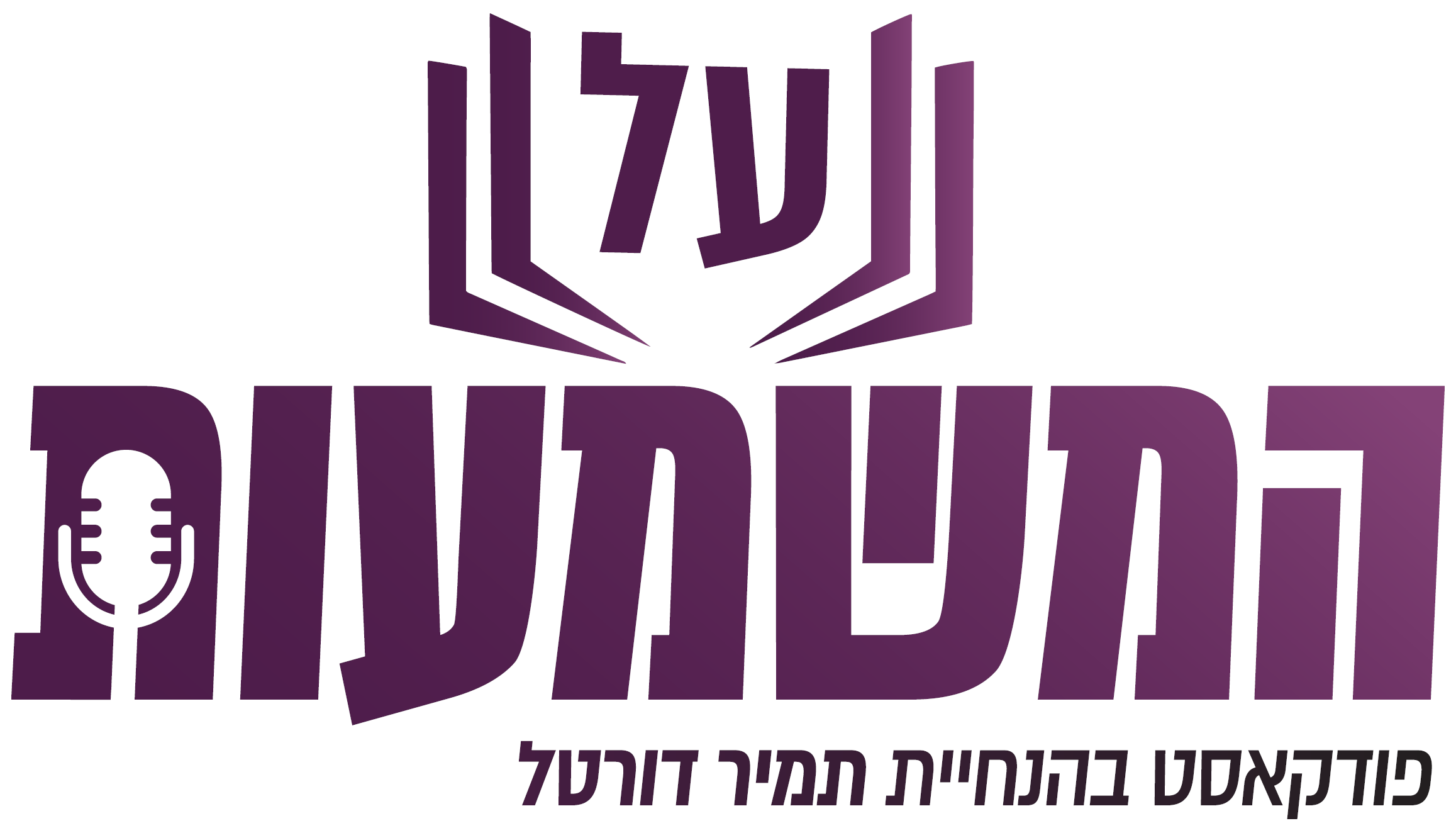
- "On Meaning" – Philosophical pollical podcast
- Genre: Philosophical pollical podcast
- Format: Audio; video
- Language: Hebrew

Creative team
- Created by: Tamir Dortal

Cast and voices
- Hosted by: Tamir Dortal

Music
- Theme music composed by: sa-doc
- Opening theme: Space Fiction

Production
- Length: 60 minutes

Technical specifications
- Video format: YouTube
- Audio format: MP3

Publication
- No. of episodes: 143 (as of June 7, 2021)
- Original release: April 7, 2019

Related
- Website: mashmaut.wixsite.com/podcast

On meaning or About Meaning (Hebrew: על המשמעות, pronounced [al ha'mashmaut]) is a conservative Hebrew political philosophy podcast which examines ideas and philosophers shaping Israeli society today. The podcast was launched in April 2019 by Adv. Tamir Dortal. It has since accumulated over 400,000 downloads and made it to the finals in Geektime website's 2020 competition in the "interviews" category.

== Background ==
Tamir Dortal was interested in Hebrew podcasts on the topics of conservatism, political philosophy, economics and civil liberties. He discovered there were few to none Hebrew podcasts on these topics, and decided to start his own.

== Chapters ==
The podcast addresses issues on Israel's public agenda, including: Civil liberties, Jewish traditions in modern life, Jews and liberal conservatism, family, the welfare state, security, nationalism, Separation of religion and state, European migrant crisis, capitalism, governance, law and democracy, judicial activism, the Middle East and Islamic culture.

Guests have included people such as Ben Shapiro, Victor Davis Hanson and Dennis Prager.

== Production ==
On Meaning's team produces other successful podcasts such as: Hashimua (Hebrew: השימוע – The Hearing), Al Hamilhama (Hebrew: על המלחמה – About the War) and HaMatzbee Menatzeah (Hebrew: המצביא מנצח – The warlord wins).

== Host ==
Adv. Dortal received his law degree from the Hebrew University of Jerusalem and interned at the Yehuda Raveh & Co. law firm. He is a social activist, lecturer/professor and civics teacher. Dortal is also a partner at the Tikvah Foundation and director of the Jerusalem-based Exodus Program. He currently teaches economics at the Shalom Hartman Institute.

== See also ==
- Political podcast
