= David Citadel Hotel =

Hotel in Jerusalem

David Citadel Hotel מלון מצודת דוד
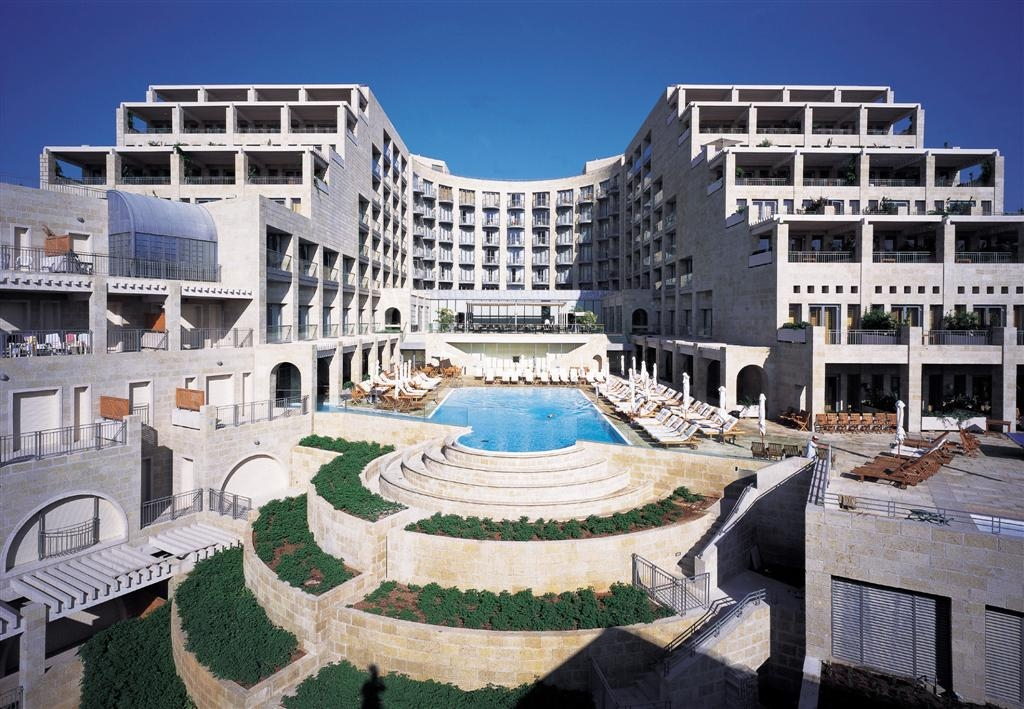

- Location within Jerusalem

General information
- Location: Jerusalem, Israel
- Coordinates: 31°46′37.9″N 35°13′23.4″E
- Opening: 1998
- Owner: Alrov Group
- Operator: Alrov Hotels

Technical details
- Floor count: 8

Design and construction
- Architect: Moshe Safdie
- Developer: Alfred Akirov

Other information
- Number of rooms: 384
- Number of suites: 41
- Number of restaurants: 4

Website
- www.thedavidcitadel.com

David Citadel Hotel (Hebrew: מָלוֹן מֽצוּדָת דָּוִד, malón mezudát davíd) is a luxury hotel on King David Street in Jerusalem, across the street from the Mamilla Mall. It has hosted VIPs, global political leaders, business moguls and celebrities, competing with the nearby King David Hotel and the new Waldorf Astoria for the title of "Jerusalem's flagship hotel".

== History ==
Ribbon-cutting at the entrance of the Hilton Jerusalem, c. 1998; Peter George is second from right

The hotel opened in 1998 as the Hilton Jerusalem, managed by Hilton International. It was officially inaugurated in May 1998 by Alfred Akirov, chairman of Alrov (Israel), which built and owns the hotel, together with the hotel's general manager and Peter George, chairman and chief executive of Ladbroke, which owned the Hilton chain; the guests of honour included President Ezer Weizman. After a business dispute in 2001 between Hilton and Alfred Akirov, managing director of the Tel Aviv-based Alrov hotel and real estate development group, which involved multimillion-dollar lawsuits between the two corporations, Hilton pulled out of managing the property. The hotel, renamed the David Citadel Hotel, is currently owned by Akirov and managed by the Alrov Hotel Group, which controls five luxury properties in Jerusalem, Amsterdam, London and Paris.

People who have stayed at the hotel include U.S. President Bill Clinton and his wife Hillary Clinton, Senator Barack Obama, Senator John McCain, Russian Prime Minister Vladimir Putin and U.S. Secretary of State Condoleezza Rice, who has used the facility to conduct quiet meetings between Israeli and Palestinian peace negotiating teams.

== Design and style ==
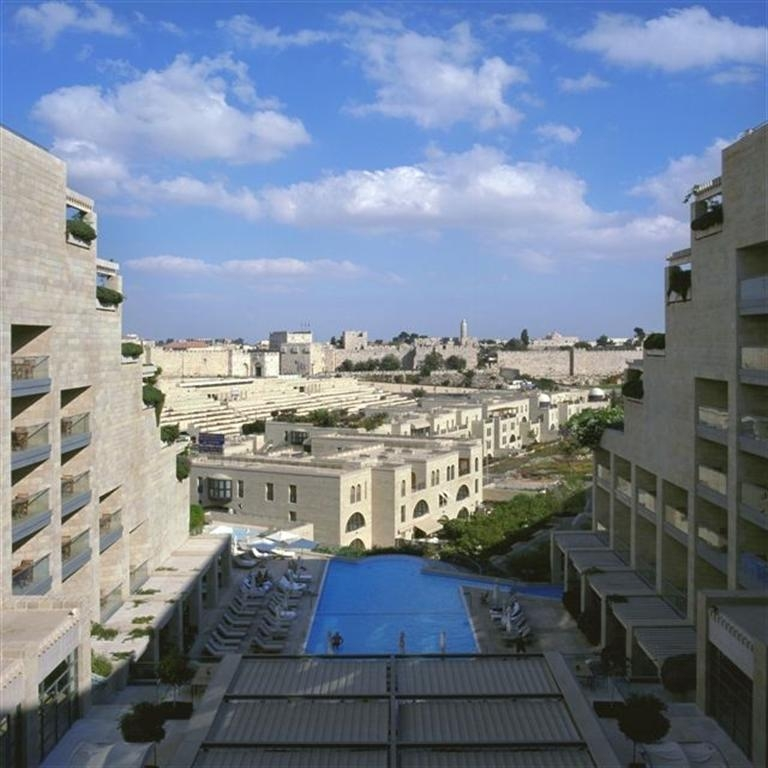
View of the Old City of Jerusalem through the hotel courtyard

The hotel, along with the Mamilla development project across the street, was designed by Moshe Safdie as a U-shaped structure rising 8 stories high with 384 rooms and suites. It has terrace-style suites that overlook the Old City of Jerusalem and the Tower of David. A glass-domed public lobby in the inner part of the "U" was designed by Piero Lissoni. The building sports a neo-Oriental style which blends Middle-Eastern and classic Jerusalem architectural elements.

== See also ==
- Architecture in Israel
