= Alrov Group =

Israeli real estate development company

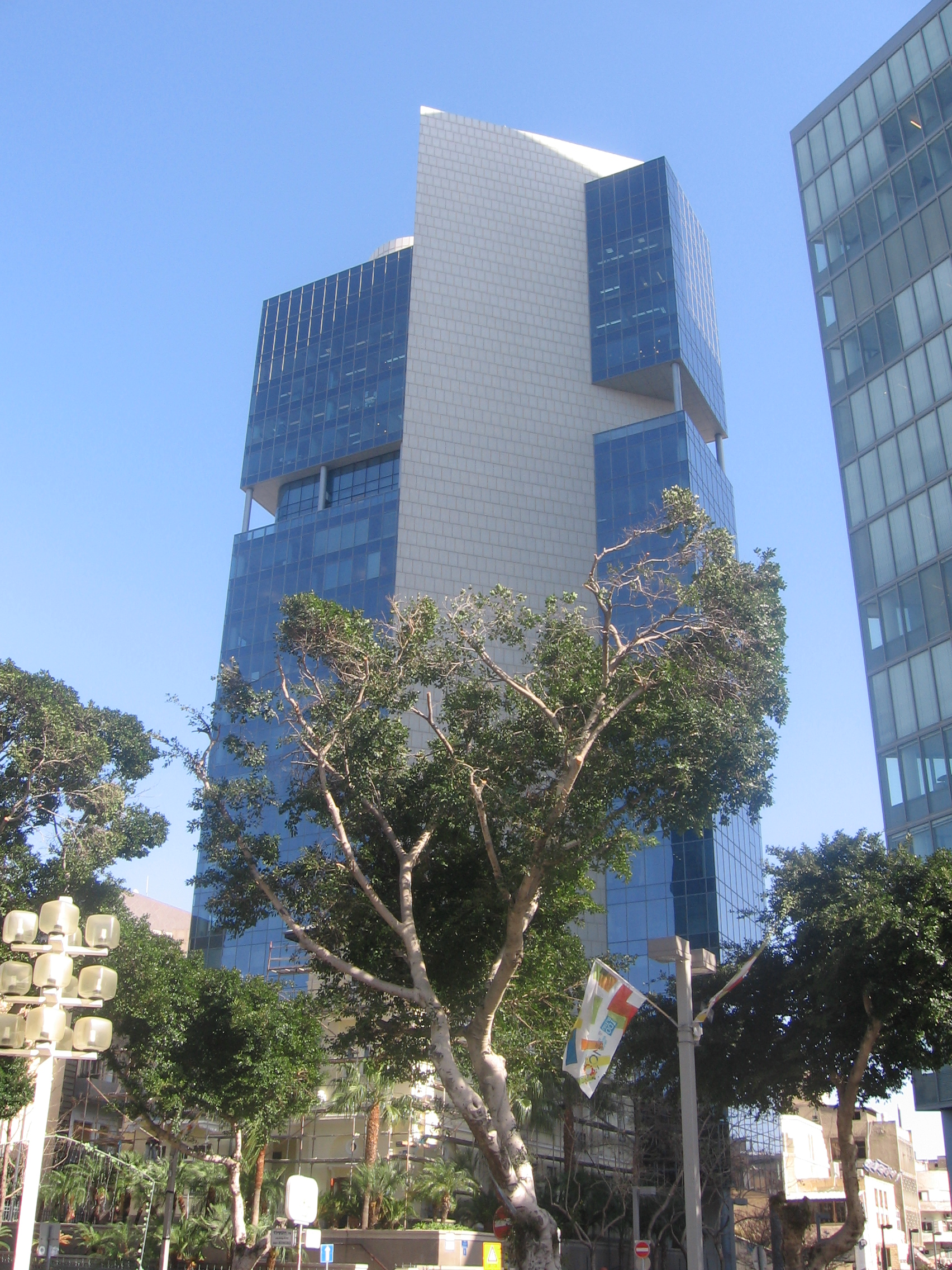
- The Alrov Tower in Tel Aviv
- Type: Public
- Traded as: TASE: ALRO
- Industry: Real estate development, hotels
- Founded: 1978 in Tel Aviv, Israel
- Founder: Alfred Akirov
- Headquarters: Alrov Tower, 46 Rothschild Boulevard, Tel Aviv, Israel
- Number of locations: Israel, United Kingdom, France, Switzerland, the Netherlands
- Area served: Worldwide
- Key people: Shmuel Ben Moshe and Meir Alhacham, co-CEOs
- Website: www.alrov.co.il

The Alrov Group is a real estate development company headquartered in Tel Aviv, Israel. It is listed on the Tel Aviv Stock Exchange.

== History ==
The company was founded in 1978 by Alfred Akirov, who serves as chairman. Its co-Chief Executive Officers are Shmuel Ben Moshe and Meir Alhacham.

=== Mamilla Project ===
In 1995 Alrov purchased the Mamilla Project in the center of Jerusalem and finished the building of the David Village project and the hotel Hilton Jerusalem, that later changed its name to David Citadel Hotel.

The construction and development stopped a few times due to archeological research and legal affairs but resumed in 2006.

In 2007, a part of the Alrov Boulevard (the historic Mamilla street) and the Alrov mall opened. In 2009 Mamilla Hotel was opened and in 2010 the project was completed.

=== Hotels ===
The group owns the David Citadel Hotel and the Mamilla Hotel (near the Mamilla Mall), both of which are in Jerusalem, Israel. It acquired the Conservatorium Hotel in Amsterdam and the Café Royal in London in 2008. In 2010, it acquired the Hôtel Lutetia in Paris.
