= The Small Meadows in Spring, By =

Painting by Alfred Sisley

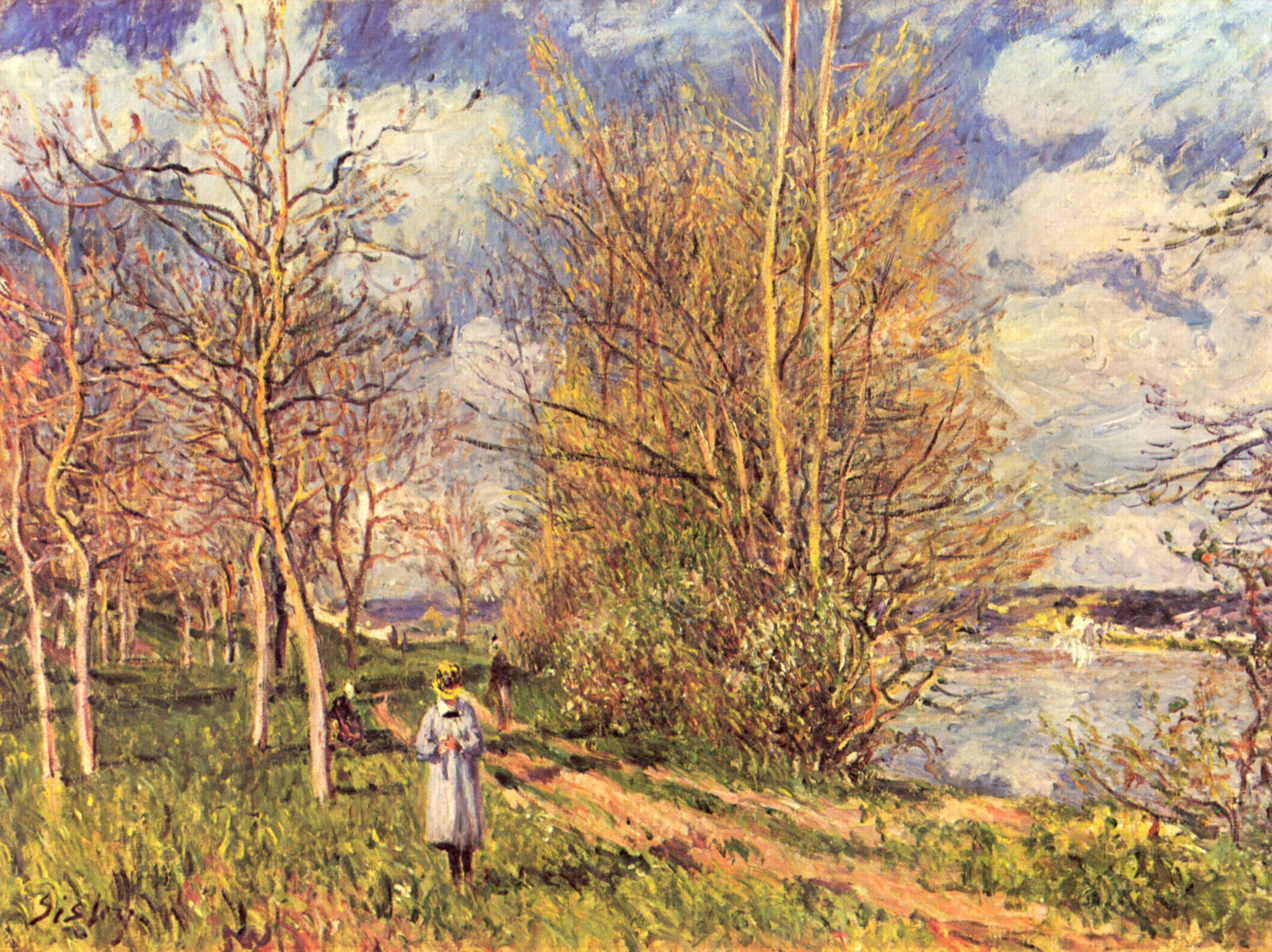
- Artist: Alfred Sisley
- Year: c. 1881
- Medium: oil on canvas
- Dimensions: 54.3 cm × 73 cm (21.4 in × 29 in)
- Location: National Gallery, London

The Small Meadows in Spring, By (French Les Petits Prés au printemps, By) is an 1881 painting by Alfred Sisley, on loan from Tate Britain to the National Gallery since 1997.

The location it shows is now paved, but was then a wooded path along the left bank of the Seine linking the villages of Veneux-les-Sablons and By, with Champagne-sur-Seine in the right background and a young girl just left of centre, probably the artist's twelve-year-old daughter Jeanne. The same path appears in mirror-image in his The Small Meadows at By, Stormy Weather.

== Production ==
In 1880 financial difficulties forced Sisley to leave Sèvres and in 1882 he set up home in Moret-sur-Loing to the south-east of Paris, where he spent the rest of his life. Before definitively settling in Moret, he also painted several works in the area around Veneux-les-Sablons. This also marked a turning-point in his oeuvre, giving his landscapes a vitality and incomparable freshness.

It was catalogue number 35 in an anonymous sale at the Hôtel Drouot, curated by Paul Durand-Ruel and the commissaire-priseur Paul Chevalier/. It was later owned by Erwin Davis, before being bought back on 14 April 1899 in New York by Durand Ruel. In 1931 it was owned by Arthur Tooth & Sons, before being presented to the National Gallery in 1936 in memory of Roger Fry. In 1953 the National Gallery assigned it to Tate Britain, which loaned in back to the National Gallery in 1997.

== See also ==
- List of paintings by Alfred Sisley
