= Avenue of Poplars near Moret-sur-Loing =

Painting by Alfred Sisley

- Artist: Alfred Sisley
- Year: 1890
- Medium: oil on canvas
- Dimensions: 62 cm × 81 cm (24 in × 32 in)
- Location: Musée d'Orsay, Paris

Avenue of Poplars near Moret-sur-Loing is an 1890 painting by Alfred Sisley. It is held by the Musée d'Orsay, in Paris.

== Provenance ==
It was rediscovered in a private house in Kölblöd, Bavaria, Germany in 1949 after being bought on the black market or seized by Hermann Brandl. It was returned to France on 3 June that year and assigned to the Louvre two years later by the Office des Biens et Intérêts Privés.

It was then stolen from the Louvre in 1978 but recovered the following year, before being stolen again in 2007 from the store of the Musée des beaux-arts de Nice, then recovered again in 2008. It is now in the Musée d'Orsay in Paris.

== See also ==
- List of paintings by Alfred Sisley
