= Landes (surname) =

Landes is a surname. Notable people with the surname include:

- Aaron Landes (1929–2014), rabbi
- Alejandro Landes (born 1980), film director
- Bertha Knight Landes (1868–1943), mayor of Seattle
- Christy Landes, American physical chemist
- Daniel Landes, rabbi
- David Landes (1924–2013), economist
- Dawn Landes (born 1980), musician
- Jimmy Landes (born 1992), American football long
- Lewis Landes (1891–1972), U.S. Army colonel
- Mark H. Landes (born 1968), United States Army officer
- Michael Landes (born 1972), American actor
- Paul Landes, Israeli lawyer and Mossad official
- Richard Landes (born 1949), historian
- Roger Landes (1916–2008), agent and radio operator during World War II
- Ruth Landes (1908–1991), anthropologist
- Silas Z. Landes (1842–1910), American politician
- Stan Landes (1923–1994), American baseball umpire
- Steve Landes (born 1959), American politician
- Steve Landes (born 1958), American musician, member of Beatlemania and Rain: A Tribute to the Beatles
- William Landes (born 1939), economist
