= The Small Meadows at By, Stormy Weather =

Painting by Alfred Sisley

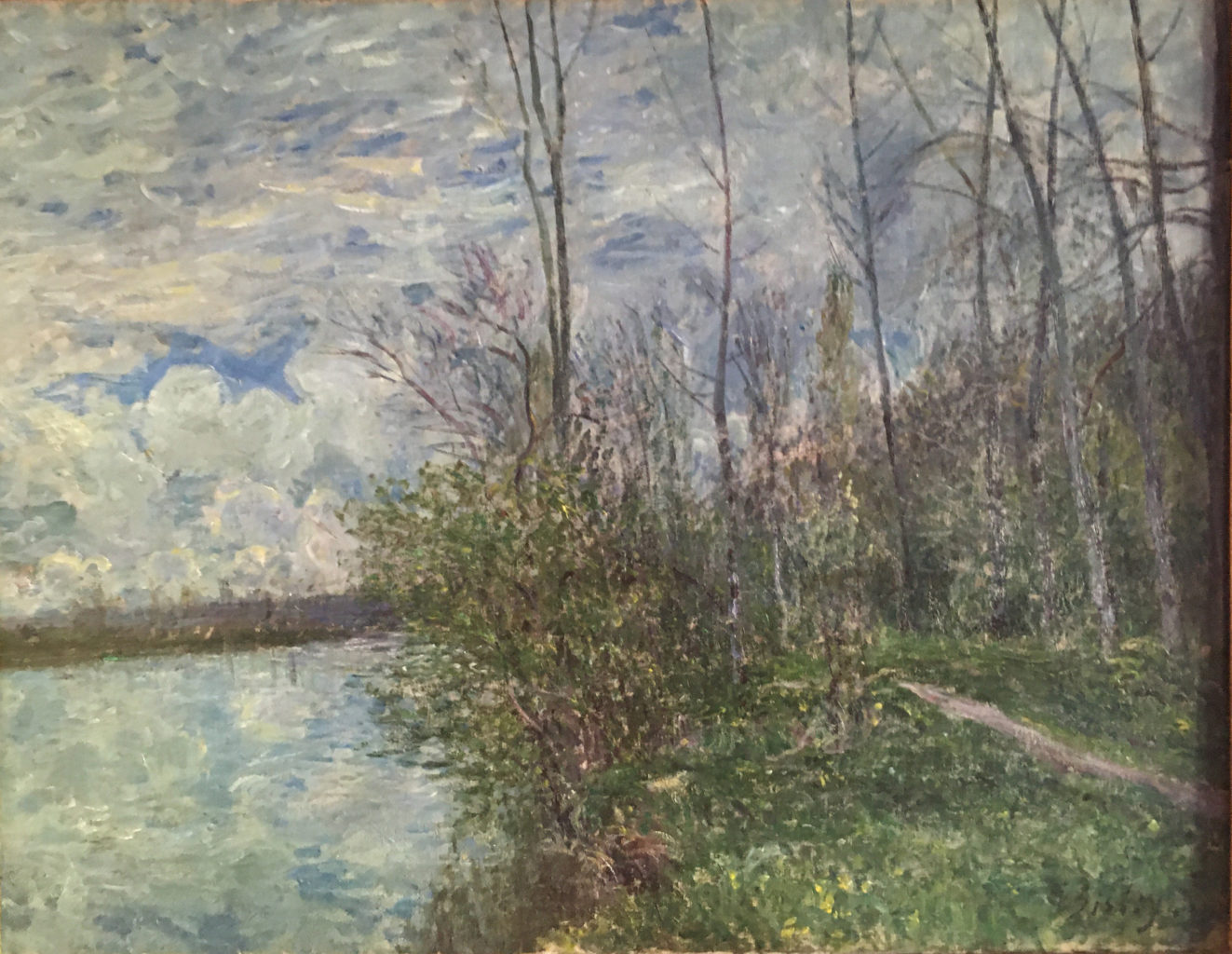
- recovered in Germany in 1949.
- Artist: Alfred Sisley
- Year: 1880
- Medium: oil on canvas
- Dimensions: 54 cm × 74 cm (21 in × 29 in)
- Location: Musée d'art et d'histoire de Meudon; Meudon

The Small Meadows at By, Stormy Weather (D. 405) is a painting by Alfred Sisley, now in the Musée d'art et d'histoire de Meudon. It shows in mirror image the same path as in his The Small Meadows in Spring, By (1881). It was rediscovered in a private home in Kölblöd, Bavaria, Germany in 1949 after being stolen or bought on the black market by Hermann Brandl.

== See also ==
- List of paintings by Alfred Sisley
