= Yehuda Raveh =

Israeli lawyer (born 1944)

- יהודה רוה
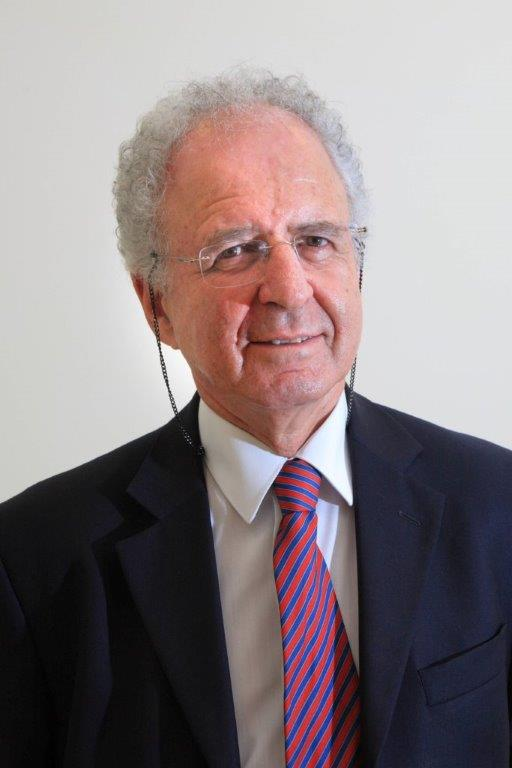
- Born: 1944 (age 81–82); Netanya, Mandatory Palestine
- Education: Hebrew University of Jerusalem, New York University
- Occupations: Lawyer, businessman
- Spouse: Tami Raveh

Yehuda Raveh (Hebrew: יהודה רוה; born 1944) is an Israeli lawyer. He is the founder and the owner of Yehuda Raveh Law Offices and co-founder of the Israel Infrastructure Fund. His office has been involved in many of Israel's largest infrastructure projects.

== Biography ==
Yehuda Raveh was born in Netanya. His parents, Menashe and Chana Raveh, immigrated from Poland in the mid-1920s. His father had a carpentry business. He is the youngest of three brothers, all of whom became lawyers. He attended Bialik elementary school and Tchernichovsky high school. In his school years, Raveh played soccer on the Maccabi Netanya boys team coached by Mordechai Spiegler. He served in the Israel Defense Forces as an officer in 7th Brigade of the Armored Corps. In the reserves, he was promoted to the rank of lieutenant colonel.

Raveh earned a degree in law from the Hebrew University of Jerusalem and clerked with lawyers Yigal Arnon and Shlomo Toussia-Hacohen in Jerusalem.

During his studies he met his wife, Tamar Hausner. The couple moved to New York, where he continued his studies at New York University and worked for a law firm on Wall Street. Raveh's wife is also an attorney. The couple has three children.

== Legal career ==
1972, Raveh returned to Israel and opened a law firm with two partners. He bought the firm from his father-in-law, Gideon Hausner, who founded it in 1940. Yehuda Raveh & Co. has been ranked by Dun & Bradstreet as one of Israel's leading law firms in the hotel sector, project financing, energy and infrastructure, insolvency, building, and construction. Paul Landes, the founder and current Head of the National Bureau for Counter Terror Financing, previously Head of the “Harpoon” at the Mossad, and Head of the Money Laundering and Terror Financing Prohibition Authority, was partner in his office.

== Business career ==
In 1974, five American businessmen established a professional European basketball team with American players which they named Israel Sabres. Raveh was appointed investor representative and president of the Israeli team, which was owned by Livingstone Kosberg. The team played for one year and won the championship. Raveh's first major client was Canadian Pacific Hotels. The president of the company, Donald Curtis, invited Raveh to Toronto to offer a professional opinion on the risk of investing in Israel due to the threat of Arab boycott. Canadian Pacific became one of Canada's largest companies with a turnover of $15 billion. In Israel, the company managed the Jerusalem Plaza Hotel and the Tiberias Plaza. Raveh represented the company throughout its 12 years in Israel. Raveh also represented David Tayag, one of the owners of the Hilton Hotel, who built the Intercontinental Hotel in Tel Aviv, the Hyatt Dead Sea and the Grand Court Hotel in Jerusalem.

Raveh represented David Lewis, owner of the Isrotel chain, from 1980 until his death in 2011, and handled Isrotel's IPO. The Lewis family has invested over 2 shekels billion in Israel, and owns and operates 20 hotels in Eilat, the Dead Sea, Mitzpe Ramon, Tel Aviv, Jerusalem and northern Israel. Raveh also represented the Tamares hotel chain owned by billionaire Poju Zabludowicz.

In 1985, Raveh was hired to represent the Reichman brothers, who financed the construction of Safra Square, the Jerusalem municipality complex. This was Raveh's first public-private partnership (PPP). In addition, he represented the Ladbroke company owned by Cyril Stein, which built the Mamilla Mall in Jerusalem and later Alfred Akirov, who continued the project. Raveh also represented the company established by Stein in 1992 to build factories that would provide employment to immigrants in Israel.

In 1991, Raveh represented Jack Tramiel, owner of Atari, who planned to open a $50 million factory in Israel. Other high-profile clients include George Soros and Michael Steinhardt. Together with his wife Tami, Raveh was one of the founders of Ye'arot Hacarmel, a health resort in Mount Carmel National Park. He represented the Hebrew University in a $45 million project for the construction of student dormitories on Mount Scopus, and PotashCorp, the world's largest potash concern. In 1998, PotashCorp purchased 9% of Israel Chemicals from the Israel Corporation, Israel's largest holding company. From the late 1990s to 2011, Raveh represented Azorim, which acquired Sheraton Hotels, and Isras Investment Company, which developed the property adjoining the Jerusalem YMCA formerly used as a soccer field.

Raveh was involved in the construction of the hotel complex near the Mandelbaum Gate, the Harel Mall in Mevasseret Zion, the media center in the historic building of Shaare Zedek Medical Center and projects in the Haredi sector such as Givat Canada and Kiryat Sefer. He has handled rezoning permits for agricultural land on moshavim and kibbutzim and represented the Israel Nature and Parks Authority.

Raveh represents Mabat LaNegev, which is building IDF training bases in the Negev; clients involved in major class action suits around the world; and real estate developers in transactions such as the purchase of the Azorim real estate firm from IDB, controlled by Nochi Dankner. He represented the MTS Group headed by Lev Leviev, which competed in the tender for the Tel Aviv light rail (which it won in 2007, but which was later canceled by the Israeli government), the Dutch concern Unilever, the perfume sales of Elizabeth Arden and Faberge, the French mobile phone company France Telecom, Samsung of Korea and Hitachi of Japan.

In his book, Morton Mandel describes Raveh as his "principal Israeli legal advisor." Raveh's firm also specializes in insolvency cases.

== Infrastructure projects ==
In 1996, John Beck, owner of the Canadian construction and infrastructure development company Aecon, which built the 407 ETR (Express Toll Route) in Toronto, asked Raveh to establish a consortium to build a similar road in Israel. Canadian Highways, Africa Israel Investments and Shikun & Binui joined forces to build Israel's Highway 6. In 1998, the Derech Eretz Group, a client of Raveh, won the tender for the construction of a 86-kilometer stretch of the Trans-Israel Highway.

Since then, Raveh's office has been involved in many of the largest infrastructure projects in Israel, among them the construction of power plants, desalination plants, the Tel-Aviv light rail, and the IDF training camps in the Negev. Together with Harel Group and Yaron Kestenbaum, Raveh is one of the founders of the Israel Infrastructure Fund, which invests in and manages infrastructure projects in the fields of water, energy and transportation (trains and roads).

== Public activism ==
Raveh represented the World Jewish Congress at the trial of John Demjanjuk. He is chairman of the Association of Friends of the Israel Museum, chairman of the Board of Trustees of the College of Management in Rishon Lezion and a director of the First International Bank. He sits on the board of the children's charity Variety and ALYN Hospital. Raveh was chair of the Israel-Canada Chamber of Commerce. Raveh is a member of the United Nations Economic Commission for Europe which meets twice a year in Geneva. Raveh teaches a course in the legal aspects of project financing at Tel Aviv University.
