= Hôtel Lutetia =

Hotel in Paris, France

Coordinates: 48°51′04″N 2°19′39″E

Mandarin Oriental Lutetia, Paris
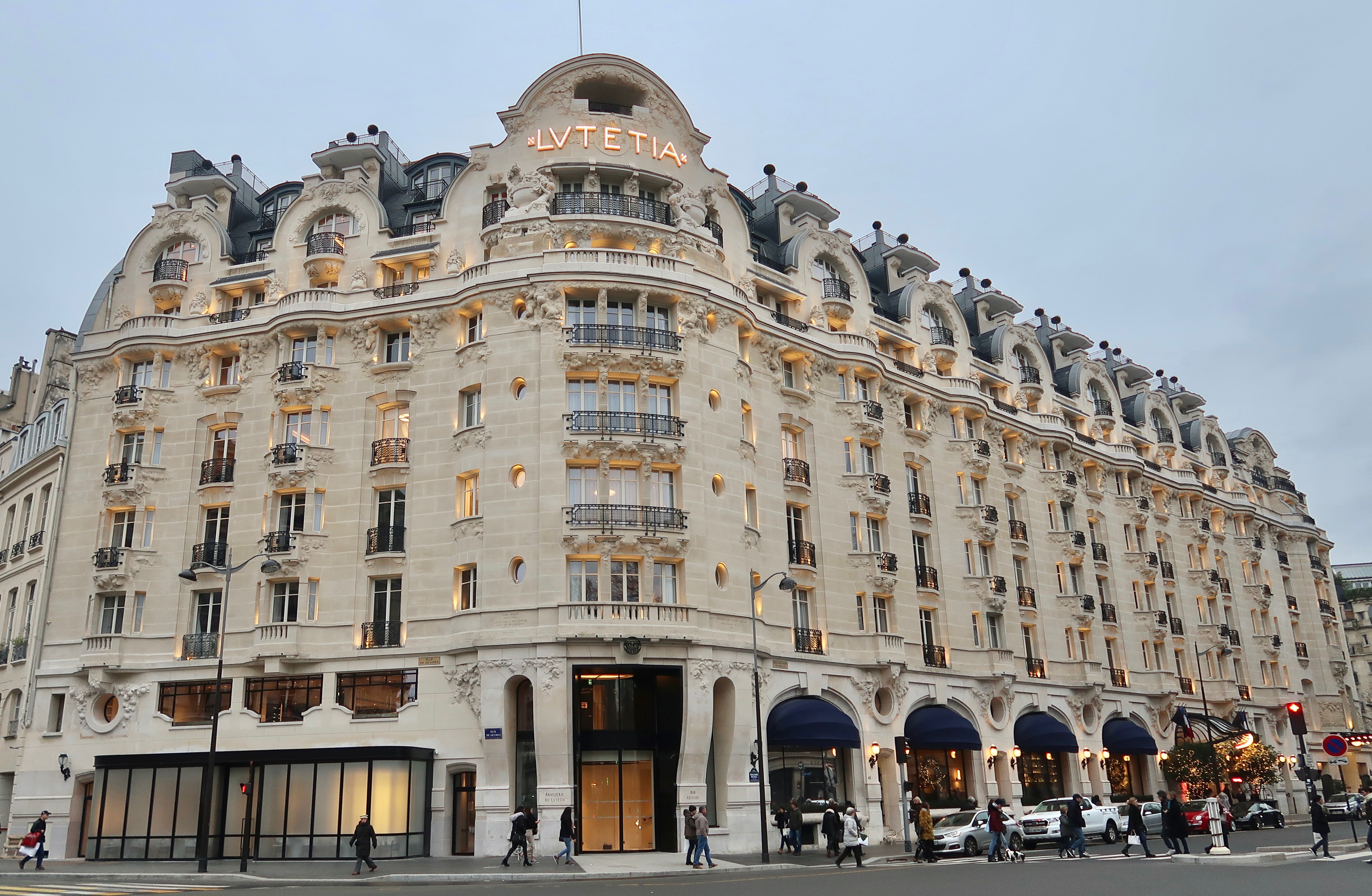
- Mandarin Oriental Lutetia, Paris

General information
- Location: Paris, France, 45 Boulevard Raspail
- Opening: 28 December 1910; 115 years ago
- Owner: Alrov Group

Website
- Official website

The Hôtel Lutetia (French pronunciation: [otɛl lytesja]), branded since 2025 as the Mandarin Oriental Lutetia, Paris, located on Boulevard Raspail, in the Saint-Germain-des-Prés area of the 6th arrondissement of Paris, is one of the best-known hotels on the Rive Gauche. Opened in 1910, it is noted for its architecture and historical role during the German occupation of France in World War II.

== History ==
=== Early years ===
The Lutetia was built in 1910 in the Art Nouveau style to designs by architects Louis-Charles Boileau and Henri Tauzin. It was established by Boucicaut family, owners of the Bon Marché department store, which sits opposite it facing Square Boucicaut. The Lutetia is located at the intersection of Boulevard Raspail and rue de Sèvres, adjacent to Sèvres-Babylone metro station. The hotel is named for an early pre-Roman town that existed where Paris is now located.

Famous guests over the years have included Pablo Picasso, Charles de Gaulle, Marianne Oswald, André Gide, Peggy Guggenheim,Fritz J. Raddatz and Josephine Baker. James Joyce stayed at the hotel in January-February 1940, and it was his final Paris address.Dawn Powell lived at the Lutetia for three months in the fall of 1950, during her only visit to Europe.

=== World War II ===
In the late 1930s, the Lutetia was a frequent gathering place for anti-Nazi German exiles, among them Heinrich Mann, Willi Mutzner and the young Willy Brandt. In the Nazi regime's propaganda of the time, these exiles were disparagingly called "The Lutetia Crowd".

The war began in September 1939, and numerous refugees fled to Paris from conflict areas and places occupied by German forces. The Lutetia attempted to accommodate as many as possible. Because of its reputation, it was filled with a number of displaced artists and musicians. However, the French government evacuated Paris beginning June 14, 1940 and the Germans entered and occupied the city. A number of the Lutetia's residents escaped; others were captured by the Germans. The hotel itself was requisitioned by the Abwehr (counter-espionage), and used to house, feed, and entertain German officers such as Alfred Toepfer and the French collaborator Rudy de Mérode.

When Paris was liberated in August 1944, the hotel was abandoned by German troops and taken over by French and American forces. From then until after the end of the war, it was used as a repatriation center for prisoners of war, displaced persons, and returnees from German concentration camps.

=== Recent history ===
As Paris returned to normality, the Lutetia was restored to its previous state as a luxury hotel. It was acquired by the Taittinger family in 1955. In the late 1980s, designer Sonia Rykiel opened a boutique in the building, and supervised a major redesign intended to recreate the Art Deco style of earlier decades.

Taittinger's Groupe du Louvre controlled the hotel for many years as part of their Concorde Hotels & Resorts chain. Following Taittinger's sale to Starwood Capital in 2005, Starwood sold the Hôtel Lutetia to the Israeli Alrov group in 2010 for 150 Million Euros. Alrov closed the hotel in April 2014 for what was planned as a 100-million Euro renovation. The building's contents were sold at auction in May 2014. It reopened in July 2018, following a $234 million restoration, managed by The Set Hotels group.

The Mandarin Oriental Hotel Group announced a management contract for the hotel in December 2024. The hotel was rebranded as Mandarin Oriental Lutetia, Paris on April 4, 2025.

== Access ==
Hôtel Lutetia is located next to Sèvres–Babylone station of the Paris Metro.

== Bibliography ==
- Assouline, Pierre (2005). Lutetia (Softcover) (in French). Paris: Gallimard. ISBN 978-2070771462.
- Balland, Pascaline; Majani d'Inguimbert, Christophe (2009). Hôtel Lutetia Paris: L'Esprit de la Rive gauche: 100 ans d'un hôtel de légende (in French). Paris: C. Lattès. ISBN 978-2-7096-3335-2.
- Bonnet, Marie-Jo (2025). Lutetia 1945: Le Centre d'accueil et de contrôle des déportés (in French). Paris: Chryséis Éditions. ISBN 979-1091609562.
- Jasper, Willi (1994). Hotel Lutetia. Ein deutsches Exil in Paris (in German). Munich: C. Hanser. ISBN 3-44617832-5.
- Rogoyska, Jane (2026). Hotel Exile: Paris in the Shadow of War (Hardcover). New York: W. W. Norton & Company. ISBN 978-1324089902.

== Gallery ==
Hôtel Lutetia

Hôtel Lutetia

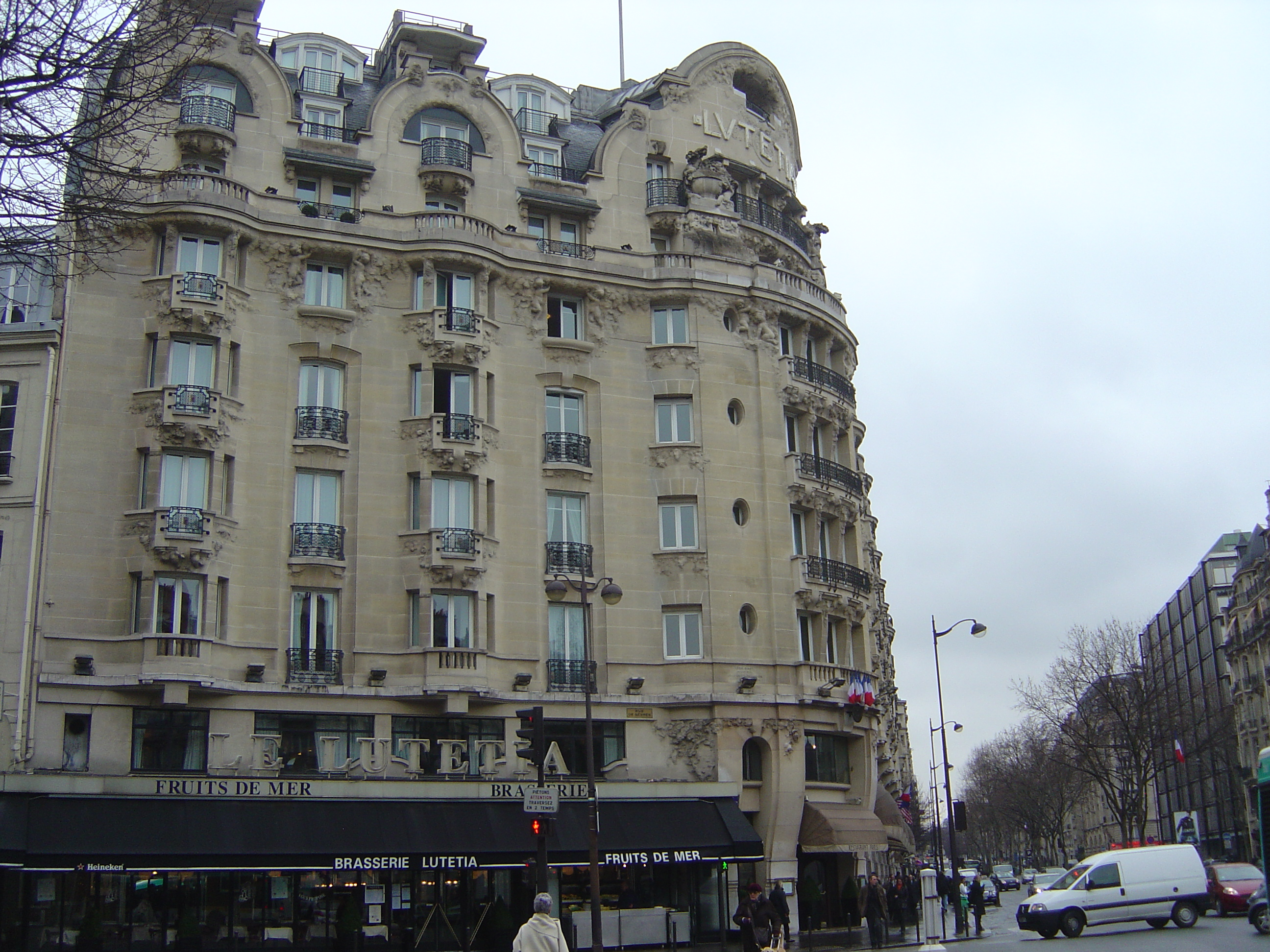
Hôtel Lutetia

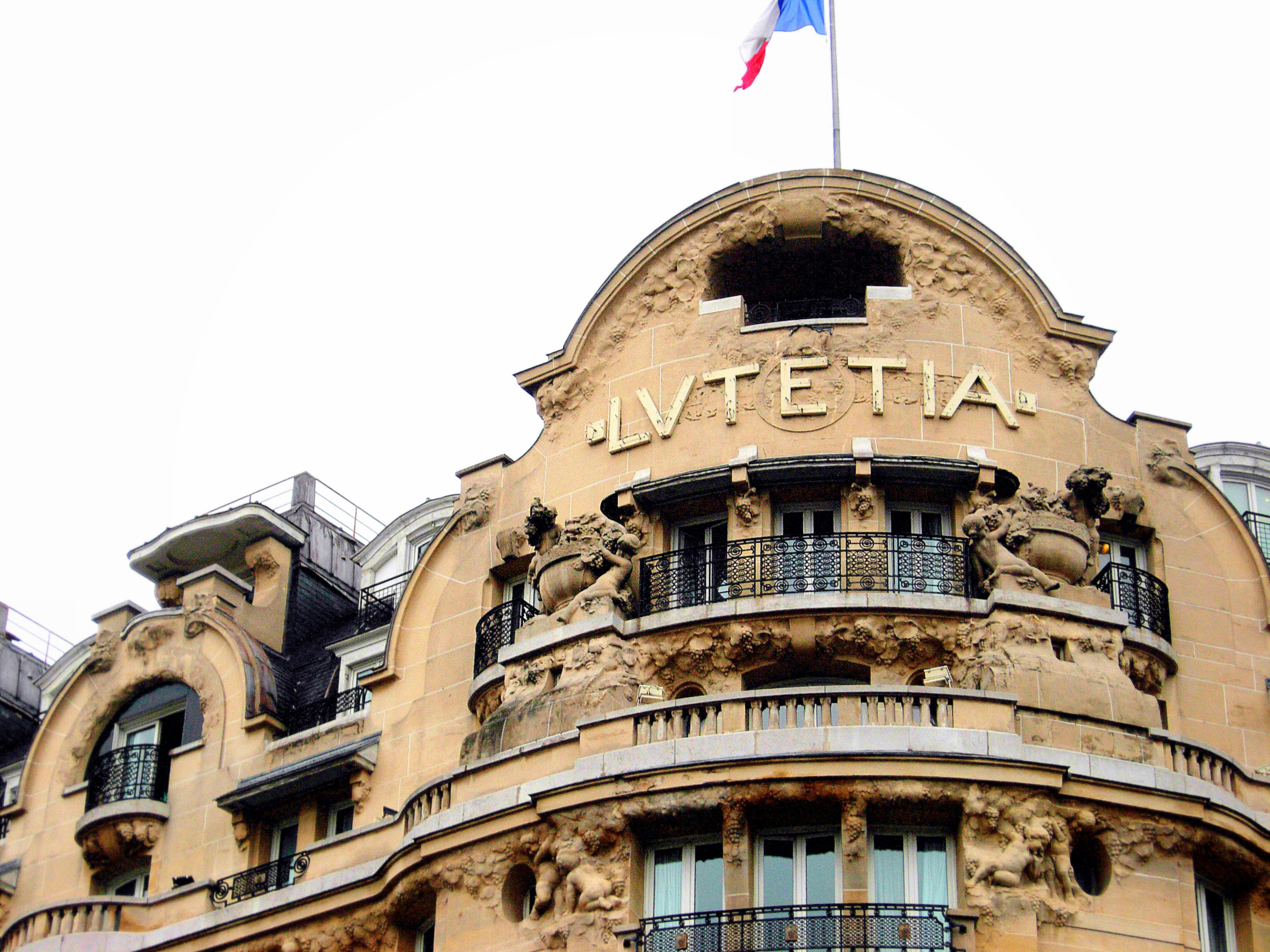
Hôtel Lutetia

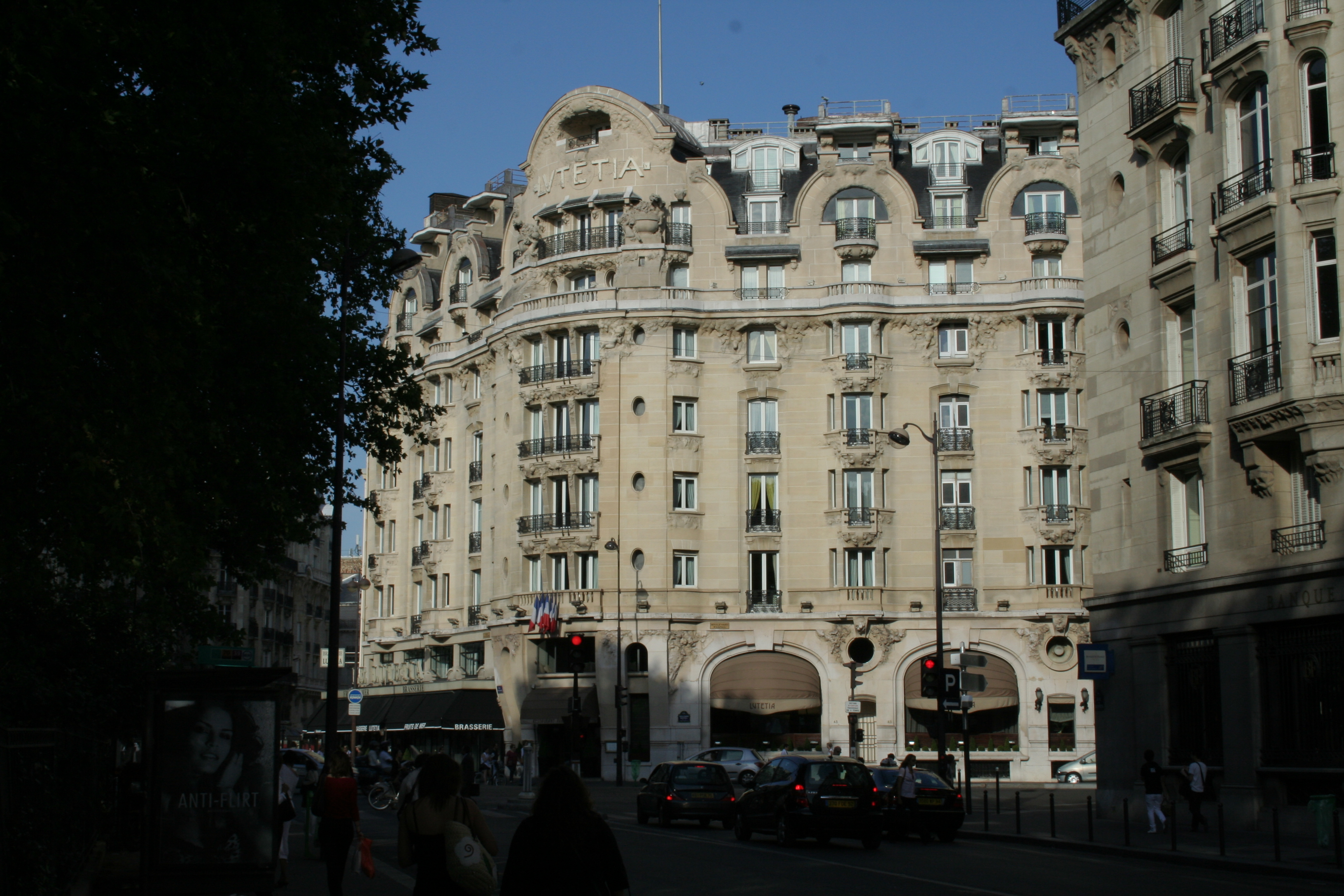
Hôtel Lutetia

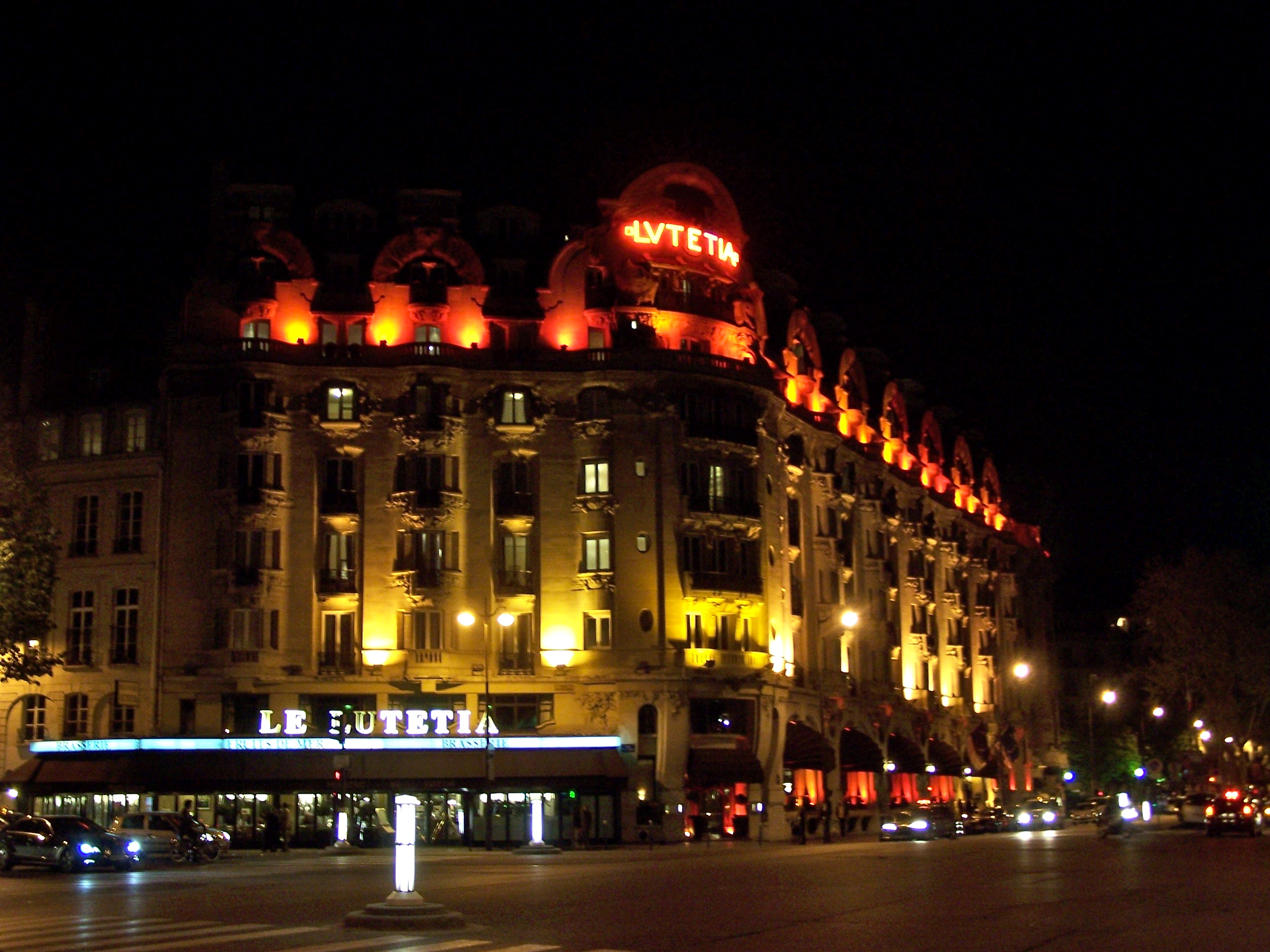
Hôtel Lutetia at night

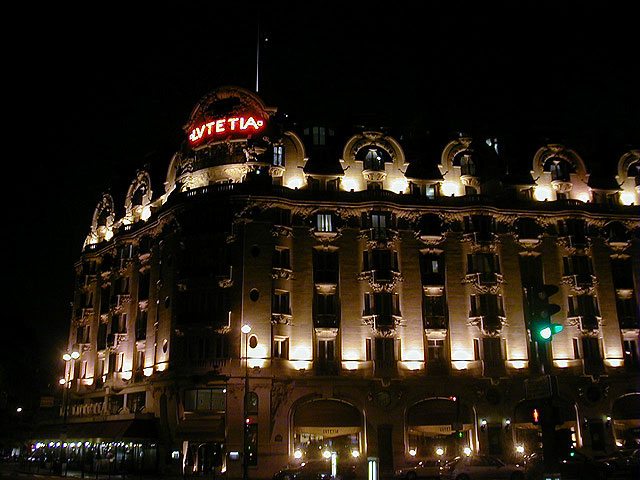
Hôtel Lutetia at night

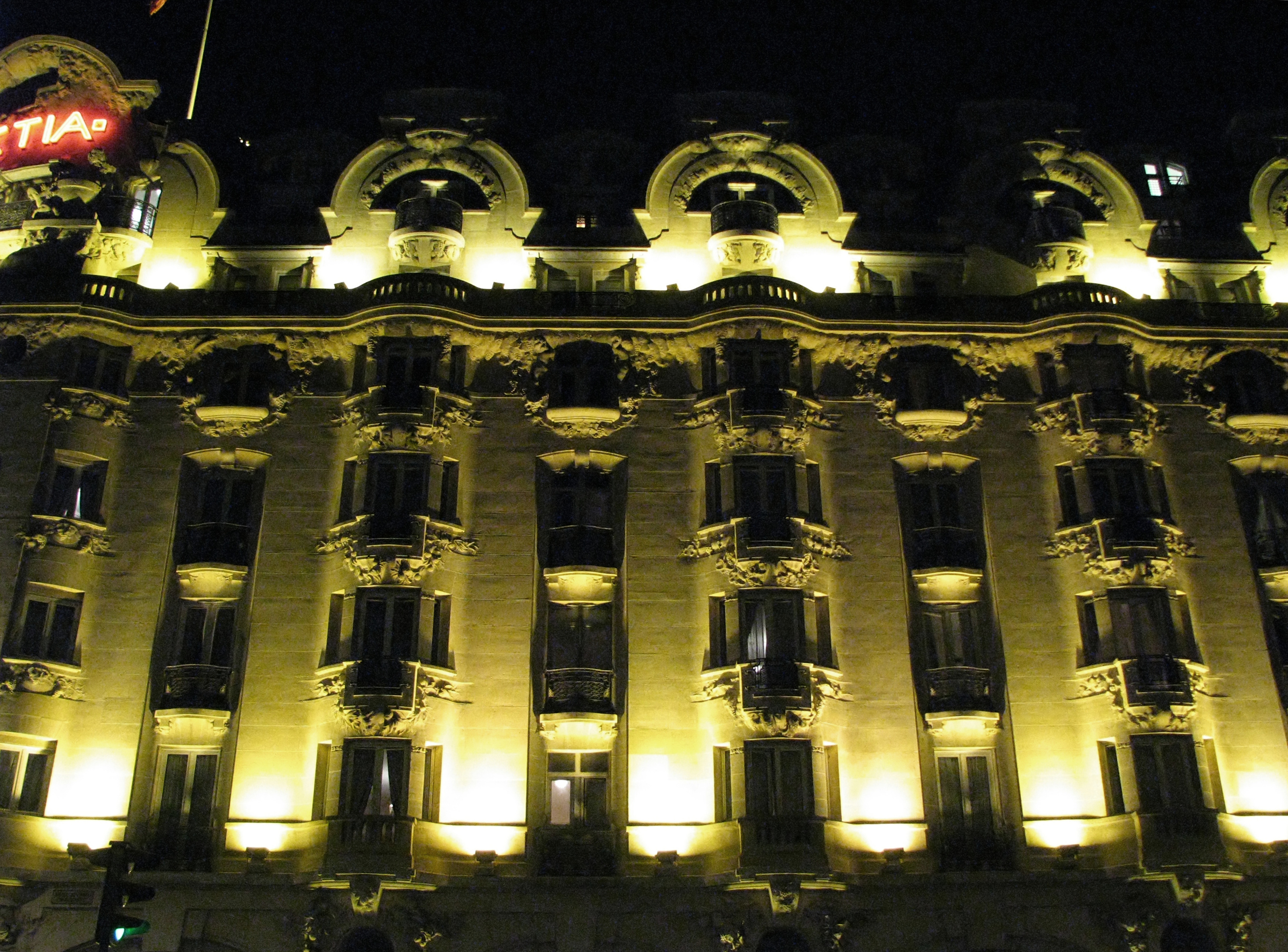
Hôtel Lutetia at night

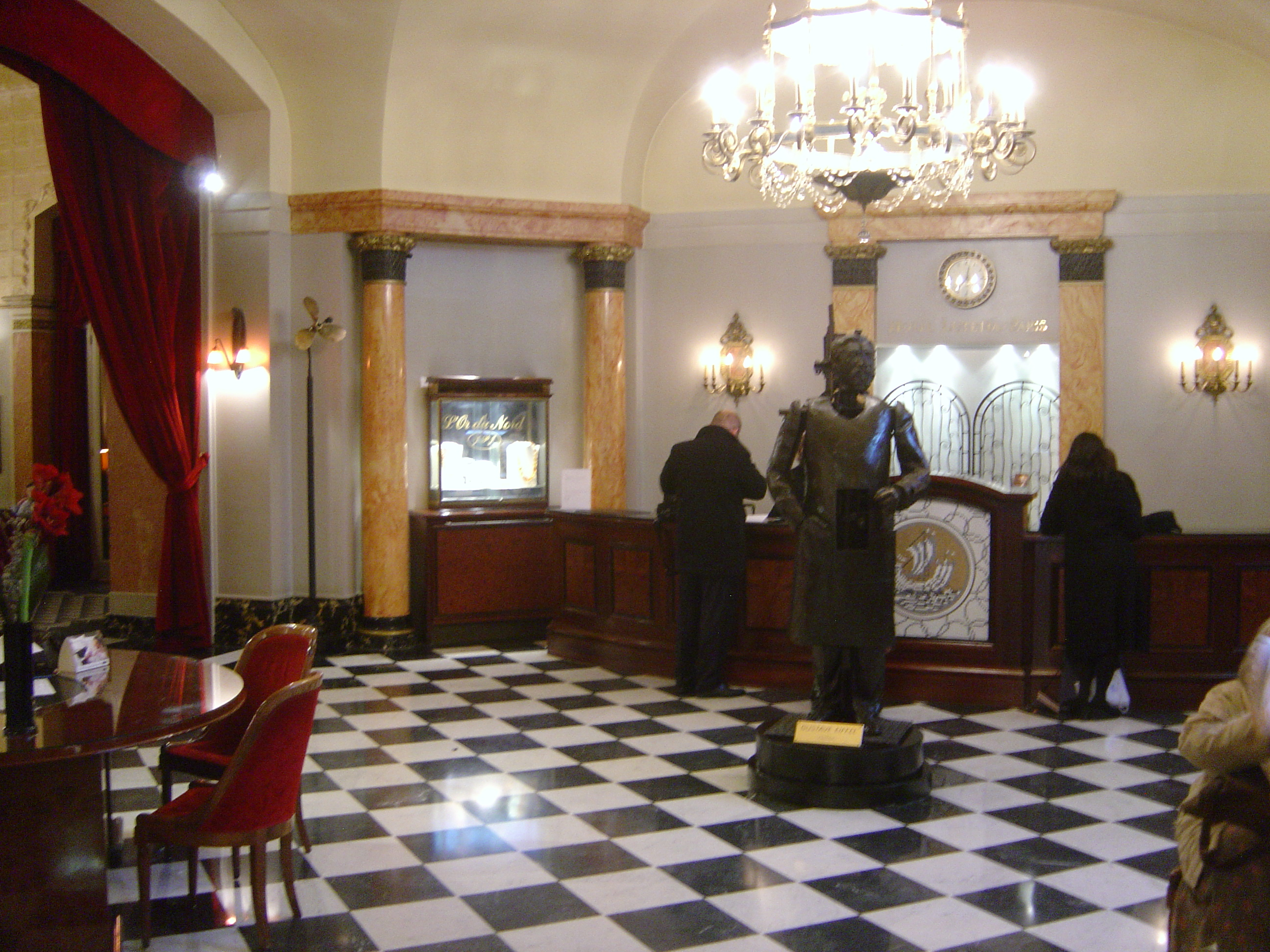
Hôtel Lutetia lobby

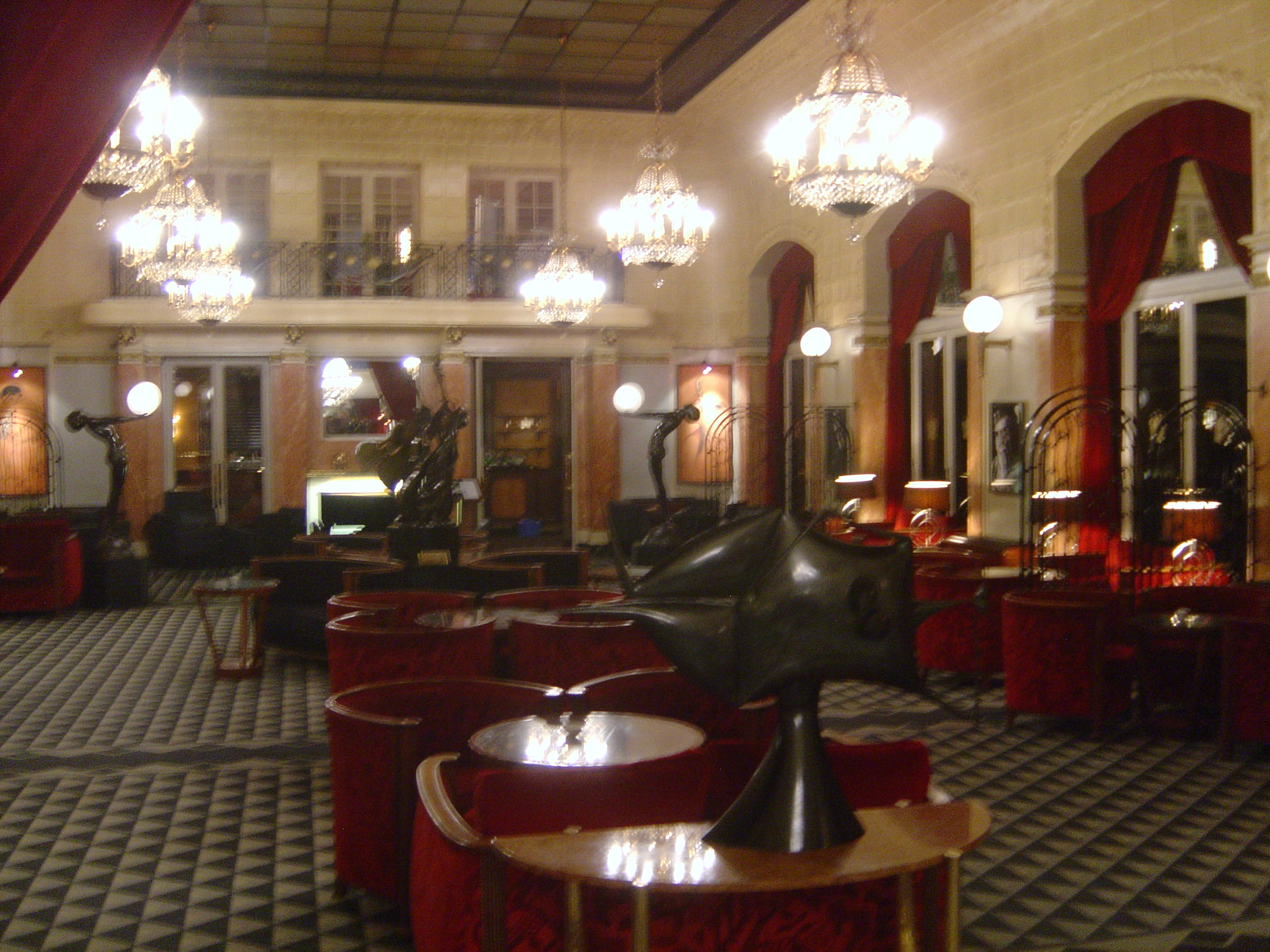
Hôtel Lutetia lounge

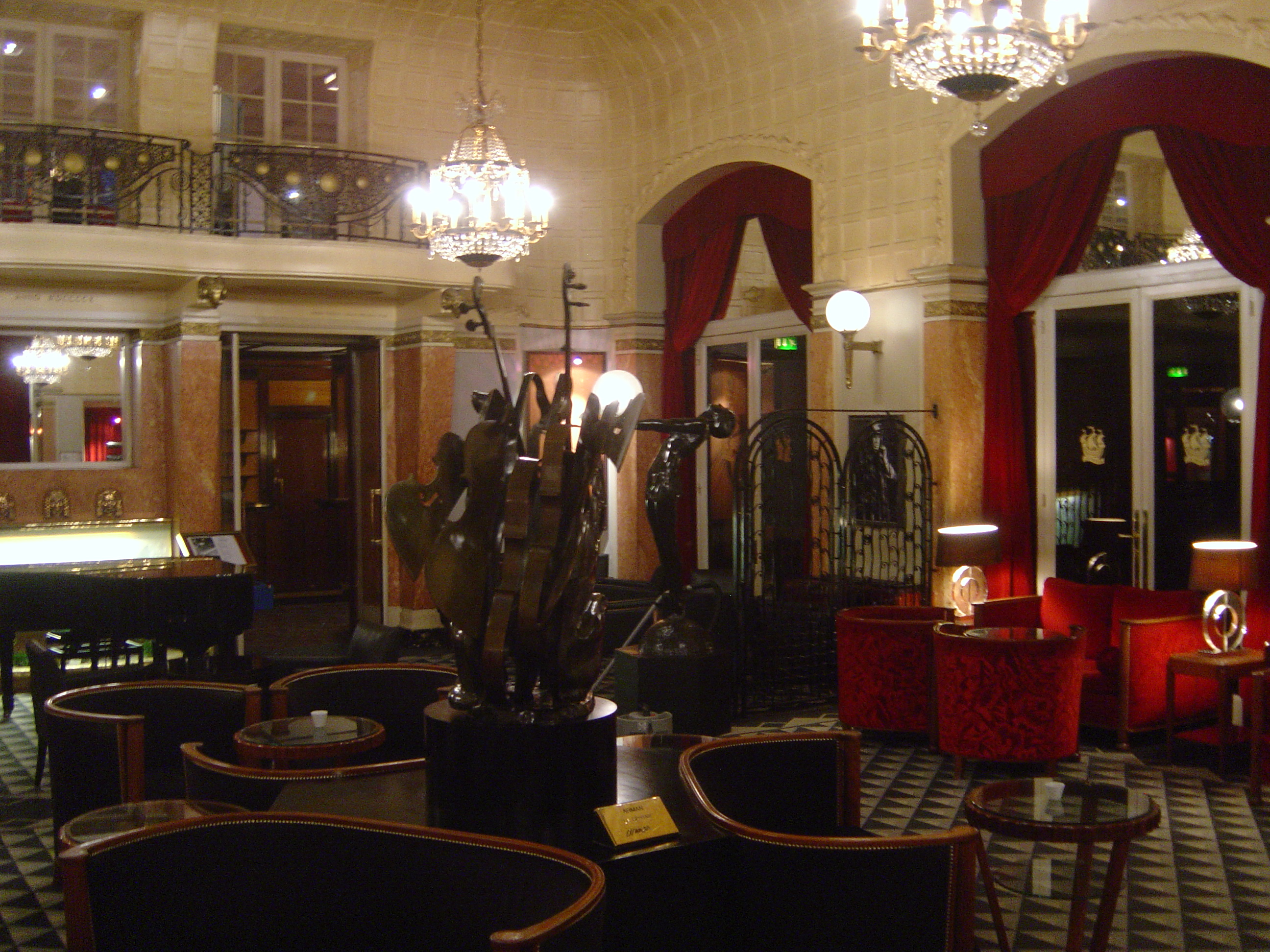
Hôtel Lutetia lounge

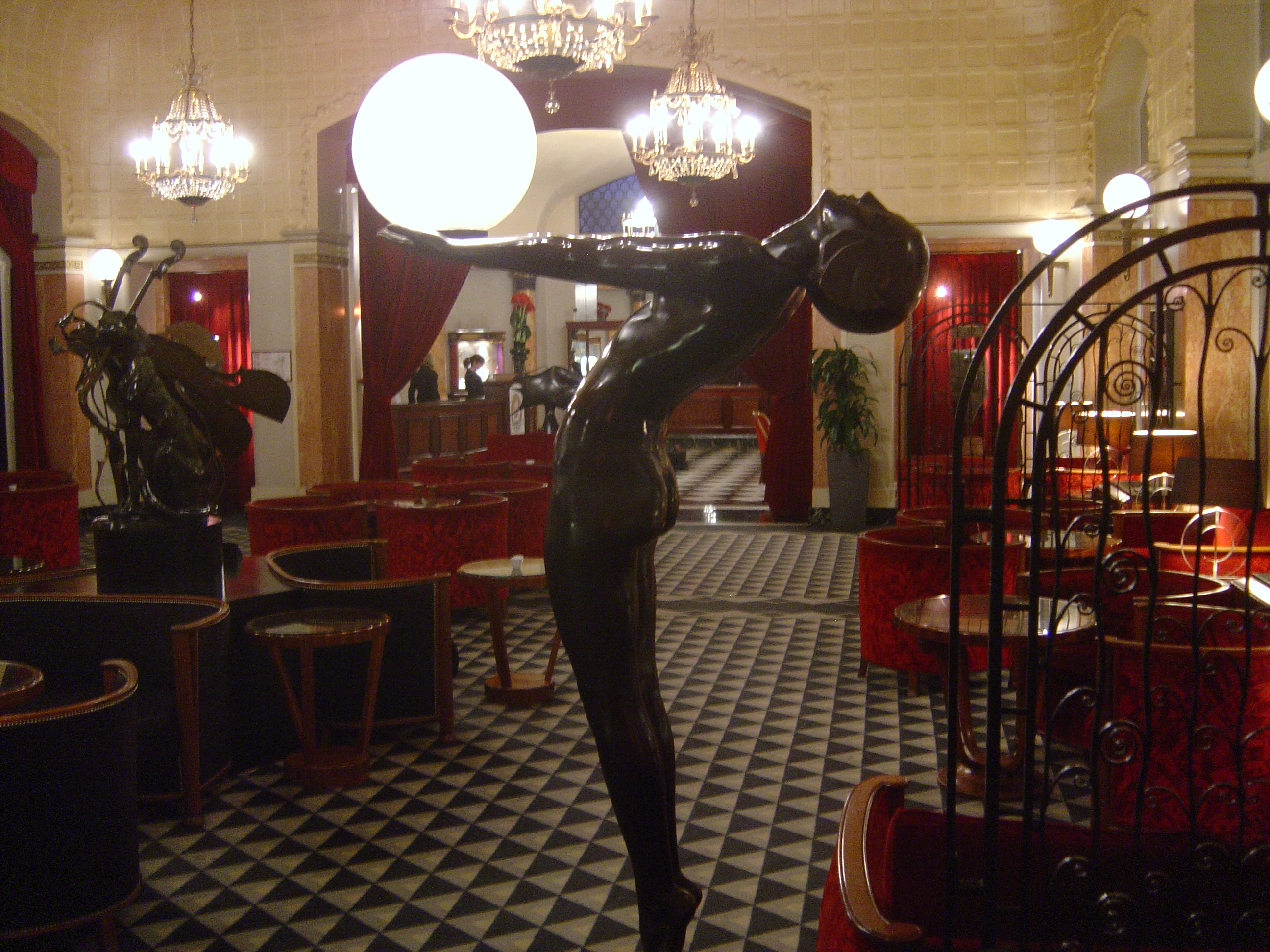
Hôtel Lutetia lounge

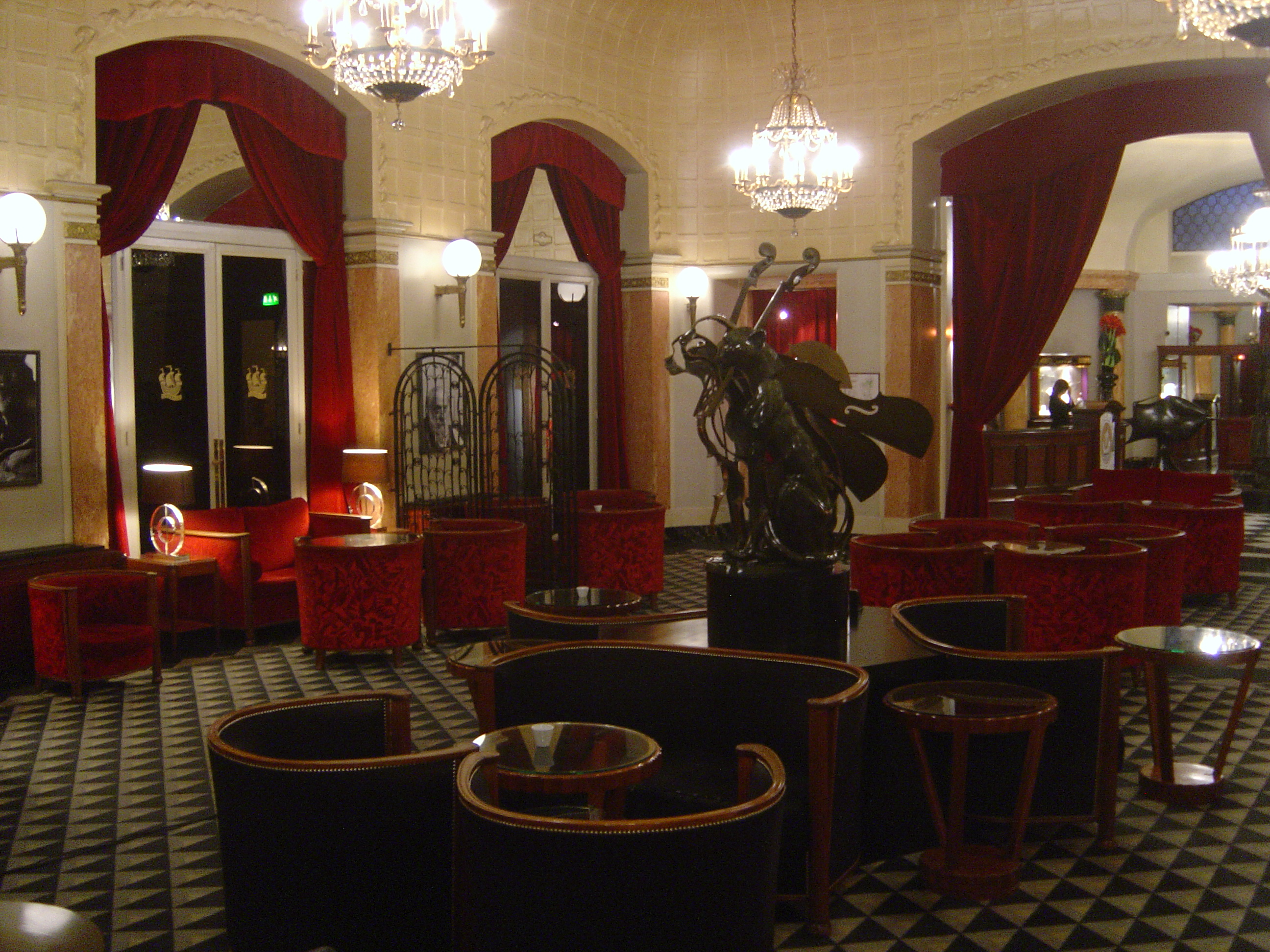
Hôtel Lutetia lounge

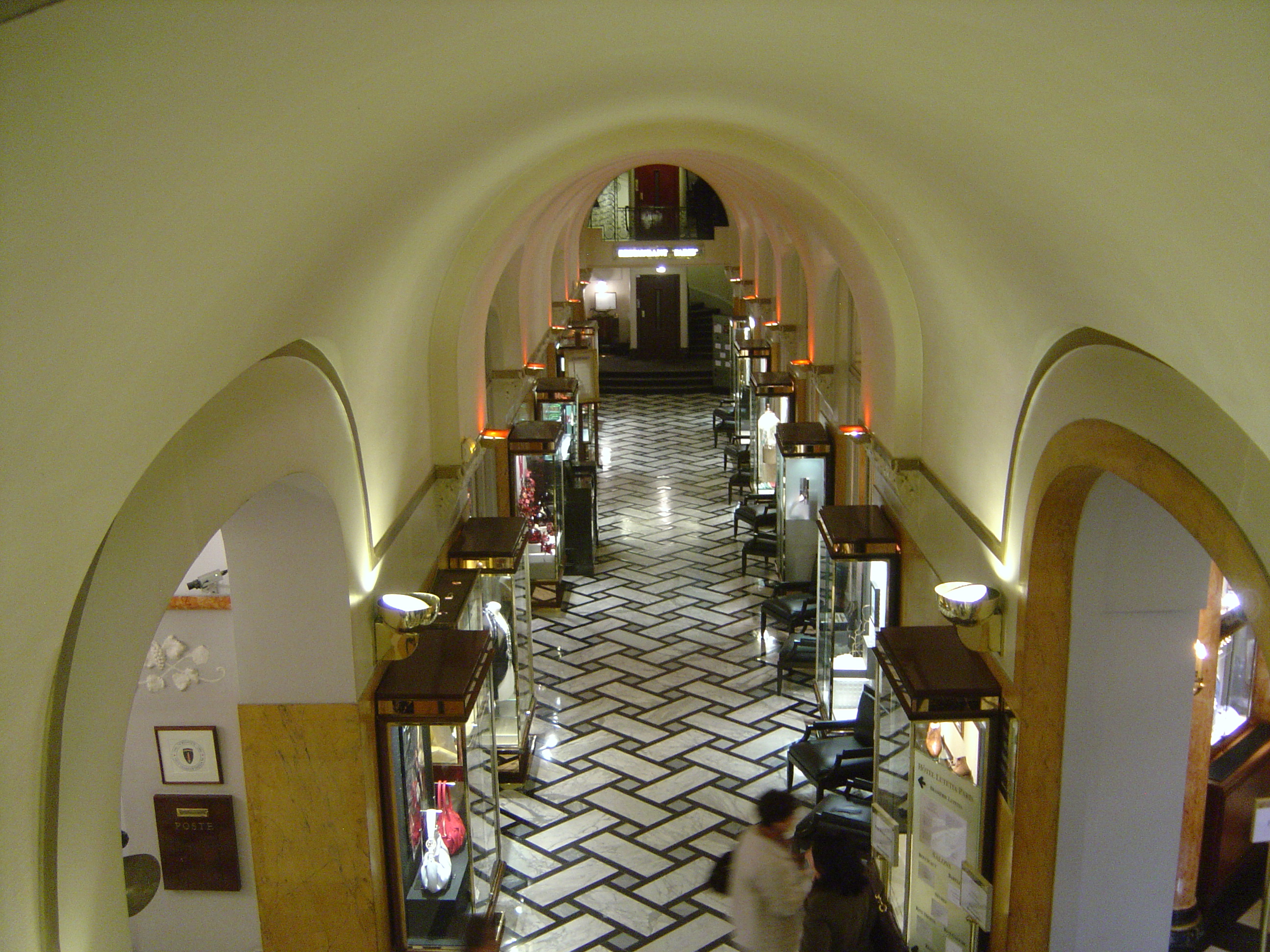
Hôtel Lutetia interior

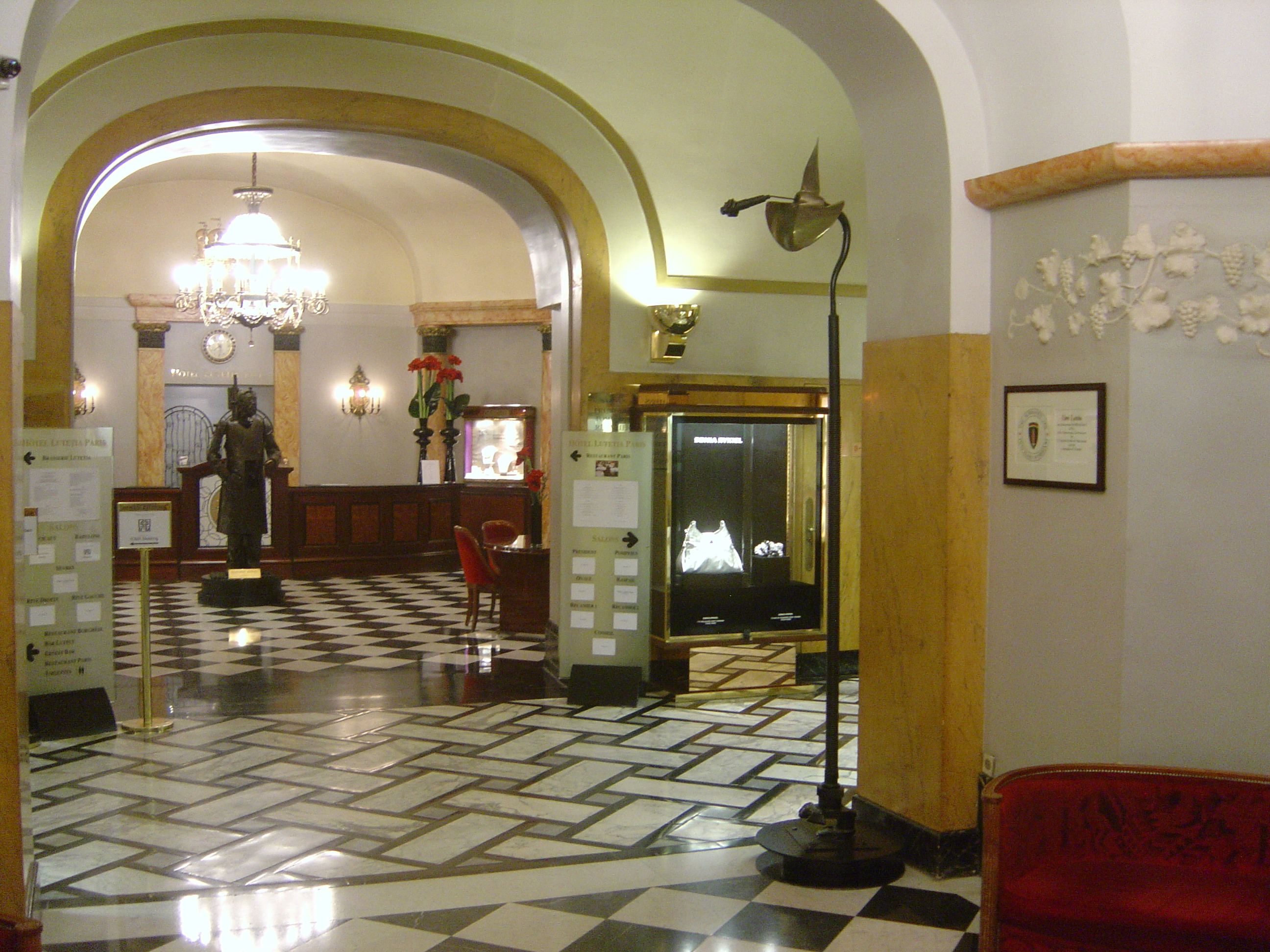
Hôtel Lutetia interior

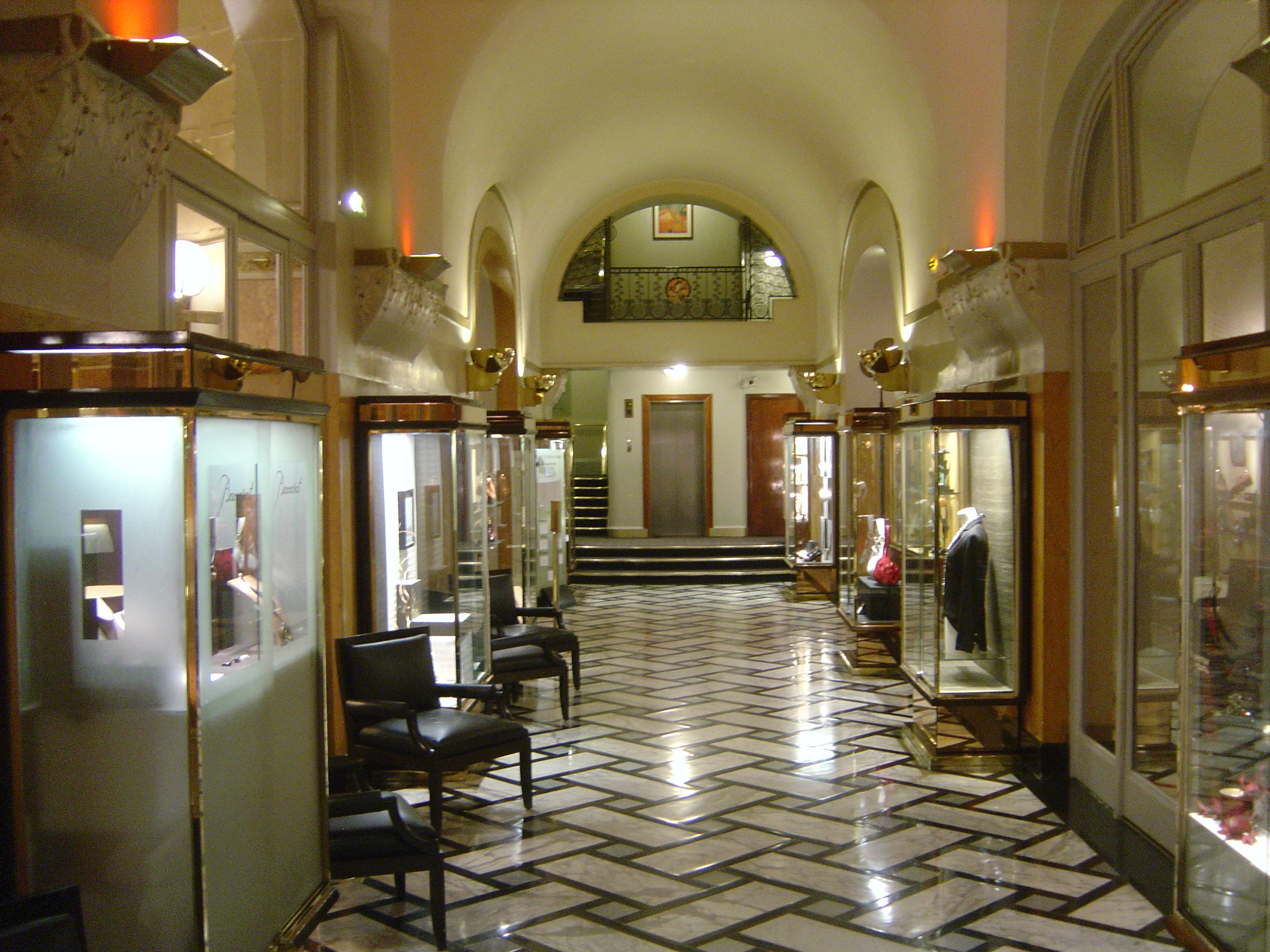
Hôtel Lutetia interior

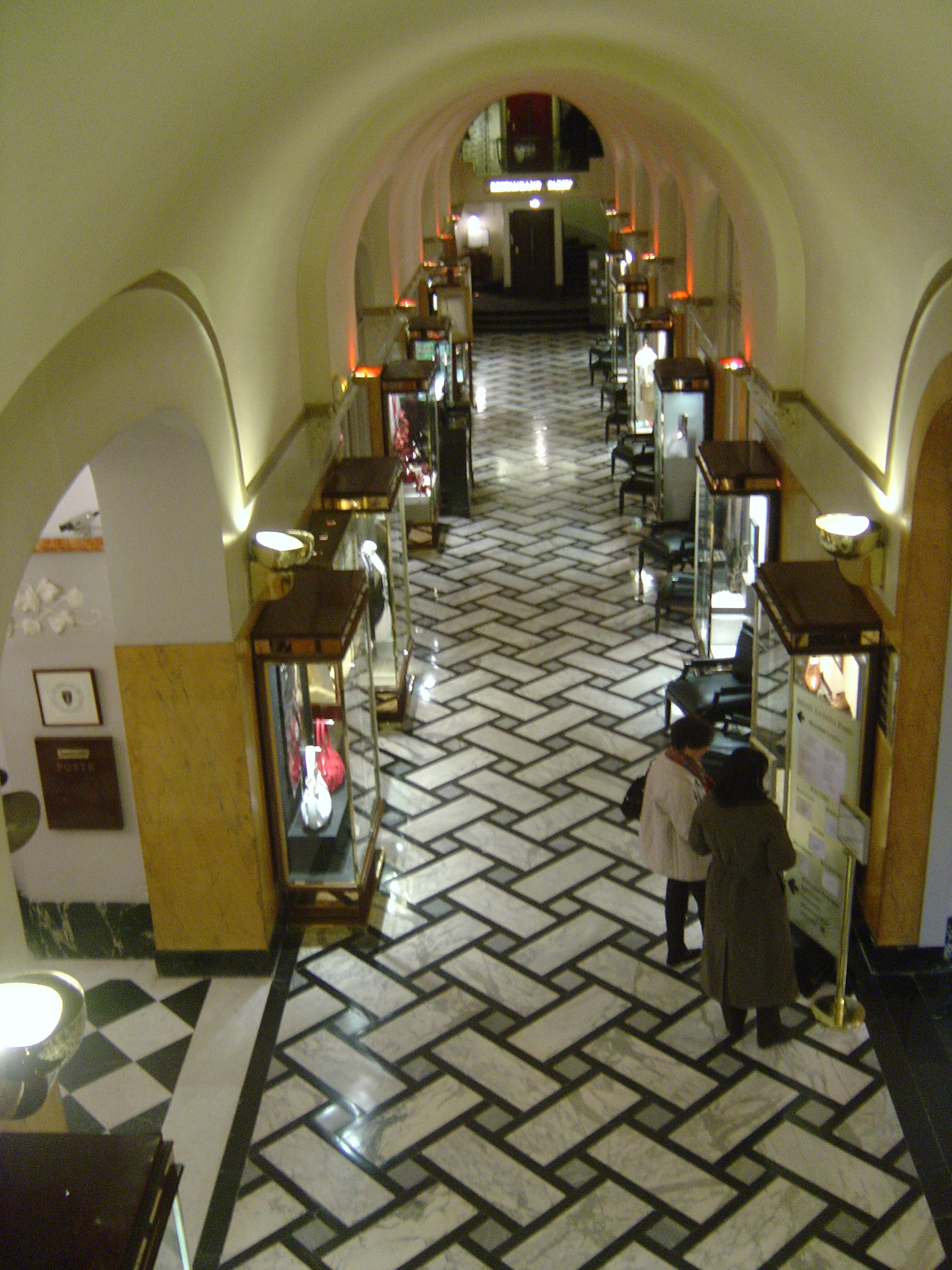
Hôtel Lutetia interior

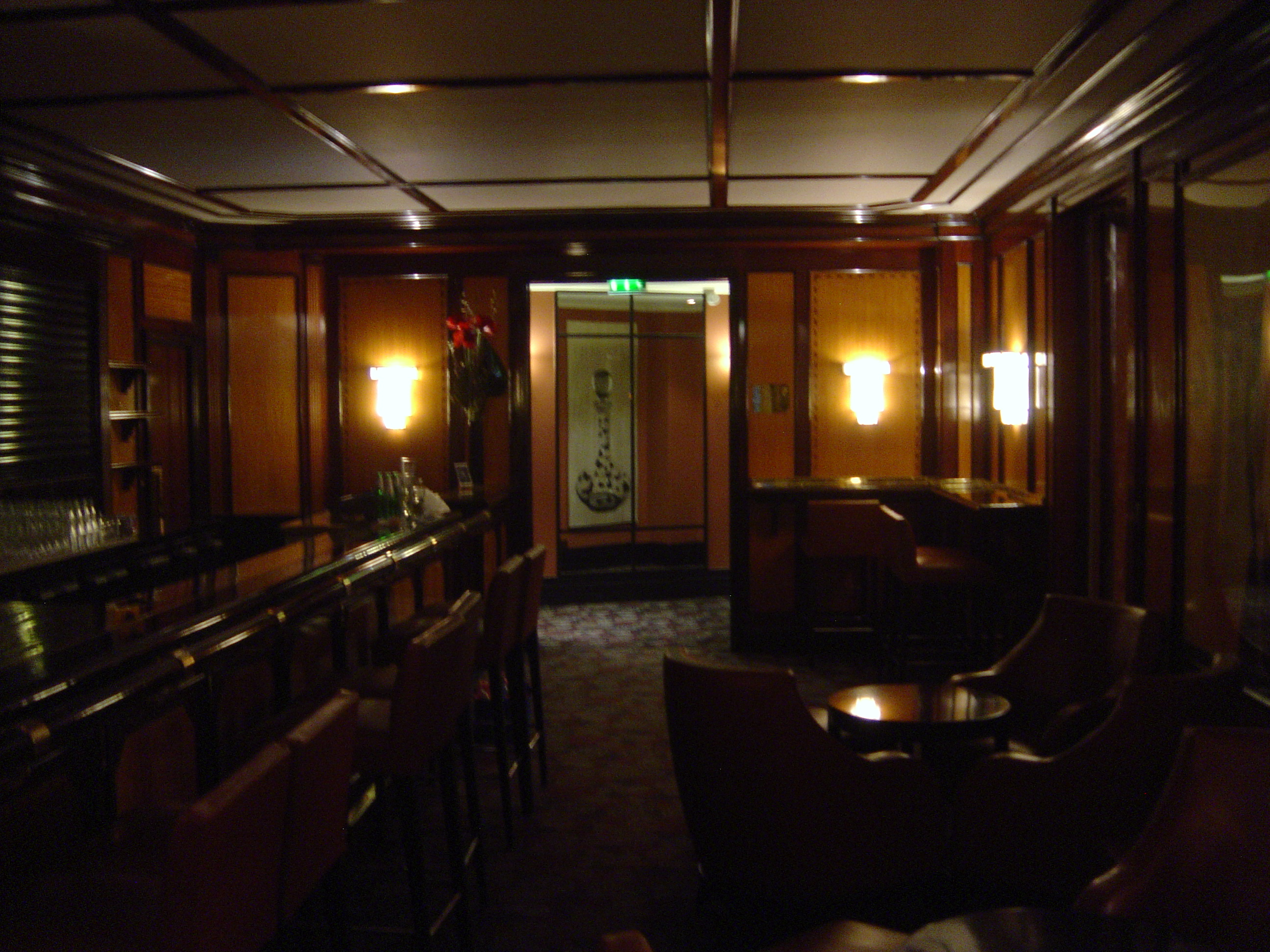
Hôtel Lutetia bar

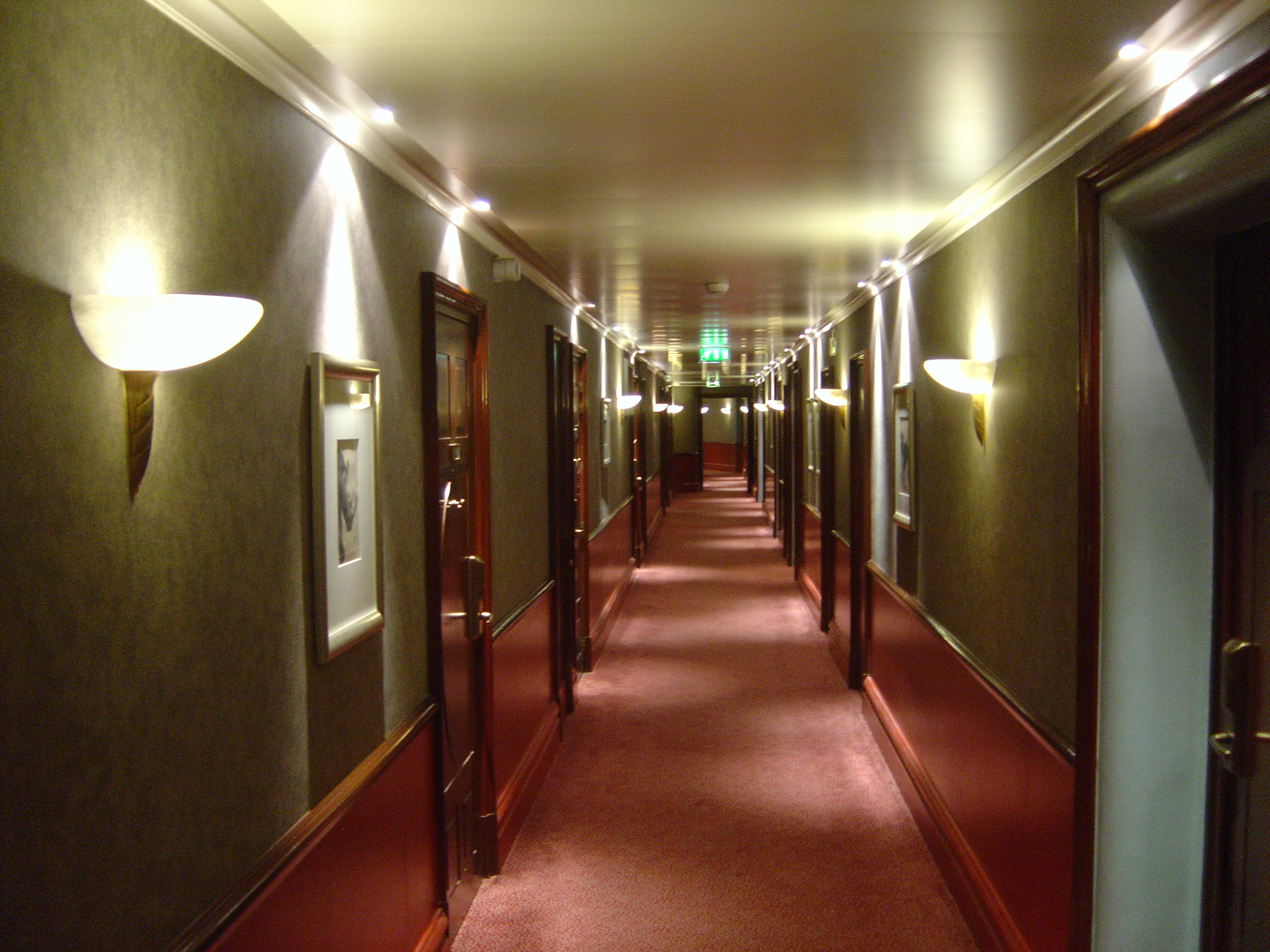
Hôtel Lutetia hallway
