= Landais (surname) =

Landais is a surname. Notable people with the surname include:

- Camille Landais (born 1981), French economist;
- Julien Landais (born 1981), French film director and actor;
- Pascal Landais (born 1979), French goalkeeper;
- Pierre Landais (1430–1485), Breton politician;
- Vincent Landais (born 1991), French rally co-driver.
