= Saint-Sulpice-des-Landes =

Saint-Sulpice-des-Landes may refer to two communes in France:

- Saint-Sulpice-des-Landes, Ille-et-Vilaine, in the Ille-et-Vilaine département
- Saint-Sulpice-des-Landes, Loire-Atlantique, in the Loire-Atlantique département
