= Paul Landes =

Israeli political appointee

Paul Landes (Hebrew: פול לנדס) is the founder and the last Head of the National Bureau for Counter Terror Financing (NBCTF) of the Ministry of Defense in Israel (2018-2025). Previously, he served as Head of the “Harpoon” Unit at the Mossad (2015–2017) and as Head of the Money Laundering and Terror Financing Prohibition Authority (IMPA) in the Ministry of Justice (2009–2015).

== Biography ==
Landes earned a Bachelor of Laws and Master of Laws with honors from the Hebrew University of Jerusalem. He served as a partner in the law firm Yehuda Raveh & Co., as the legal advisor of the Jerusalem Development Authority, and as the legal advisor at the “Derech Eretz Corporation,” which operates Highway 6. Landes serves as a lecturer on money laundering and terror financing prohibition at Reichman University and Bar-Ilan University.

In 2007, he was appointed as the legal adviser of the Money Laundering and Terror Financing Prohibition Authority (IMPA) in the Ministry of Justice. In November 2009, He was appointed as the acting director. In August 2010, the Israeli government appointed Landes as the director general. The IMPA was founded in 2002, based on the Prohibition on Money Laundering Law, 5760 (2000). It heads the struggle against money laundering and terror financing in Israel and aligns with worldwide parameters determined by the FATF. In 2012, Landes initiated a process for Israel to become a Financial Action Task Force member. In 2016, Israel was endowed with observer status, and in 2018, it became a full member. He was a member of two government committees: one, to limit the use of cash and second, for Financial Sanctions on Banking Corporations. He proposed an amendment to the money laundering prohibition law, which the Knesset accepted in 2014. Landes served as the Chairman of the Egmont Group of Financial Intelligence Units operative committee. He also served as an evaluator at Moneyval (in the Council of Europe), where he assessed compliance with regimes of anti-money laundering and combating the financing of terrorism.

From 2015 to 2017, Landes was Head of the "Harpoon" Unit at the Mossad, in charge of terror financing information gathering. He proposed it would perform better as an official unit, cooperating internationally with similar anti-terror and money-laundering organs. Yossi Cohen, Head of the Mossad, advocated for Avigdor Lieberman, Ministry of Defense, to relocate Harpoon to his office. The Security Cabinet of Israel moved Harpoon's jurisdiction to the Ministry of Defence.

The National Bureau for Counter-Terror Financing (NBCTF) at the Ministry of Defense was founded in March 2018 to coordinate national operations to topple the monetary framework for terrorism. Its authority is delineated in the Counter-Terrorism Law, 5776 (2016). The Minister of Defense appoints the director of the NBCTF in discussions with the Prime Minister and reports directly to the Minister. NBCTF submits a yearly report Under the Deduction Law 2018, This gives an account of the disbursements to Palestinians imprisoned in Israeli jails under the Palestinian Authority Martyrs Fund. Since its establishment in 2018 until December 2023, the National Bureau for Counter-Terror Financing of Israel seized over $1 billion in terror funding. In 2023, it issued 363 orders involving freezing assets and seizing funds in NIS 642.91 million. The NBCTF froze hundreds of Tron wallets, and cryptocurrency accounts on the Binance exchange site linked to Hamas, the Palestinian Islamic Jihad, and Iran's Quds Force. As of early 2024, such operations had frozen 3.7 billion shekels of terrorist-linked assets. In August 2024, Israel imposed sanctions on 18 oil tankers that Iran's Quds Force allegedly used to finance Hezbollah and Hamas terrorist groups. In 2024, it froze assets and seized funds in NIS 470 million. In March 2022, the NBCTF signed a MoU with the USA Department of Homeland Security to combat terrorist financing and collaborate in cybersecurity. In may 2025 he completed his tenure as head of the NBCTF.

He is a member of the board of directors of Israel Electric Corporation.

He is married to Assistant Commissioner Shlomit Landes, head of the Investigations Division in the Israel Police.
