= Alfred Akirov =

Israeli businessman

- אלפרד אקירוב
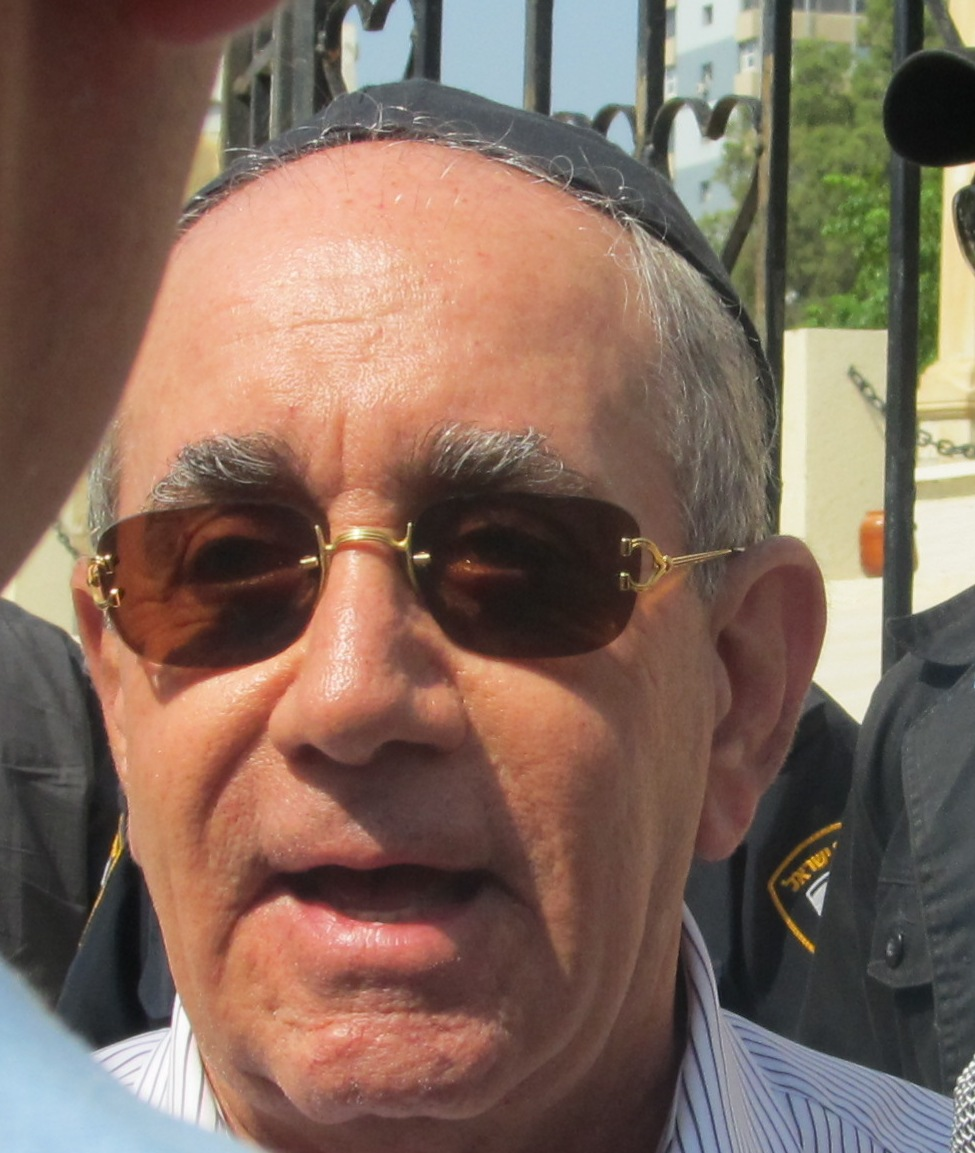
- Alfred Akirov
- Born: January 5, 1941 (age 85); Iraq
- Occupation: Businessman

Alfred Akirov (Hebrew: אלפרד אקירוב; born 5 January 1941), is an Israeli businessman. He is the founder of the Alrov Group. He appears on Forbes' World's Billionaires List in March 2026, with an estimated net worth of $1.6 billion.

== Biography ==
Alfred Akirov was born in Iraq to a Jewish family. He immigrated to Israel with his family in 1953.

== Business career ==
Akirov founded the Alrov Group in 1978 and he is currently its CEO. It has been listed on the Tel Aviv Stock Exchange since 1983. He helped rebuild Mamilla.

== Public service ==
Akirov served as the President of the French-Israeli Chamber of Commerce from 2010 to 2012. He became a Knight of the French Legion of Honour in 2013.

Akirov serves on the Board of Governors of Tel Aviv University.

== Personal life ==
Akirov is married to Hava Akirov, an executive at Alrov Group, and they have three children.
