= List of French billionaires by net worth =

The following list of billionaires in France is based on an annual assessment of wealth and assets compiled and published by Forbes magazine in 2023, according to Forbes' list of billionaires.

== 2023 Forbes list ==
Ranking in France	Name	Age	Net worth (USD)	Sources of wealth
1	Bernard Arnault & family	74	200.8 billion	LVMH
2	Françoise Bettencourt Meyers	70	80.5 billion	L'Oréal
3	François Pinault	86	40.1 billion	Kering
4	Alain Wertheimer	74	31.6 billion	Chanel
5	Gérard Wertheimer	72	31.6 billion	Chanel
6	Emmanuel Besnier	53	27.6 billion	Lactalis
7	Nicolas Puech	80	9.8 billion	Hermès
8	Jacques Saadé, jr.	51	9.8 billion	CMA CGM
9	Rodolphe Saadé	53	9.8 billion	CMA CGM
10	Tanya Saadé Zeenny	55	9.8 billion	CMA CGM
11	Vincent Bolloré	71	9.9 billion	Groupe Bolloré
12	Carrie Perrodo	72	8.8 billion	Perenco
13	Laurent Dassault	69	8.1 billion	Dassault Group
13	Thierry Dassault	66	8.1 billion	Dassault Group
13	Marie-Hélène Habert-Dassault	58	8.1 billion	Dassault Group
16	Jean-Michel Besnier	55	7.7 billion	Lactalis
16	Marie Besnier Beauvalot	42	7.7 billion	Lactalis
18	Xavier Niel	55	6.7 billion	Iliad SA
19	Alain Mérieux	85	6.3 billion	Institut Merieux
20	Michel Leclercq	83	5 billion	Decathlon Group
21	Stéphane Bancel	50	4.4 billion	Moderna
22	Patrick Drahi	59	4.3 billion	Altice
23	Marc Ladreit de Lacharrière	82	4.2 billion	FIMALAC
24	Danielle Bellon	83	4.1 billion	Sodexo
25	Mohed Altrad	75	3.3 billion	Scaffolding, cement mixers
26	Charles Edelstenne	85	3.1 billion	Dassault Systèmes
27	Jean Pierre Cayard	80	3 billion	La Martiniquaise
27	Gilles Martin	59	3 billion	Eurofins Scientific
29	Anne Beaufour	59	2.7 billion	Ipsen
29	Henri Beaufour	57	2.7 billion	Ipsen
31	Louis Le Duff	76	2.6 billion	Brioche Dorée and Groupe Le Duff
32	Bernard Fraisse	66	2.4 billion	Fareva
33	Martin Bouygues	71	2.1 billion	Bouygues
33	Olivier Bouygues	72	2.1 billion	Bouygues
33	Christian Latouche	82	2.1 billion	Fiducial SA
36	Olivier Pomel	46	1.8 billion	Datadog
37	François Feuillet	74	1.7 billion	Trigano
37	Alain Taravella	75	1.7 billion	Altarea SCA
39	Norbert Dentressangle	68	1.6 billion	Norbert Dentressangle
40	Philippe Ginestet	69	1.5 billion	GiFi
41	Laurent Junique	57	1.3 billion	TDCX
41	Yves-Loic Martin	57	1.3 billion	Eurofins Scientific
43	Édouard Carmignac	75	1 billion	Carmignac

== See also ==
- List of French people
- Lists of people by nationality
- Forbes list of billionaires
- List of billionaires
