= Fraisse (surname) =

Fraisse is a French surname. Notable people with the surname include:

- Anne Fraïsse (born 1959), French latinist, academic, and university president
- Bernard Fraisse (born 1956), French billionaire
- David Fraisse (born 1968), French rugby league player
- Geneviève Fraisse (born 1948), French philosopher and historian
- Paul Fraisse (1911–1996), French psychologist
- Robert Fraisse (disambiguation), multiple people
- Roland Fraïssé (1920–2008), French logician
- Rémi Fraisse (1993–2014), French botanist
- Yves Fraisse (born 1943), French rower
