= Beaufour =

Beaufour is a surname. Notable people with the surname include:

- Anne Beaufour (born 1963), French billionaire heiress
- Henri Beaufour (1965–2025), French billionaire heir and businessman

== See also ==
- Beaufour-Druval, a commune in France
