= Sainte-Livrade-sur-Lot =

- Commune
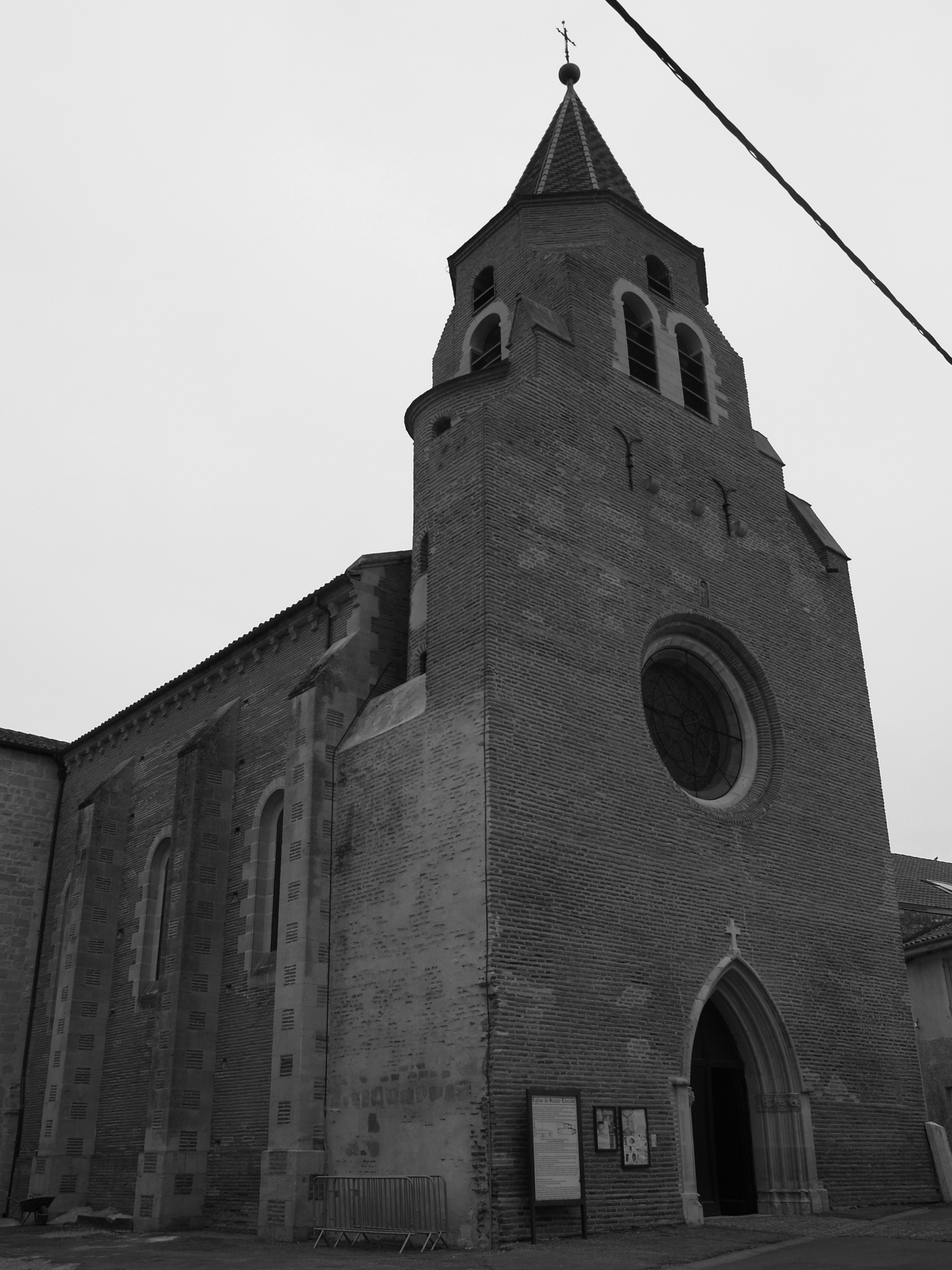
- The church in Sainte-Livrade

- Coat of arms
- Location of Sainte-Livrade-sur-Lot
- Location within France Location within Nouvelle-Aquitaine
- Coordinates: 44°23′56″N 0°35′25″E
- Country: France
- Region: Nouvelle-Aquitaine
- Department: Lot-et-Garonne
- Arrondissement: Villeneuve-sur-Lot
- Canton: Le Livradais
- Intercommunality: CA Grand Villeneuvois

Government
  - Mayor (2020–2026): Pierre-Jean Pudal
- Area^{1}: 30.94 km^{2} (11.95 sq mi)
- Elevation: 50 m (160 ft)
- Highest elevation: 194 m (636 ft)
- Lowest elevation: 37 m (121 ft)
- Population (2023): 6,541
  - Density: 211.4/km^{2} (547.5/sq mi)
- Time zone: UTC+01:00 (CET)
  - Summer (DST): UTC+02:00 (CEST)
- INSEE/Postal code: 47252 /47110
- ^{1} French Land Register data, which excludes lakes, ponds, glaciers > 1 km^{2} (0.386 sq mi or 247 acres) and river estuaries.

Sainte-Livrade-sur-Lot (French pronunciation: [sɛ̃t livʁad syʁ lɔt], literally Sainte-Livrade on Lot; Languedocien: Senta Liurada) is a commune in the Lot-et-Garonne department in south-western France.

== Geography ==
Sainte-Livrade-sur-Lot is located along the banks of the river Lot.

== History ==
Human inhabitation has been present around the area since the early Iron Age. The commune of Sainte-Livrade-sur-Lot itself was founded in 1289 as Sainte-Livrade d'Olt, Olt being the Occitan and former name of the Lot River. The current name was adopted in December 1919.

Despite its small size, Sainte-Livrade-sur-Lot is a multicultural town that has been host to numerous immigrant communities since the 20th century. The first prominent immigrant community to the town were Italians who escaped the fascist regime of Benito Mussolini during the 1920s and 1930s. They were soon followed by Spanish immigrants, also escaping fascism in their homeland under Francisco Franco.

Following the First Indochina War in 1954, in which Vietnam won its independence from France, Vietnamese troops who fought alongside the French were brought to metropolitan France as a recognition for their loyalty to the country and for fear that they would be persecuted by the new independent government. The troops, along with their families, were housed at camps designated as Centre d'accueil des Français d'Indochine, of which Sainte-Livrade-sur-Lot hosted the largest of three.

Later immigrant communities to the town included Pied-Noirs from the newly independent former French colony of Algeria following the Algerian War in 1962. Immigrants from the Maghreb, especially Algeria, also began arriving in the 1970s and 1980s.

== Demographics ==
Historical population
Year	Pop.	±% p.a.
1968	5,926	—
1975	5,787	−0.34%
1982	5,785	−0.00%
1990	5,938	+0.33%
1999	5,865	−0.14%
2007	6,142	+0.58%
2012	6,074	−0.22%
2017	6,459	+1.24%
2023	6,541	+0.21%
Source: INSEE

== Refugee camp ==
After France's defeat at the Battle of Dien Bien Phu and Vietnam's independence from France in 1954, roughly five thousand Vietnamese troops who fought for France, as well as their families and Vietnamese married to French colonists, were repatriated to the country. Their arrival led to the creation of refugee camps designated as Camps d'accueil des rapatriés d'Indochine (Center for the Reception of the French of Indochina), of which Sainte-Livrade-sur-Lot hosted the largest, containing nearly 1,500 people at its height. The camp was converted into barracks from a World War II munitions factory, in which residents lived in rudimentary conditions with a government sponsored hospital and school.

The population of the camp declined as children of the refugees moved away from the area after they grew up, due to limited education and employment opportunities. Today, residents largely consist of surviving refugees and some families descended from the migrants. As the war in Indochina was unpopular, the French government did not do much to improve the lives of the community's people until recently, when plans were underway to convert the barrack-like homes of the camp to social housing. Nevertheless, Sainte-Livrade-sur-Lot hosts grocery stores and a Buddhist temple that serve the Vietnamese community.

== Notable people ==
- Philippe Ginestet (born 1954), French billionaire businessman, founder of GiFi

== See also ==
- Communes of the Lot-et-Garonne department
