= Carlton House Terrace =

Street in City of Westminster, United Kingdom

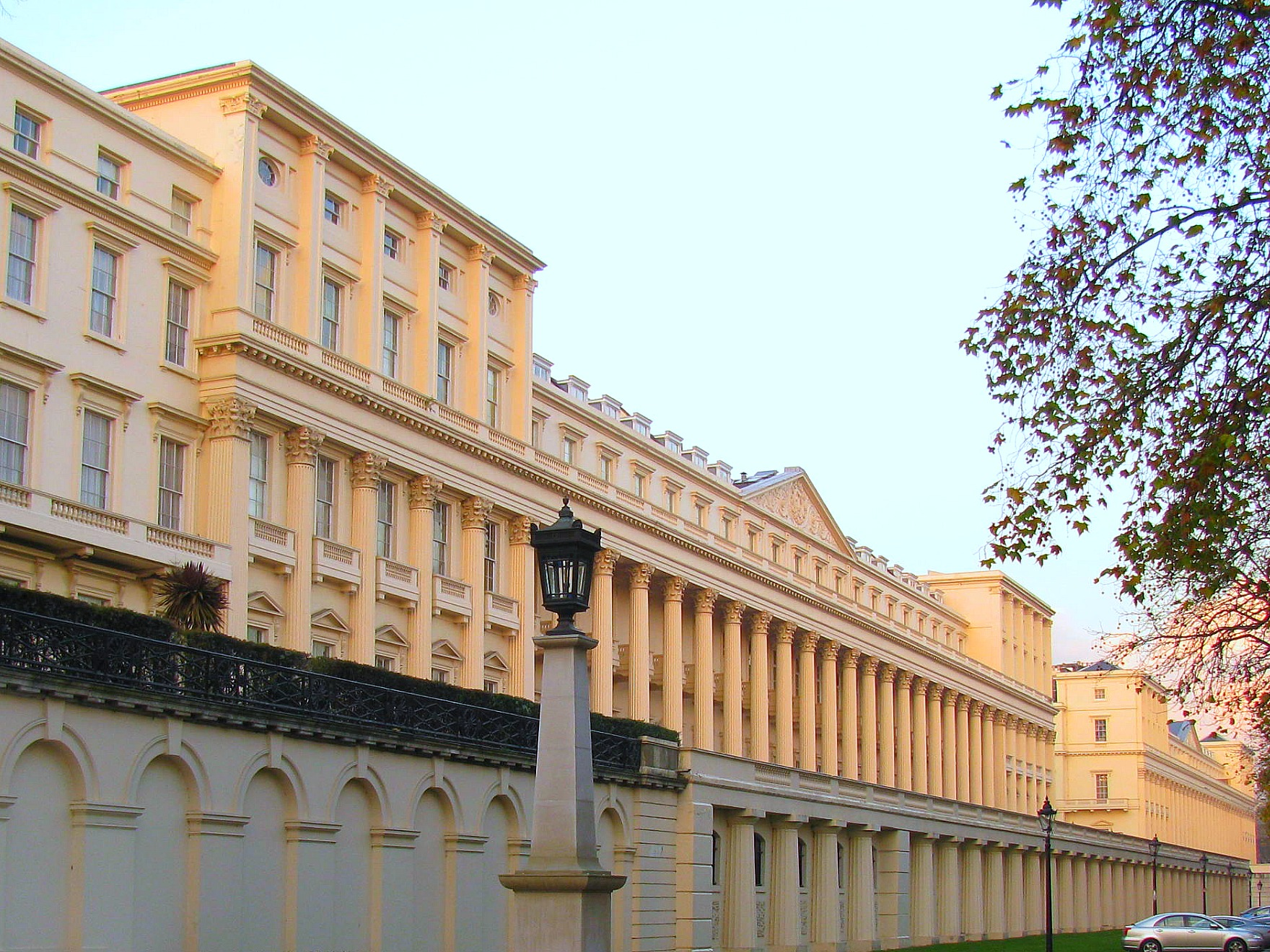
- Nos. 1–9 Carlton House Terrace, facing St James's Park

- Location within Central London
- 51.5058°N 0.1327°W
- Location: Whitehall, London
- OS grid reference: TQ296801

History
- Built: 1827–29

Site notes
- Architect(s): John Nash with James Pennethorne, Decimus Burton and others
- Architectural style: Neoclassical
- Owner: Crown Estate

Listed Building – Grade I
- Official name: Numbers 1–9 including railings to north and east
- Designated: 9 January 1970
- Reference no.: 1209780

Listed Building – Grade I
- Official name: Numbers 10 to 18 (including the Institute of Contemporary Arts) and railings to north and west
- Designated: 9 January 1970
- Reference no.: 1209794

Listed Building – Grade II*
- Official name: 1, Carlton Gardens, London, SW1
- Designated: 9 January 1970
- Reference no.: 1357247

Listed Building – Grade II*
- Official name: 2, Carlton Gardens, London, SW1
- Designated: 9 January 1970
- Reference no.: 1209730

Listed Building – Grade II*
- Official name: 3, Carlton Gardens, London, SW1
- Designated: 9 January 1970
- Reference no.: 1066349

Carlton House Terrace is a street in the St James's district of the City of Westminster in London. Its principal architectural feature is a pair of terraces, the Western and Eastern terraces, of white stucco-faced houses on the south side of the street, which overlook The Mall and St. James's Park. These terraces were built on Crown land between 1827 and 1832 to overall designs by John Nash, but with detailed input by other architects including Decimus Burton. Construction was overseen by James Pennethorne. Both terrace blocks are Grade I listed buildings. Carlton Gardens is at the terrace's western end.

In the early 18th century, a townhouse built on the site was rented by Baron Carleton. A century later, Carlton House, also known as Carlton Palace, was enlarged and occupied by the Prince Regent. After falling out of favour with George IV, who began enlargeing Buckingham Palace on his accession in 1820, the house was pulled down and the Crown replaced the demolished palace with the current terraces. They are divided by the Duke of York's Steps which lead down to The Mall. A smaller flight of steps leads down from Carlton Gardens; these steps are the site of the King George VI and Queen Elizabeth Memorial.

Residents have included the prime ministers, Lords Palmerston and Grey, William Gladstone, who lived in houses in both the terrace and the gardens, and Arthur Balfour; other senior politicians such as Lord Curzon; and soldiers including Lords Cardigan and Kitchener. In the mid-20th century, Number 9 served as the German Embassy while Number 4 Carlton Gardens housed the offices of Charles de Gaulle's Free French forces. The terrace houses the headquarters of the British Academy, the Royal Society, the Royal Academy of Engineering, the Institute of Contemporary Arts and the Federation of British Artists. Numbers 13–16 housed the headquarters of the Crown Estate in the 20th century, which continues to own the freehold of the terrace.

== History ==
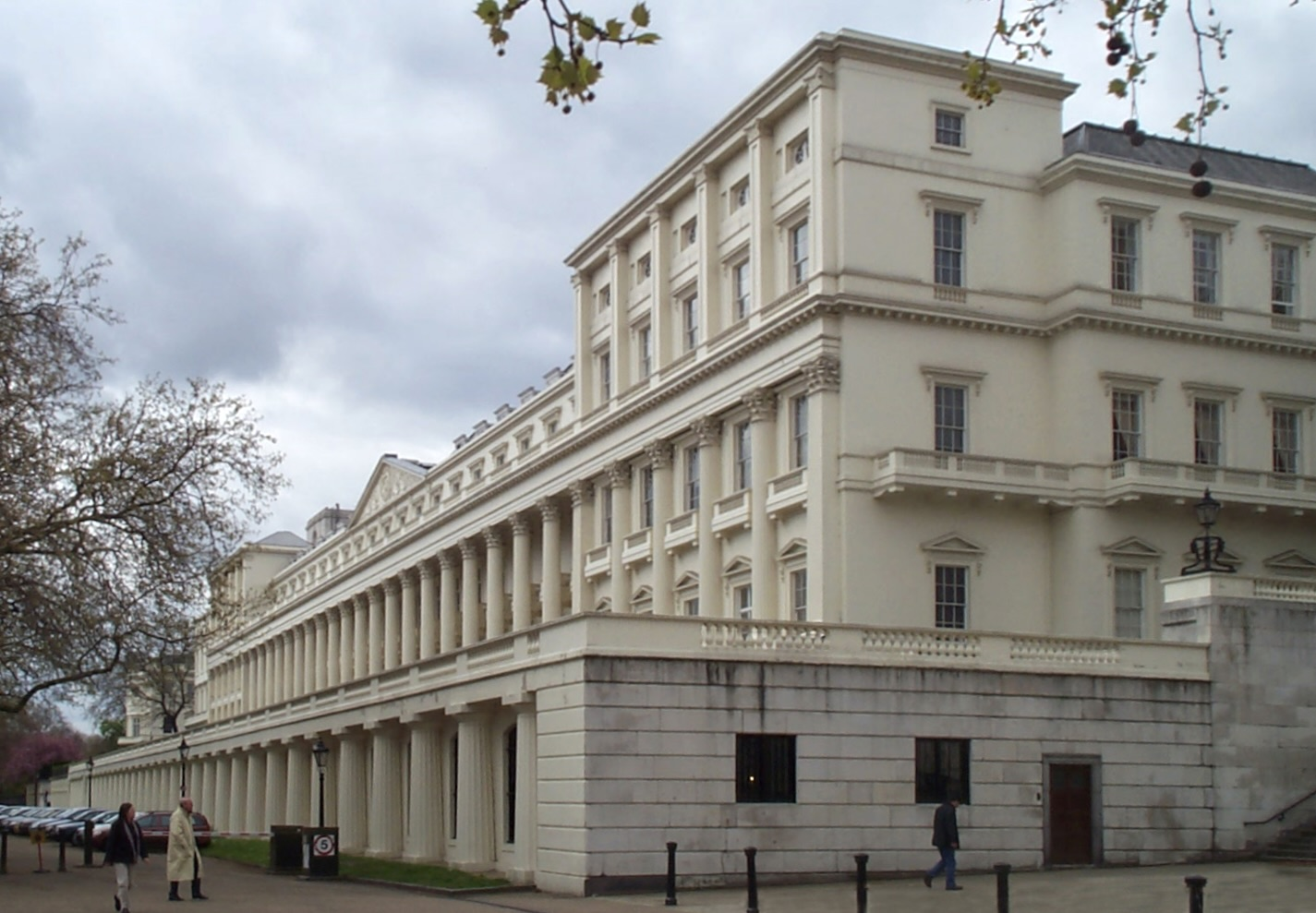
Carlton House Terrace, seen from The Mall

=== Background ===
The land on which Carlton House Terrace was built had once been part of the grounds of St James's Palace, known as "the Royal Garden" and "the Wilderness". The latter was at one time in the possession of Prince Rupert of the Rhine (cousin of Charles II) and was later called Upper Spring Garden. From 1700 the land was leased by Henry Boyle, who spent £2,835 on improving the existing house in the royal garden. Queen Anne issued letters patent granting Boyle a lease for a term of 31 years from 2 November 1709 at £35 per annum.

On Boyle's death the lease passed to his nephew, the architect and aesthete Lord Burlington, and in January 1731 George II issued letters patent granting Burlington a reversionary lease for a further term of 40 years at an annual rent of £35.

The property, by then called Carlton House, was granted by George III to his eldest son, George, Prince of Wales (later the Prince Regent) on his coming of age in 1783. The prince spent enormous sums improving and enlarging the property, running up huge debts. Despite expenditure of over £160,000 on the house, the diarist Joseph Farington recorded that it was "a thing of threads and patches" and was considered to be unsafe. The Prince Regent came to dislike the building and on his accession in 1820, he moved to Buckingham Palace.

Instructions were given in 1826 to the Commissioners of Woods and Forests that "Carlton Palace" should be given up to the public, be demolished and the site and gardens laid out as building ground for "dwelling houses of the First Class". By 1829 the Commissioners reported that the site was completely cleared and that part of it had already been let on building leases. Materials from the demolition were sold by public auction, with some fixtures transferred to Windsor Castle and to "The King's House, Pimlico". Columns of the portico were re-used in the design for the new National Gallery in Trafalgar Square, interior Ionic columns were moved to the conservatories of Buckingham Palace, and some of the armorial stained glass was incorporated in windows of Windsor Castle.

=== Construction ===
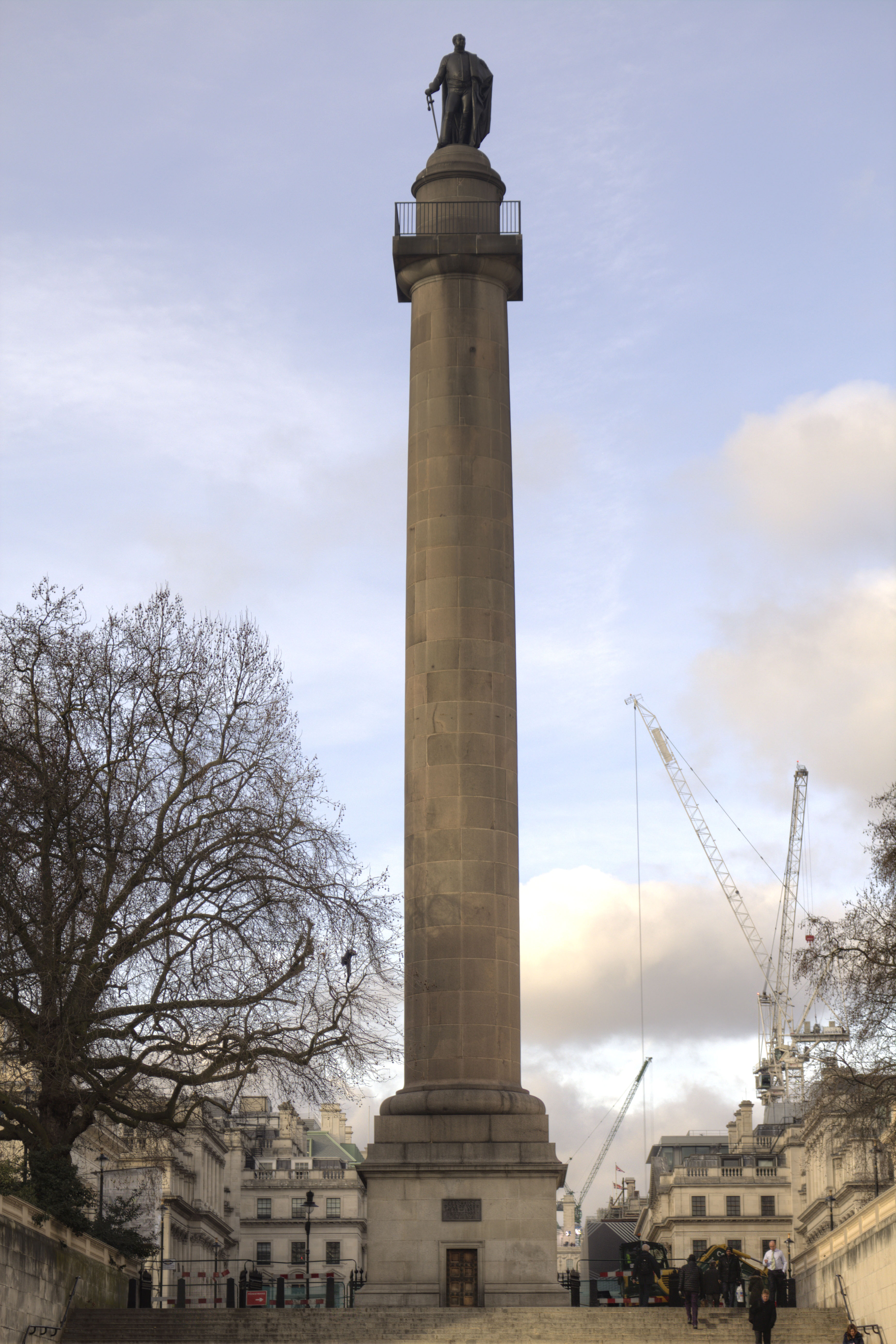
The Duke of York's Column, 1834, a monument to Prince Frederick, Duke of York and Albany

After Carlton House was demolished the development of its site was originally intended to be part of a scheme for improving St James's Park. For this John Nash proposed three terraces of houses along the north of the park, balanced by three along the south side, overlooking Birdcage Walk. None of the three southern terraces and only two of the three northern ones were built - the west (No.1–9) and east (No. 10–18) sections of Carlton House Terrace. (Note: Nash's plans included the demolition of Marlborough House to the west, replacing it with the third terrace; this idea was reflected in Christopher and John Greenwood's large scale London map of 1830, but this proposal was not implemented.) The terrace formed a southern end of Nash's Via Triumphalis. The two blocks which were built were designed by Nash and Decimus Burton, with James Pennethorne in charge of the construction. Decimus Burton exclusively designed No. 3 and No. 4. Carlton House Terrace. These townhouses took the place of Carlton House, and the freehold still belongs to the Crown Estate. Nash planned to connect the two blocks with a large domed fountain between them re-using the old columns of the Carlton House portico, but the idea was vetoed by the king; the present-day Duke of York's Steps took the place of the fountain. In 1834 the Duke of York's Column was erected at the top of the steps. It consists of a granite column designed by Benjamin Wyatt topped with a bronze statue by Richard Westmacott of Frederick, Duke of York.

The terraces, which are four storeys in height above a basement, were designed in a Neoclassical style, stucco clad, with a Corinthian columned façade overlooking St James's Park, surmounted by an elaborate frieze and pediment. At the south side, facing the park, the lower frontage has a series of squat Doric columns, supporting a substantial podium terrace at a level between the street entrances to the north and the ground floor level of the modern Mall. Simon Bradley and Nikolaus Pevsner wrote that they are perhaps "the greatest terrace houses ever built in Britain". The architectural historian John Summerson thought Nash's inspiration were Ange-Jacques Gabriel's buildings in the Place de la Concorde, Paris, although his praise was muted:

The central pediments are a somewhat too contrived means of preventing an apparent sag in a very long façade and the attics on the end pavilions may be over-emphatic. Subtlety of modelling there is none. In fact, Carlton House Terrace is thoroughly typical of the extraordinary old man who designed it, but whose only contribution to the work was probably the provision of a few small sketches, done either in the glorious painted gallery of his Regent Street mansion or the flower-scented luxury of his castle in the Isle of Wight.

The authors of the Survey of London took a more favourable view:

The houses … form a double group each side of the Duke of York's Column. Designed as an architectural entity, facing the Park, they represent with their range of detached Corinthian columns, a pleasing example of comprehensive street architecture; an effect greatly enhanced by the freshness of their façades … The end house to each block is carried up above the roof of the main façade, thereby effecting a successful pavilion treatment. The return fronts of the houses facing the steps are also effectively treated in a complementary manner.

Although Nash delegated the supervision of building to Pennethorne, he kept the letting of the sites firmly in his own hands. Ground rents, payable to the Crown, were set at the high rate of 4 guineas per foot frontage. Nash himself took leases of five sites – nos 11–15 intending to let them on the open market at a substantial profit. In the event he could not cover his total costs and made a small loss on the transactions.

=== Later history ===
In 1832 the Carlton Club, which had been formed by the Duke of Wellington and others shortly beforehand, took up residence at Number 2, courtesy of one of its supporters Lord Kensington. The club moved to Pall Mall in 1835.

In the 20th century the terrace came under threat of partial or complete demolition and redevelopment, as were many country houses at that time. By the 1930s there was little demand for large central London houses, and the Commissioners of Crown Lands were having difficulty in letting the properties. Two properties were let to clubs: Number 1 to the Savage Club and Number 16 to Crockford's gambling club, but residential tenants became hard to find. Proposals for redevelopment were put forward by the architect Sir Reginald Blomfield, who had earlier been one of those responsible for replacing Nash's Regent Street buildings with larger structures in the Edwardian neo-classical style. Blomfield proposed rebuilding "in a manner suitable for hotels, large company offices, flats and similar purposes". The suggested new buildings were to be two storeys higher than Nash's houses, and there was an outcry that persuaded the Commissioners not to proceed with the scheme.

The terrace was severely damaged by German bombing during the Second World War. In the 1950s the British government considered acquiring the terrace as the site for a new Foreign Office headquarters. The Nash façades were to be preserved, but it was widely felt that the height of the redevelopment behind them would be unacceptable and the plans were not taken forward.

=== West terrace ===
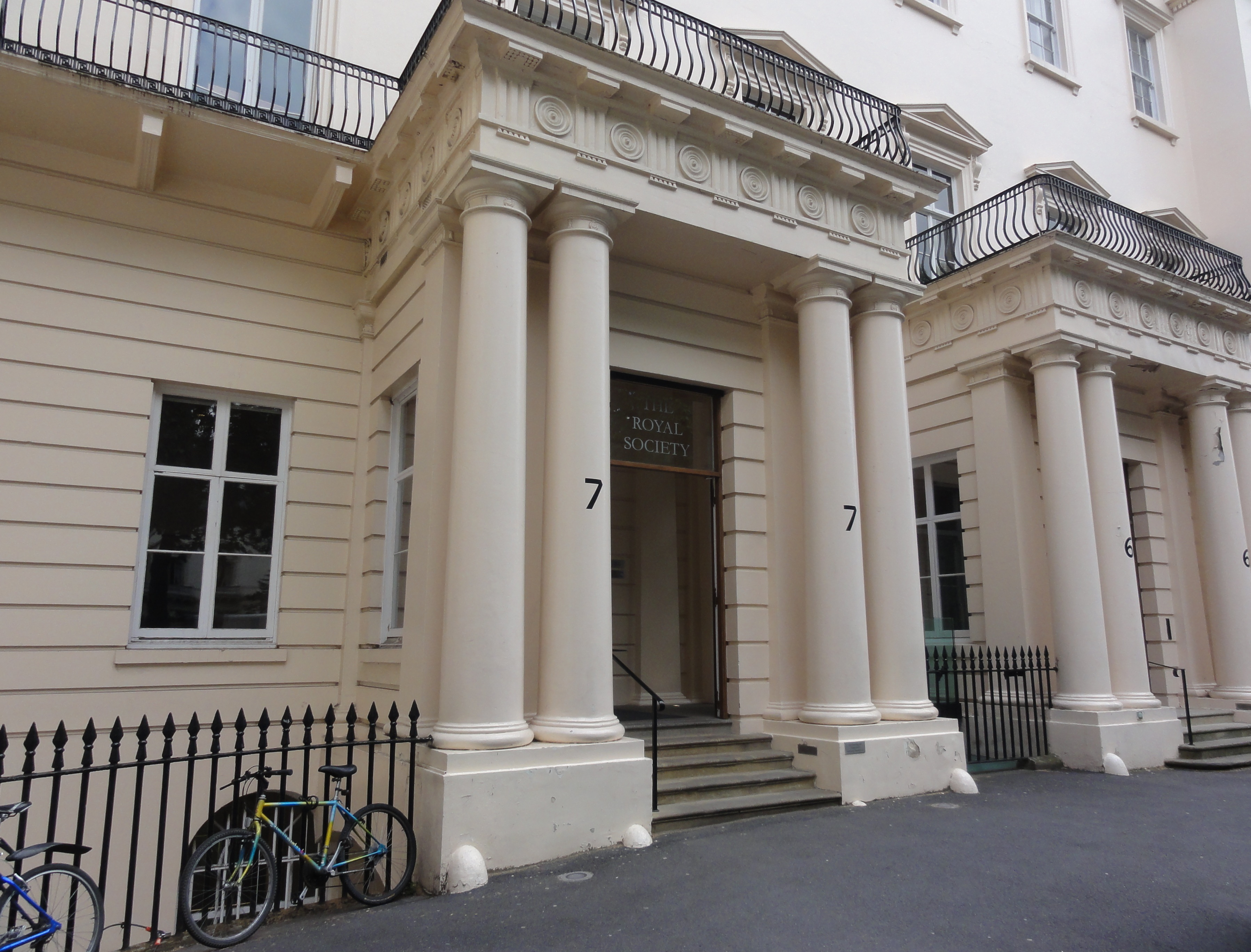
The front door of No. 7

- No. 1 was the home of Joseph Hodges Choate, US Ambassador to the Court of Saint James, from 1899 to 1904. Lord Curzon (Foreign Secretary and Viceroy of India) lived there from 1905 to 1925, and a statue of him stands opposite. It was the headquarters of the Institute of Materials, Minerals and Mining from 1972 to 2015 and in 2020 the lease was owned by the Saudi businessman Salah Hamdan Albluewi.
- No. 2 was the home of the Carlton Club from 1832 to 1835 and is now the United Kingdom offices of the French asset management firm Carmignac.
- Nos. 3–4 house the Royal Academy of Engineering. Number 4 was the home of William Ewart Gladstone (Prime Minister) in 1856 (see also Number 11 below). Lord Revelstoke (Baring family and Barings bank principal partner) lived at Number 3 from 1904 to 1929.
- No. 5 is the home of the Turf Club since 1965. It was leased by Du Pré Alexander, 2nd Earl of Caledon, in 1829, and remained in his family until in June 1939 the contents were sold by Eric Alexander, 5th Earl of Caledon, who had been born in the house in 1885. It was the home of Lord Palmerston from 1840 to 1846, before he was Prime Minister.
- Nos. 6–9 are the home of the Royal Society. Numbers 7–9, then known as Prussia House, was the Prussian, then German Embassy until 1939; that is now in Belgrave Square. The house was home to Joachim von Ribbentrop (German Ambassador) from 1936 to 1938, and his predecessor Leopold von Hoesch. Hoesch's dog Giro is buried in the garden of No 9. The run retains interiors designed in 1937 by Albert Speer.

=== East terrace ===
Nos. 10 and 11

- Nos. 10 and 11 house the British Academy, which has occupied No. 10 since 1998 and No. 11 since 2010. Number 10 was previously the town house of Matthew White Ridley, 1st Viscount Ridley (1842 - 1904) and his Ridley descendents. A "Hospital for Wounded Officers" was temporarily installed in the building during the First World War. William Gladstone lived at No. 11 from 1857 to 1875. Previous occupants included William Crockford. Both properties were previously used by the Union Club in the early 20th century. In the post-war period, the houses were offices for the Information Research Department (IRD), a secret branch of the Foreign Office dedicated to creating pro-colonial and anti-communist propaganda.
- No. 12 now houses the Institute of Contemporary Arts, which also occupies much of the basement of the East Terrace.
- Nos. 13–16 are owned on a long lease by the Hinduja brothers, Indian industrialists. No. 13 was the home of Earl Grey (Prime Minister) from 1851 to 1857 and again from 1859 to 1880. In the 20th century, the Crown Estate had its headquarters in these houses. No. 16 was the home of Crockfords from 1934.
- No. 17 was the home of Lord Cardigan (leader of the Charge of the Light Brigade) from 1832 to 1836 and was leased by Augustus FitzRoy, 7th Duke of Grafton, as his town house, from 1891 until 1901. It is now the home of the Federation of British Artists and the Mall Galleries.
- No. 18 was the home of William Waldorf Astor, 1st Viscount Astor, an American-born business man, between 1906 and 1909. It is still a private residence. At the time of its sale in 2013, for a guide price of £250 million for the remaining 78-year lease, it was described variously as London, or the world's, most expensive house.

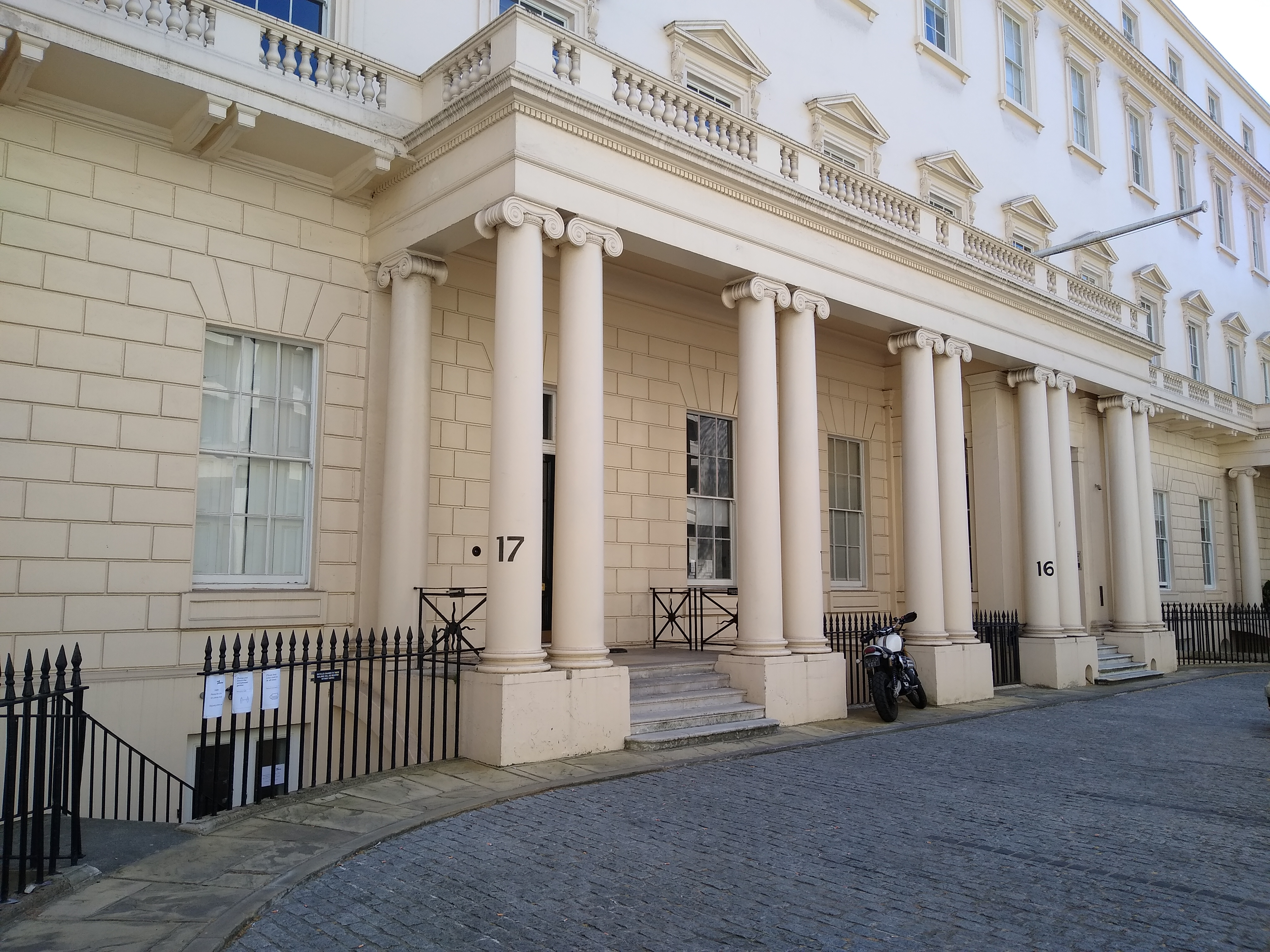
Nos. 16 and 17

=== Numbers 19 to 24 ===
These were of later construction, built on the site of the Carlton House riding stables between 1866 and 1868.

- No. 20 is the global headquarters of mining company Anglo American plc.
- Ashraf Marwan, an Egyptian arms dealer and spy, died after falling from his flat in number 24.

== Carlton Gardens ==
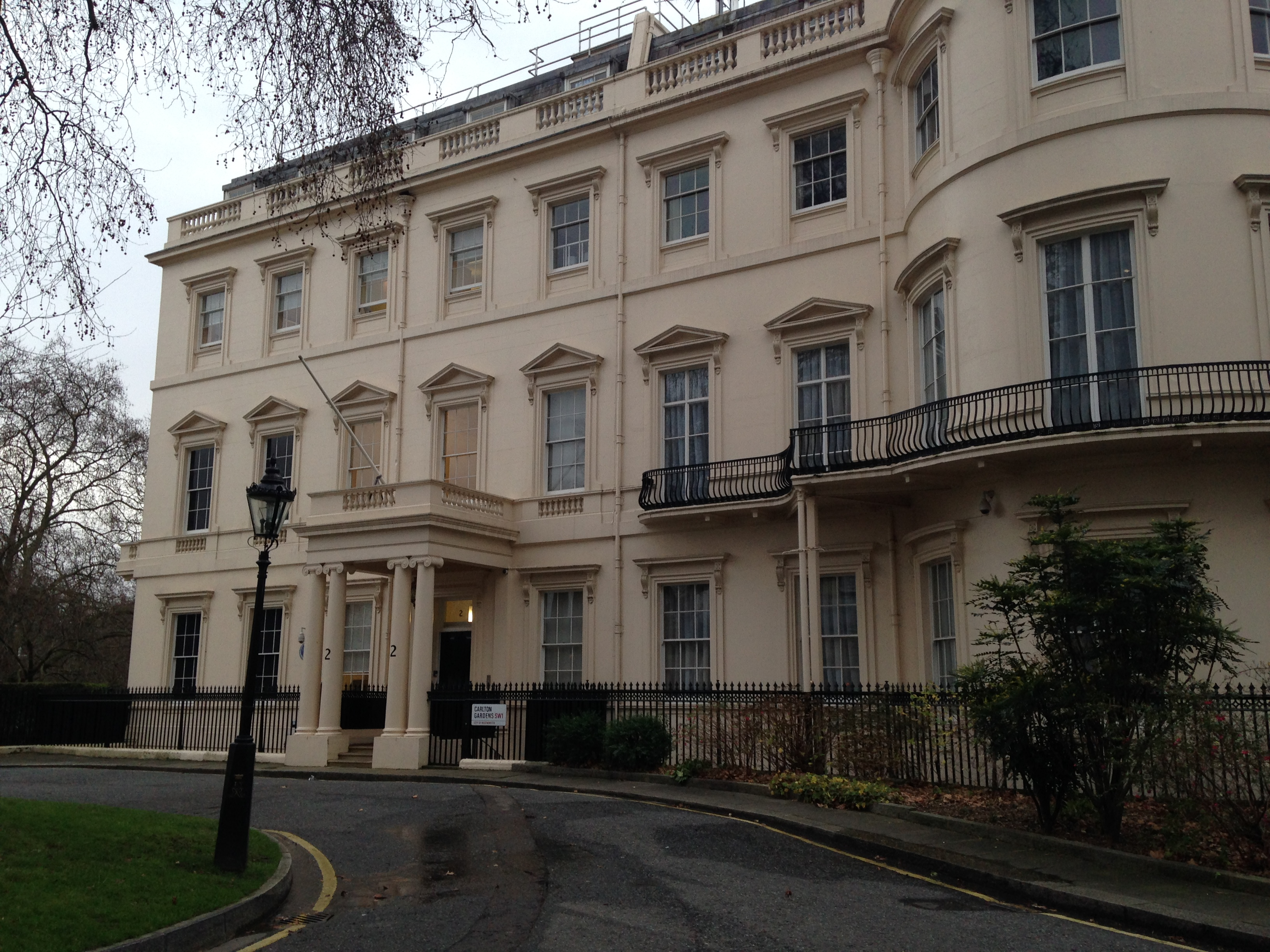
No. 2, Carlton Gardens

At the west end of Carlton House Terrace is Carlton Gardens. Stirling House, on the north side, was designed by James Stirling in 1989.

=== Occupants ===
- Number 1 is an official ministerial residence normally used by the foreign secretary. Previous occupants included F. J. Robinson, 1st Viscount Goderich (1832–59), Prime Minister between 1827 and 1828; his son, George Robinson, 1st Marquess of Ripon (1847–89); Napoleon III (1840); Alfred Harmsworth, 1st Viscount Northcliffe (1920–22), the newspaper magnate and Viscount Bearsted (from 1928), son of the founder of Shell plc and later its chairman.
- Number 2 is the headquarters of the Institute for Government and was previously occupied by the Privy Council Office. Residents prior to this included: Elizabeth Mary Huskisson (1831–50), widow of the politician William Huskisson; Robert Loyd-Lindsay, founder of the British Red Cross, inherited Number 2 from his father-in-law Samuel Jones-Loyd, 1st Baron Overstone in 1883; it remained his London residence until his death in 1901. His widow Lady Wantage later briefly leased Number 2 to Lord Kitchener. Following the sale of Devonshire House in 1920 by the Dukes of Devonshire, Number 2 became the home of Victor Cavendish, 9th Duke of Devonshire. His son Edward continued to live at the house until it was damaged by bombing during the Second World War.
- Number 3 was firstly the home of Charles Arbuthnot (1831–35), diarist and confidante of the Duke of Wellington. Between 1927 and 1931, it was owned by Courtenay Morgan, 1st Viscount Tredegar. MI6's Section Y was housed in Number 3, Carlton Gardens after the Second World War. The analytics department was headed by Col. Tom Grimson. His deputy, the traitor George Blake, was brought to Number 3 for interrogation after his capture in 1961. Since 2019 it has been owned by the hedge fund manager Ken Griffin.
- Number 4 was home to two Prime Ministers, Lord Palmerston and Arthur Balfour. It later served as Charles de Gaulle's government in exile, Free France. There is now a statue of Charles de Gaulle in front of it.
- Number 5 was home to Sidney Herbert, 1st Baron Herbert of Lea (1846–51), politician and close friend of Florence Nightingale.
- Number 6 was home to William Gladstone (1838–41 and 1848–54), and members of his family.
- Number 7 was home to Frances, Countess Waldegrave (1854–79).

== Historic listing designations ==
Both terrace blocks are Grade I listed buildings. The buildings comprising Carlton Gardens have three listings, all at Grade II*, for No.1, No.2, and for No.3. Twenty seven lamp standards illuminating the terrace and garden are listed at Grade II. A pair of bollards outside No.4 Carlton House Terrace also has a Grade II listing.

== Gallery ==
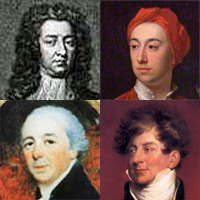
Clockwise from top left: Carleton, Burlington, the Prince Regent and John Nash

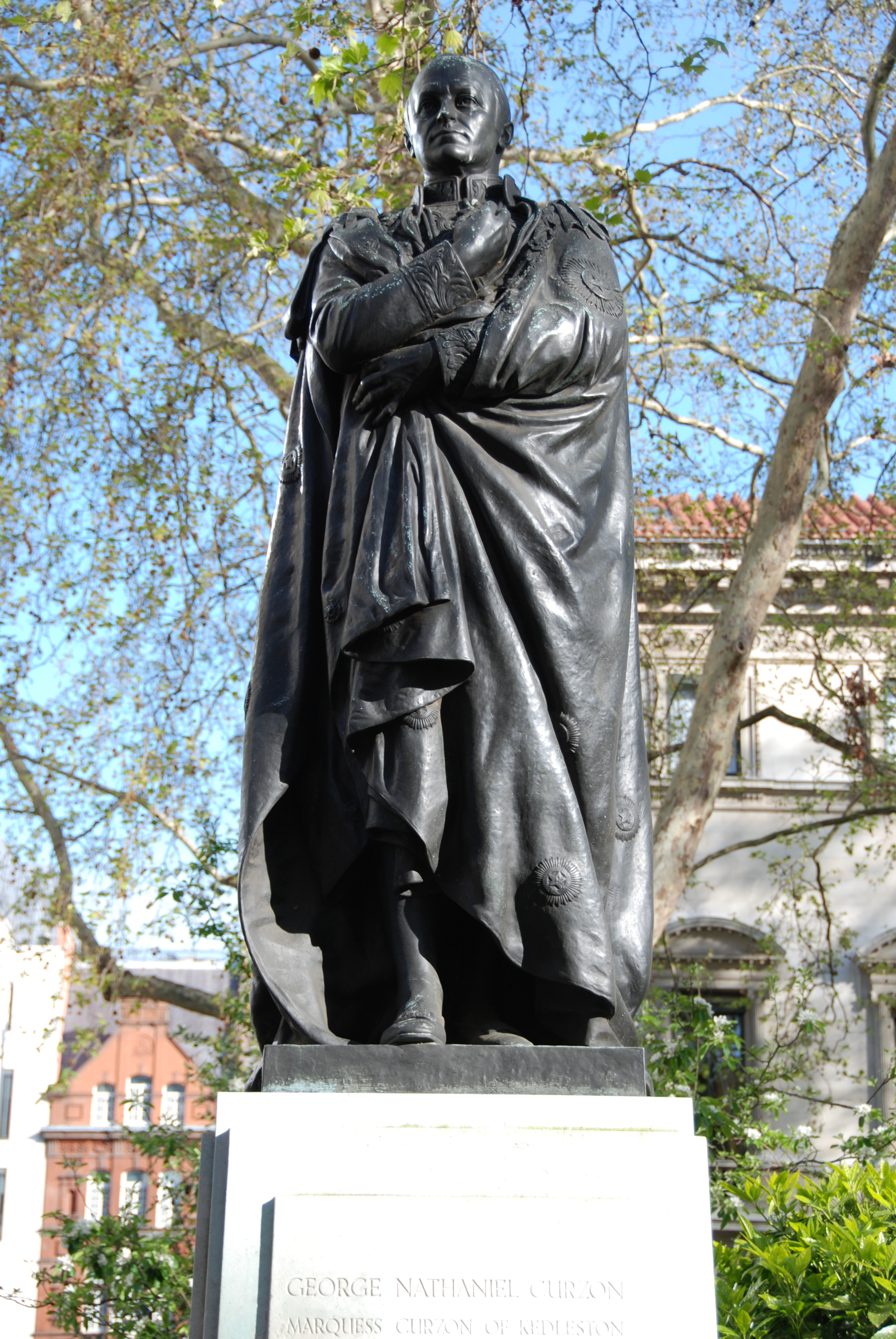
Statue of Lord Curzon

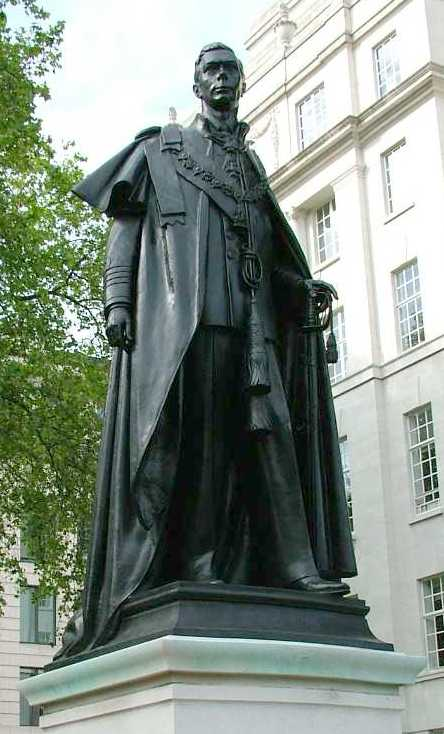
Statue of King George VI

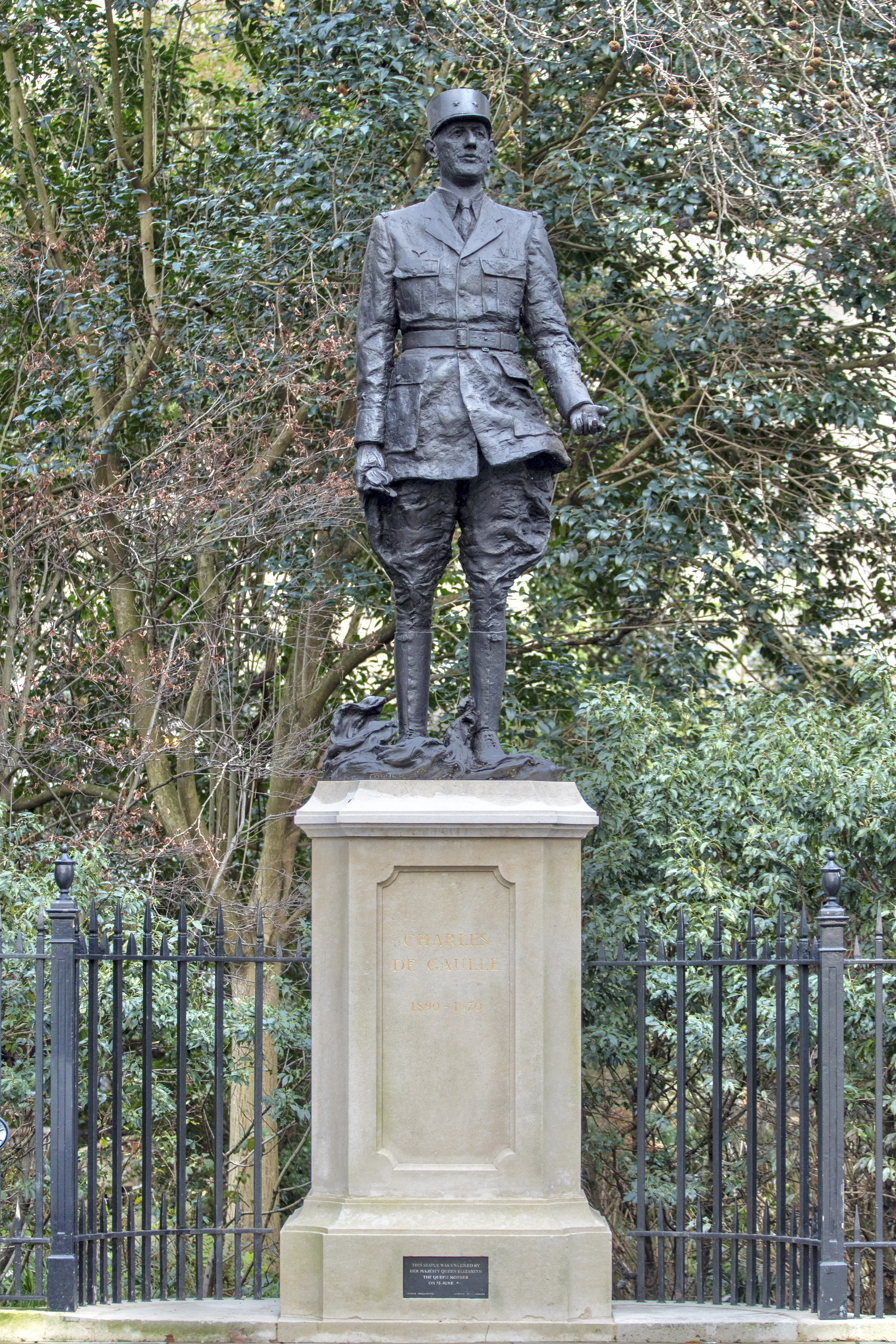
Statue of Charles de Gaulle

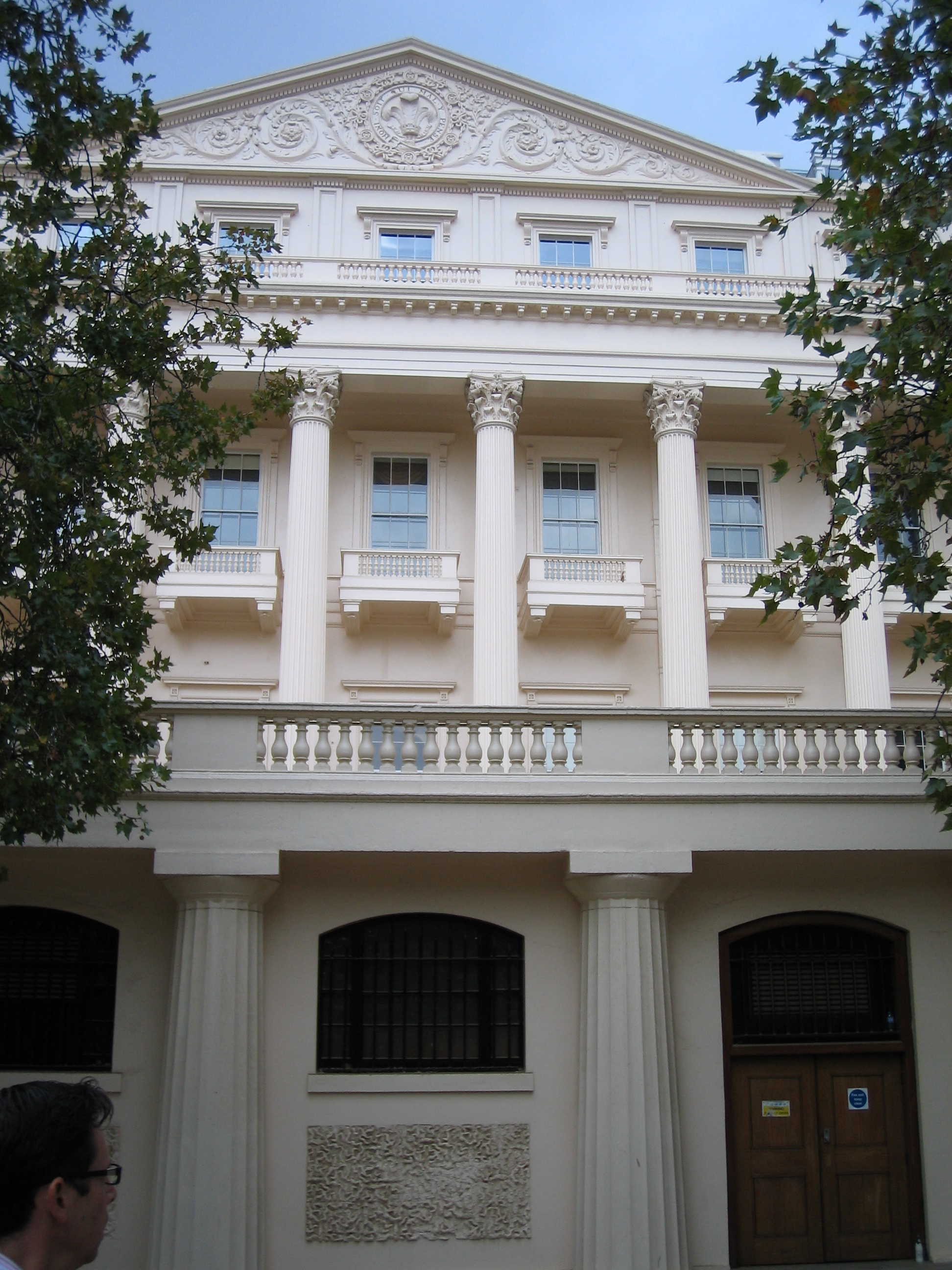
The terrace seen from the south, with the squat Doric columns at ground level and the Corinthian columns and pediment above

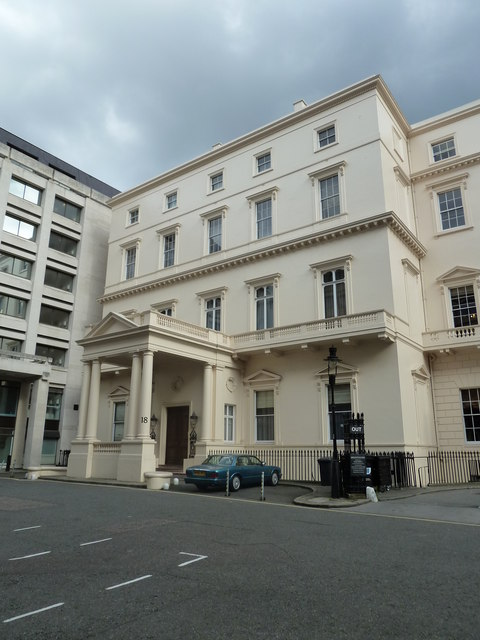
Number 18 Carlton House Terrace

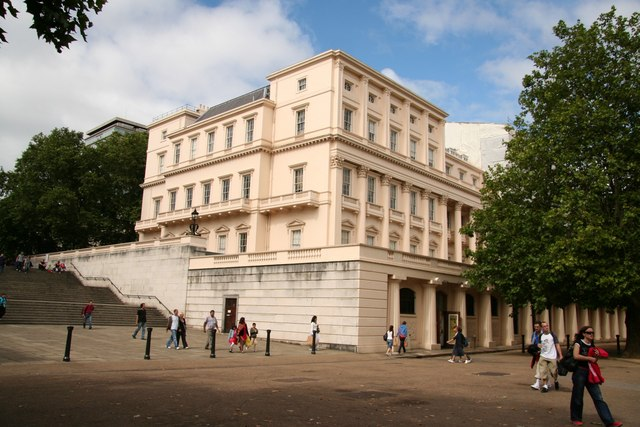
The East Terrace and the Duke of York's Steps

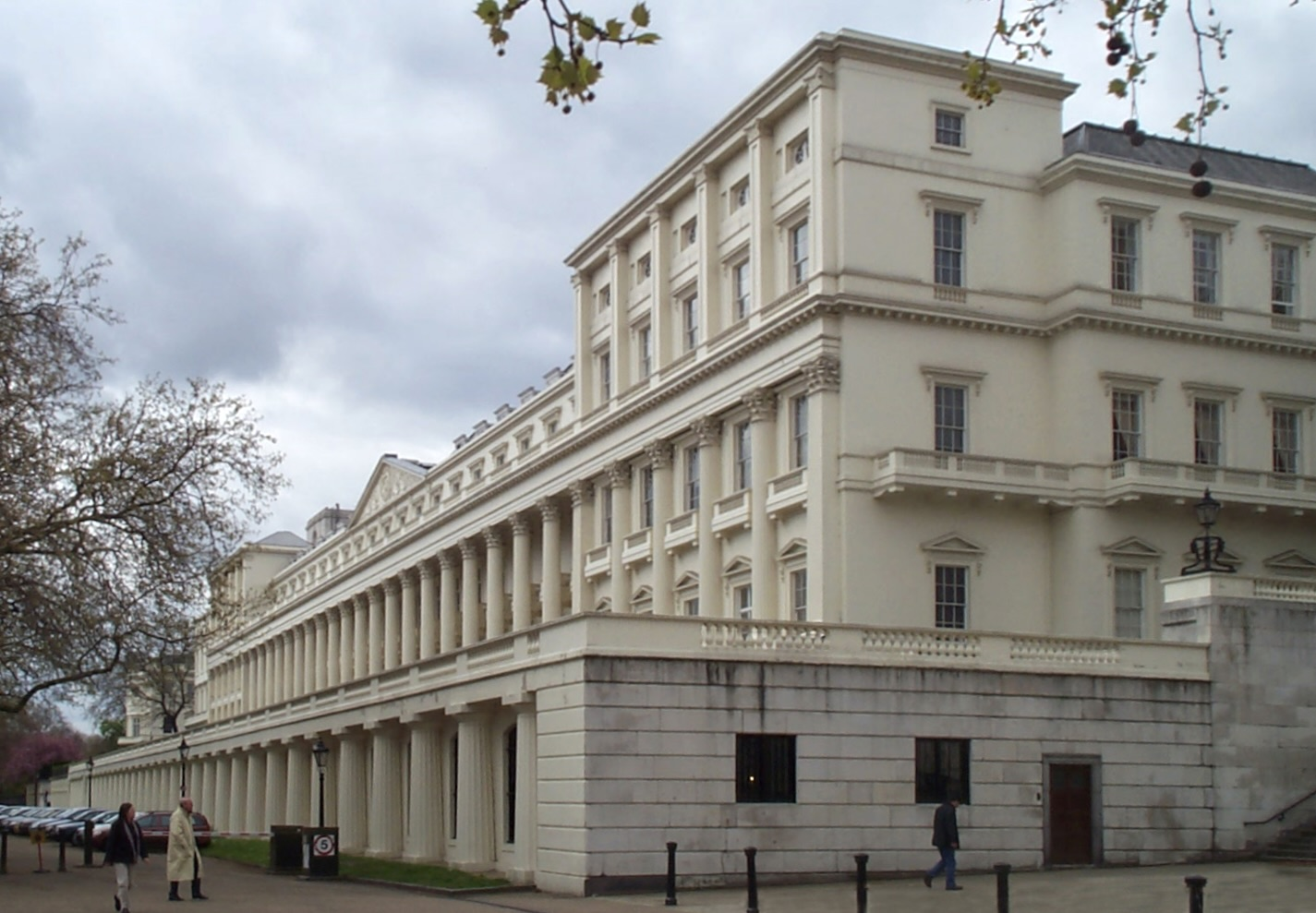
Panorama of the West Terrace. Numbers 8 and 9, formerly the German Embassy and now the home of the Royal Society, are the tall houses at the near end of the terrace

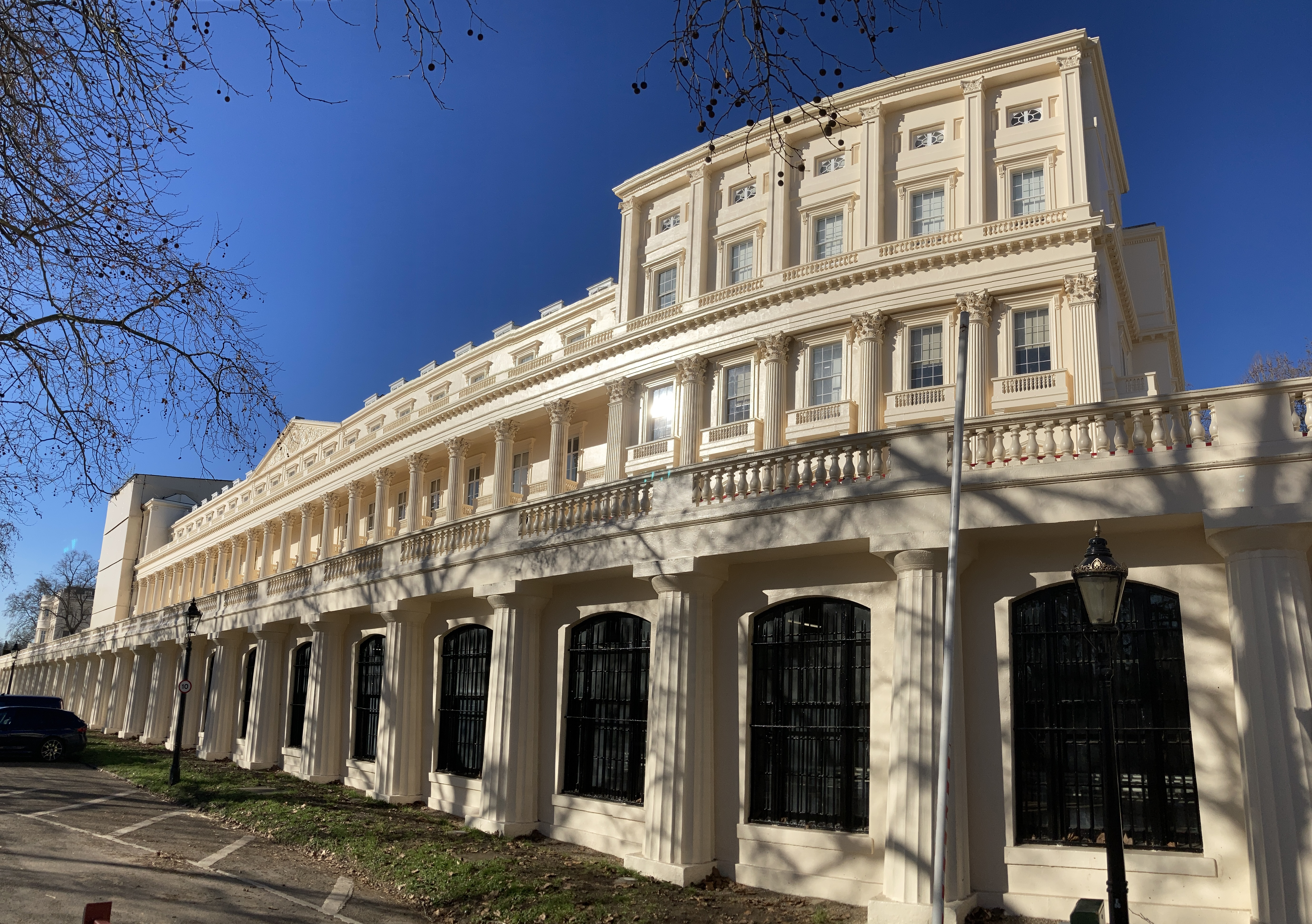
Panorama of The Mall frontage of the West Terrace

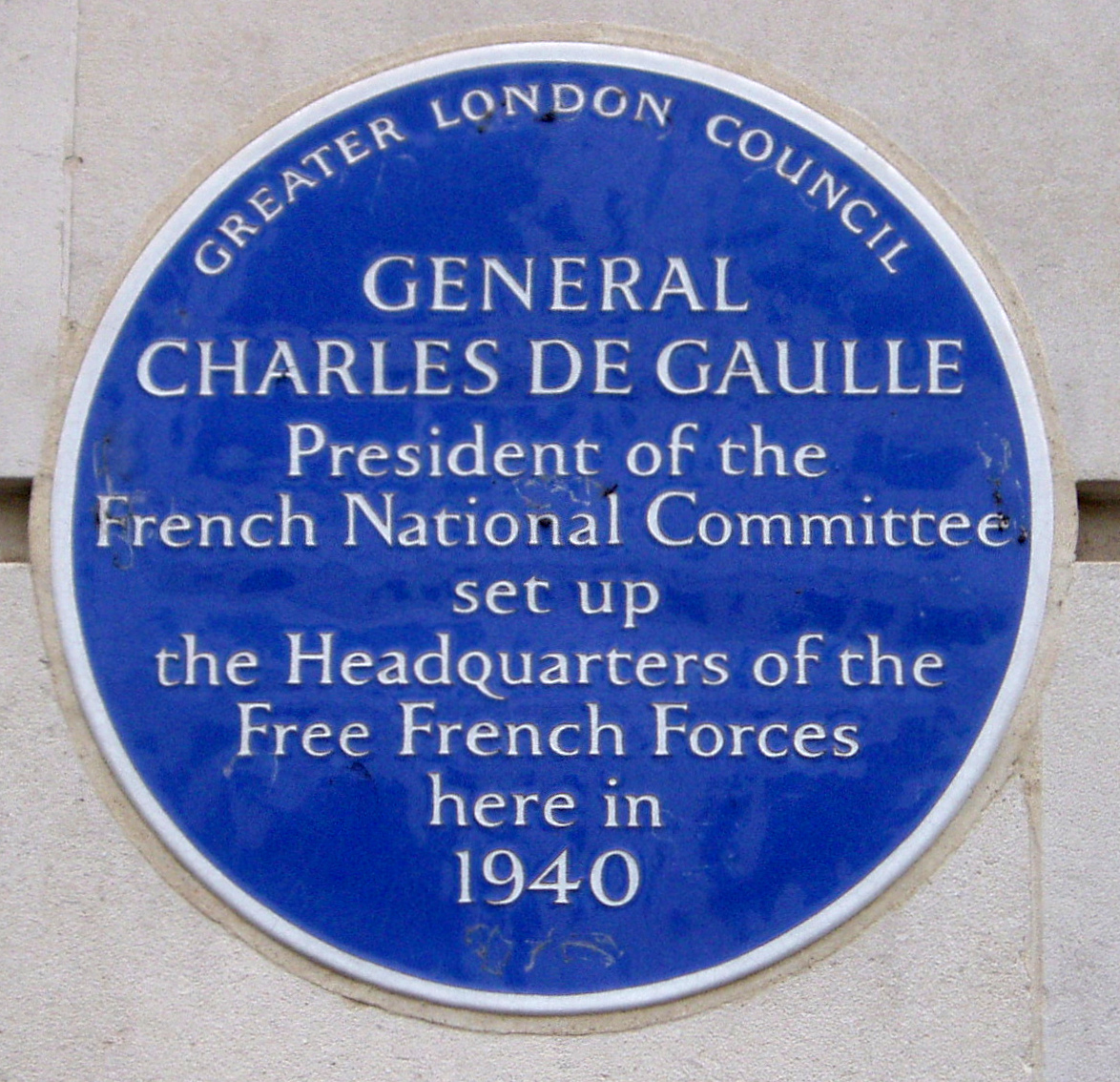
The plaque commemorating the headquarters of General de Gaulle at 4 Carlton Gardens in London during World War II
