= BCM (Fareva) =

BCM Ltd
- Company type: Subsidiary, Private Limited Company (02741673)
- Industry: Health and beauty products
- Founded: Nottingham, England (1991)
- Headquarters: D10 Fourth 142, Nottingham, NG90 2PR
- Area served: Worldwide
- Products: Medicines, cosmetics, soaps
- Revenue: £226 million (2011)
- Number of employees: c.2,000 (1,600, UK)
- Parent: Fareva

BCM is part of Fareva, a subcontractor in the industrial and household, cosmetics and pharmaceuticals fields.

BCM operates in Beeston, Nottinghamshire in the UK. On 30 June 2023 Fareva announced their intention to cease all manufacturing operations on the Beeston site within 12 months.

== History ==
BCM (Boots Contract Manufacturing) originated as the in-house manufacturing arm of Boots The Chemist. Boots expanded the BCM business into Vitre, France (BCMC - BCM Cosmétique) and Dietzenbach, Germany (BCMK - BCM Kosmetik) with each factory focusing on particular portfolios. As well as manufacturing Boots' own brands of products, BCM would undertake contract manufacturing work for third party pharmaceutical and personal care companies.

In 2017 the now Global WBA (Walgreens Boots Alliance) sold its manufacturing plants to Fareva, a global contract manufacturing company. WBA and Fareva entered into a 10-year partnership agreement, whereby Fareva would be WBA's partner of choice for product manufacturing.

== Products ==
BCM manufactured consumer health and beauty products for Walgreens Boots Alliance and other famous brands, as well as special prescription medicines for individual use in the UK through BCM Specials.
