= Gilles Martin (businessman) =

French engineer and businessman

- Born: October 20, 1963 (age 63); Paris, Ile-de-France, France
- Education: École Centrale Paris, Syracuse University
- Occupations: Engineer, scientist and businessperson
- Known for: Founder and executive chairman of Eurofins Scientific and billionaire

Gilles Martin (born 20 October 1963) is a French engineer, scientist and billionaire. He is the founder and executive chairman of Eurofins Scientific.

== Early life and education ==
Martin's parents, Maryvonne Lucie Martin and Gérard-Jean Martin, were both chemistry professors at the University of Nantes. Gilles attended Centrale Paris where he dedicated a large part of his time to creating a company specialized in mathematics learning, Objectif Maths, alongside his friend Hervé Lecat, to whom he later sold his shares.

Martin then went on to work as a research assistant at Syracuse University, where he developed a diagnostic system using magnetic resonance imaging. After obtaining a master's degree and a PhD, he returned to France.

== Career ==
Originally, Martin's parents had patented a process for measuring sugar levels in wines, and entrusted their children Gilles and his brother Yves-Loïc with the development and marketing of the process. Eurofins Scientific was launched in 1987. Gilles bought the patent from the Scientific Research National Center (CNRS), discovered new applications for the patent, and expanded the company's clientele to the entire food industry. The company quickly reached 50 employees and exported 70% of its production.

Eurofins then proceeded to massively buy out other laboratories, including by financing laboratories in start-up mode. This aggressive acquisition policy allowed the company to reach 50,000 employees by 2020.

== Wealth ==
According to Forbes, Gilles Martin owns about 25% of Eurofins' capital through the family's holding company Analytical Bioventures. His fortune is estimated to be $5.2 billion, making him the 757th richest person in the world (as of December 2021).

== Recognition ==
- 2007 National Entrepreneur Award

== See also ==
- List of French people
- Forbes list of billionaires
- List of billionaires
