= Giro (dog) =

Terrier dog owned by a German ambassador to the United Kingdom

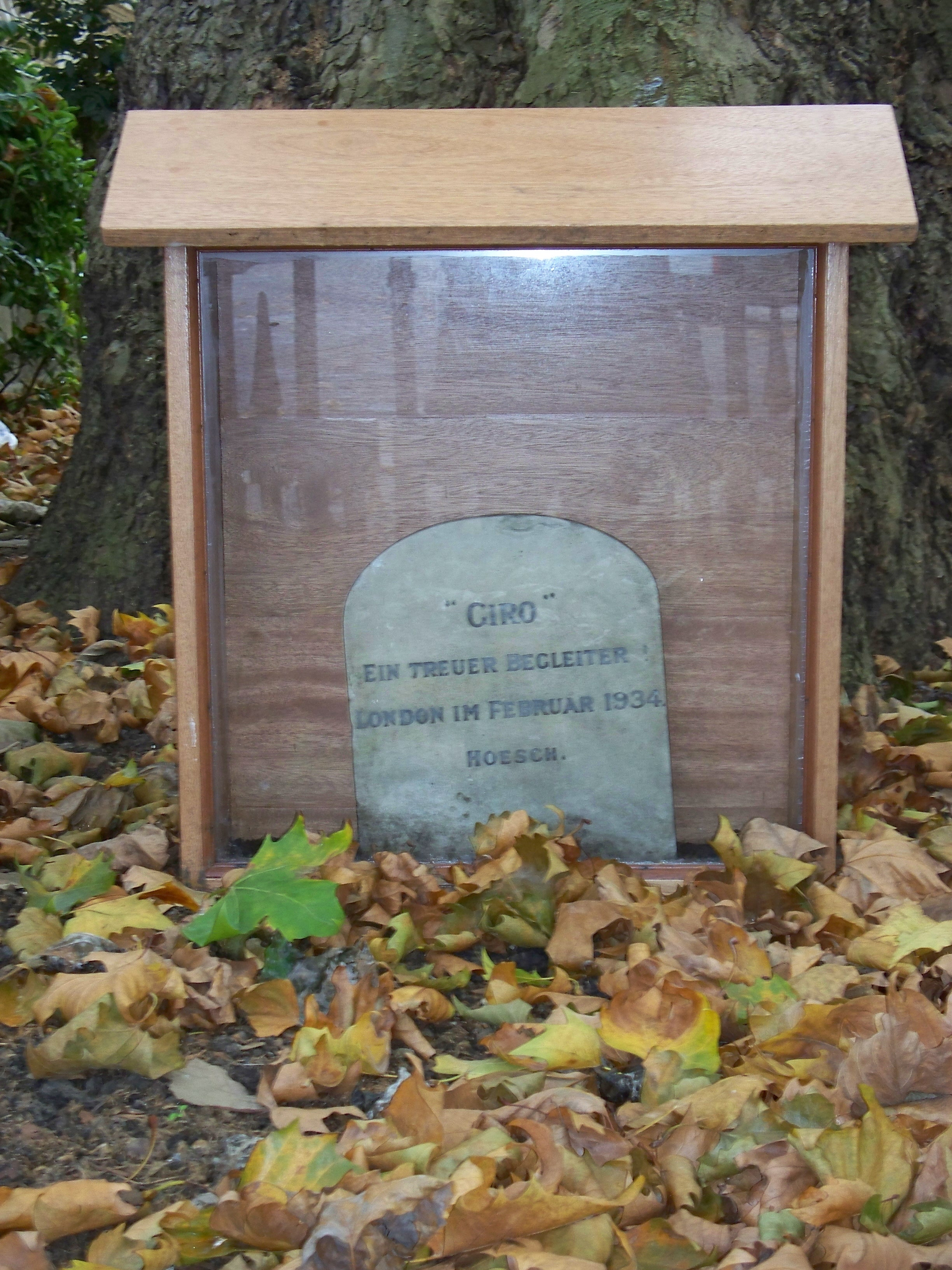
The grave of Giro, von Hoesch's dog, stands outside the former German Embassy in London.

Giro was a terrier dog, or according to some accounts, a German Shepherd that belonged to the German ambassador to the United Kingdom, Leopold von Hoesch. Giro died in 1934 after chewing through some electrical cable and was buried in the garden of the former German embassy at 9 Carlton House Terrace. Giro's owner died of a heart attack in April 1936 and his body was ceremonially returned to Germany.

Giro's tombstone was moved in the late 1960s to its present location following building work. It has been described as Britain's only Nazi memorial. Flowers are put on Giro's tombstone every February.

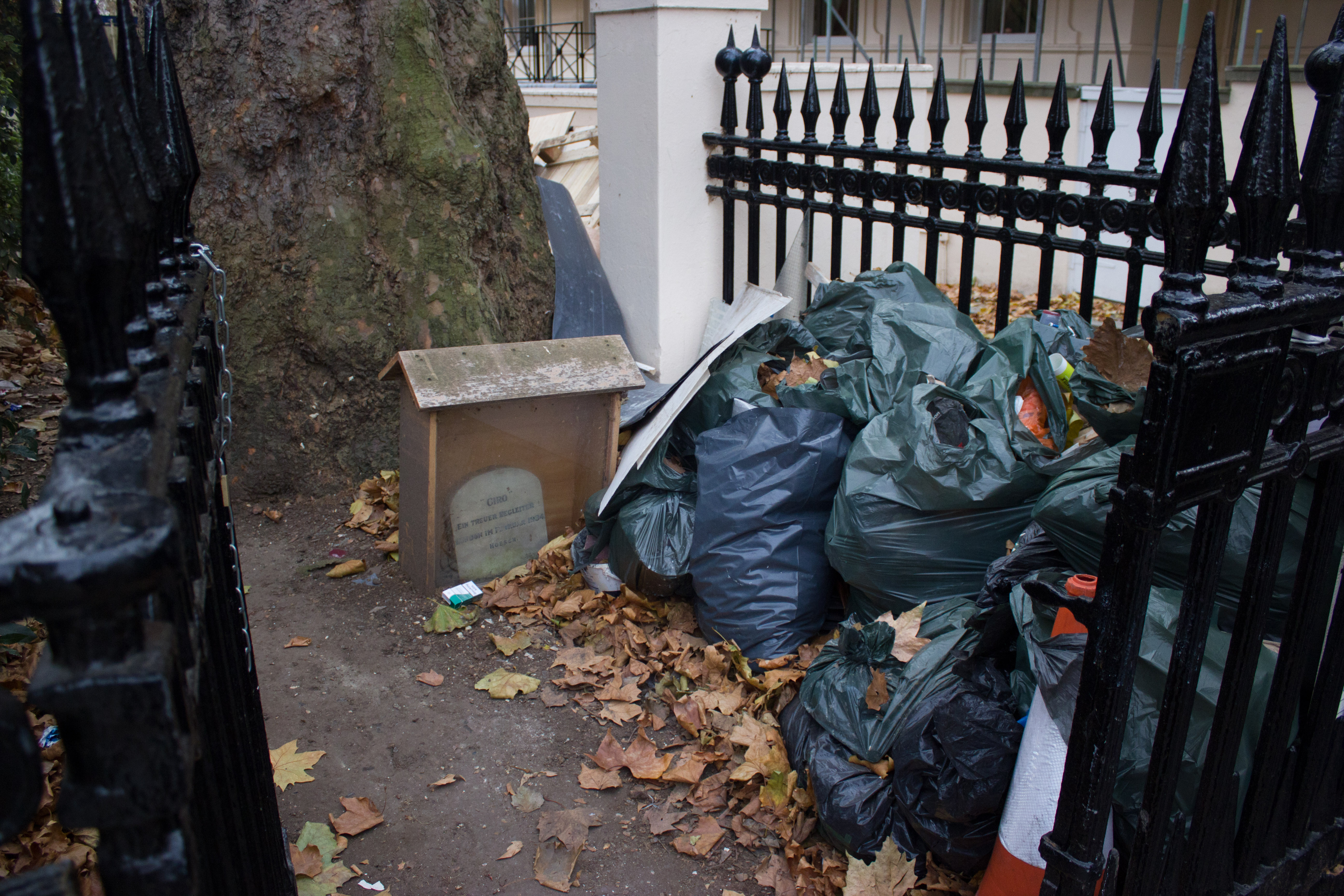
The grave in 2011, surrounded with bags of garbage

== Gravestone text ==
"Giro"
Ein Treuer Begleiter
London Im Februar 1934
Hoesch.
EN: "Giro"
A faithful companion!
London in February 1934.
Hoesch.

== See also ==
- List of individual dogs
