= Alain Taravella =

French businessman

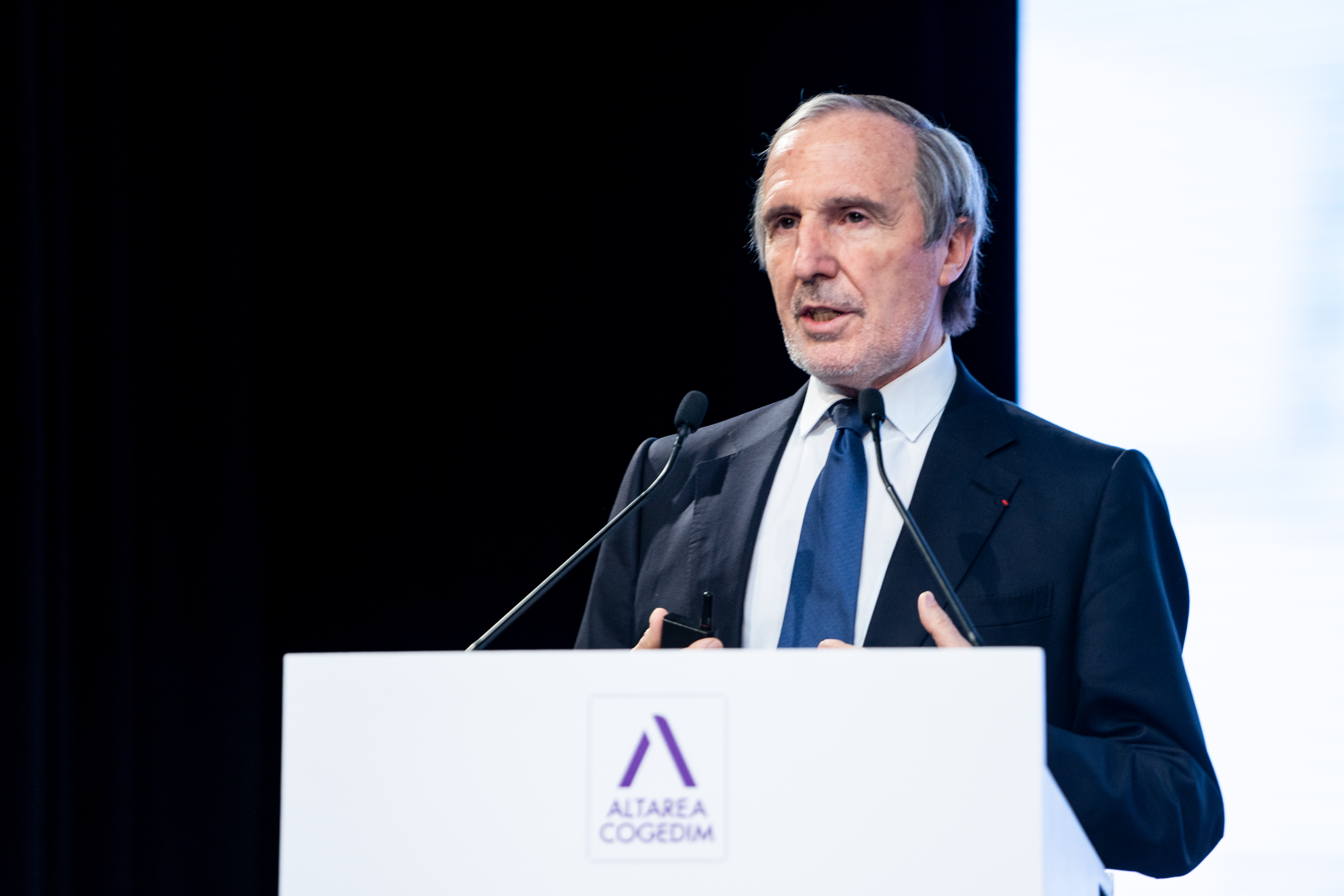
- Taravella in 2019
- Born: 24 May 1948 (age 78); Falaise, Calvados, France
- Education: HEC Paris
- Occupations: Businessman, entrepreneur
- Known for: Co-founder and CEO of the real estate group Altarea SCA

Alain Taravella (born 24 May 1948) is a French entrepreneur, billionaire who is the co-founder, chairman and CEO of the Altarea SCA real estate group.

== Early life and education ==
Taravella graduated from HEC Paris in 1971. He claims to have financed his studies by carrying out real estate operations on the sale of apartments in Parly.

== Career ==
In 1975, he joined the Brémond group, a real estate development company, where he became head of the leisure division. The group became Pierre & Vacances in 1978, a company specialized in leisure centers. Taravella became CEO in 1985.

In 1994, he founded Altarea, a shopping center development company. He took advantage of the downturn in the real estate market in the early 1990s to acquire land in droves. In 1999, he worked on the Bercy Village development project, which Altarea marketed. The company was listed on the stock exchange in 2004 and in 2007 acquired Cogedim, a real estate developer of housing and offices.

In 2010, after selling the Saint-Georges shopping center in Toulouse to the German Commerz Real, he led the acquisition of Cap 3000, one of the oldest and most important regional shopping centers in France, in Saint-Laurent-du-Var. In 2011, he led the acquisition by Cogedim Altarea of the RueDuCommerce shopping site, which was finally sold to Carrefour in 2016.

== Wealth ==
As of 2021, according to Forbes, Taravella retains 45% ownership of Altarea SCA and had an estimated net worth of $2 billion, making him the 1580th richest person in the world.
