= Leopold von Hoesch =

German diplomat (1881–1936)

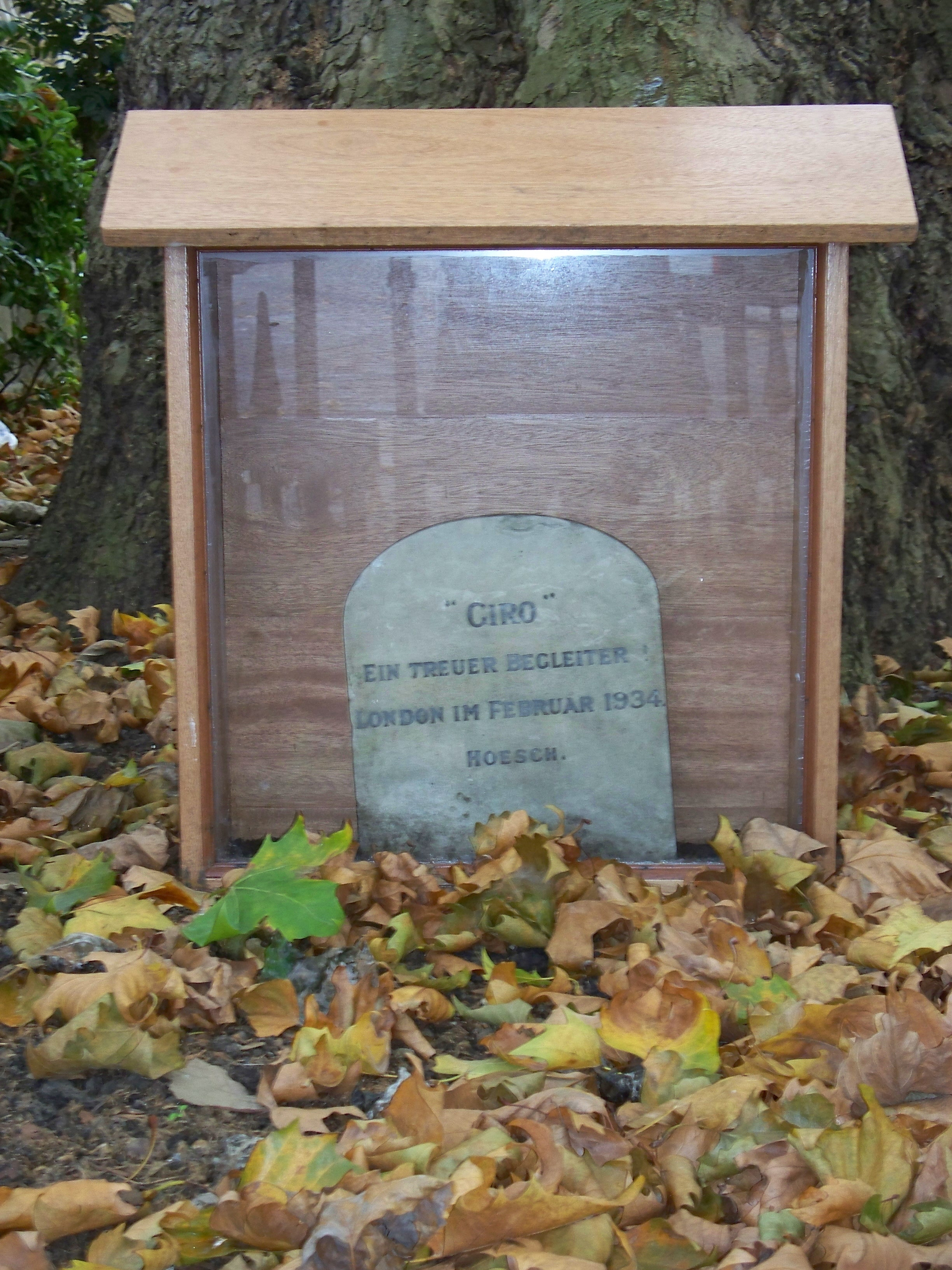
The grave of Giro, von Hoesch's dog, stands outside the former German Embassy in London.

Leopold von Hoesch (10 June 1881 – 10 April 1936) was a career German diplomat. Hoesch began his political career in France as the chargé d'affaires in 1923. After the recall of the German ambassador in 1923 after the Ruhr crisis, Hoesch was appointed acting head of the German Embassy in Paris. There, Hoesch worked closely with German Foreign Minister Gustav Stresemann. Hoesch played an important role in the Locarno Treaty of 1924.

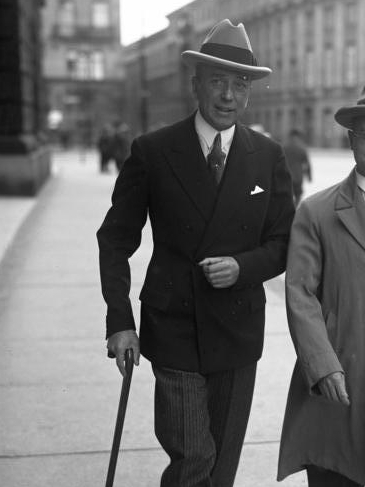
Leopold von Hoesch, 1932

In November 1932, Hoesch was transferred to the United Kingdom, where he would stay until his death in 1936. Hoesch was well liked by most British statesmen, including Anthony Eden and Sir John Simon. His reputation among the British as a knowledgeable and able-minded statesman helped to enhance Anglo-German relations in the early 1930s.

With the Nazi takeover in 1933, little changed at first between Germany and the United Kingdom politically. However, by 1934, Hoesch was beginning to challenge Adolf Hitler indirectly by sending communiqués to German Foreign Minister Konstantin von Neurath that detailed Hoesch's distrust of Joachim von Ribbentrop, whom Hitler had appointed to serve as Commissioner of Disarmament Questions.

The relationship between Hoesch and Hitler continued to sour as Ribbentrop gained more power within the German government. By 1936, Hoesch was quickly becoming a thorn in Hitler's side. After the remilitarization of the Rhineland on 7 March 1936, Hoesch wrote to Neurath by denouncing the act as an action designed to provoke the French and ultimately the British.

Less than one month later, at 10 am 11 April 1936, Hoesch died of a heart attack while he was dressing in his bedroom at the German Embassy. After his death, he was honoured with a large British-ordered funeral cortège in which his coffin - draped in the Nazi Party flag - was escorted to Dover where a 19-gun salute was fired as his body was transferred to the British destroyer HMS Scout for transport back to Germany. Hoesch's dog Giro, who died in 1934 after chewing an electric cable, is buried in London in the garden of the former German Embassy at 9 Carlton House Terrace.

He was replaced by Ribbentrop, Hitler's favourite foreign policy advisor, who would later be hanged for war crimes.

Diplomatic posts
Preceded by Konstantin von Neurath	German Ambassador to the Court of St. James; 1932–1936	Succeeded by Joachim von Ribbentrop
