= Viracor-IBT Laboratories =

Viracor Eurofins Laboratories is a diagnostic laboratory specializing in infectious disease, immunology and allergy testing for immunocompromised and critical patients. Viracor Eurofins works with medical professionals, transplant teams, reference labs and bio-pharmaceutical companies.

Viracor-IBT has CLIA clinical laboratory certification as both an Infectious Disease Laboratory and as an Allergy & Immunology Laboratory.

== History ==
Viracor-IBT was created through the merger of two specialty diagnostic testing labs, Viracor Laboratories and IBT Laboratories. Founded by Dr. Konstance Knox and Dr. Donald Carrigan in Milwaukee County in 2000, Viracor was among the first to commercially offer real-time quantitative PCR assays to diagnose patients with Adenovirus, BK virus and JC virus, among others. Founded in 1983, IBT was the first laboratory to offer a test to definitively diagnose autoimmune causes of chronic hives and developed the first commercially available test to measure pneumococcal antibodies.

On 1 July 2014, Ampersand Capital Partners completed the sale of Viracor-IBT Laboratories to Eurofins Scientific for $255 million. The company continued to be known as Viracor-IBT.

== Expertise ==
The core areas of expertise for Viracor-IBT are:

- Custom Assay Development
- Infectious Disease Testing
- Immune Monitoring
- Biomarkers & Bioanalyitics
