= Tati (company) =

Textile store chain in France

Tati SA
- Native name: Tati
- Company type: Private
- Founded: 1948 in Barbès, Paris, France
- Founder: Jules Ouaki
- Defunct: July 2020
- Key people: Jules Ouaki; Fabien Ouaki; Eléonore Ouaki
- Net income: € 30,333,705 (2018)
- Website: tati.fr

Tati was a French brand known for selling inexpensive textile goods. Its stores were present in France, as well as in United Arab Emirates, Iran, Morocco, Tunisia, and Saudi Arabia. Against the backdrop of a competitive clothing market, the brand failed to renew itself and react. Tati therefore experienced a decline year after year and was almost completely gone by 2020.

== Company history ==
=== Ouaki period ===
The "Tati" sign was created in 1948 by Jules Ouaki, a Sephardic Jewish saddler from the La Goulette district of Tunis in Tunisia, who settled in France after World War II. A pioneer in the market for low-cost textile items, he created the first 50 m^{2} self-service “Textile Diffusion” discount store in the Barbès-Rochechouart district in Paris. He then moved to n^{o}4 Boulevard Barbès to the location of the Dupont Barbès brewery.

Jules Ouaki then chooses for the name of his brand "Tati", anagram of Tita, nickname of his mother Esther, the Tita brand having already been registered.

The original presentation of the merchandise, the association of a logo with a gingham type pattern and the brand name in wholesale, plus the slogan "Tati, les plus bas prix” (transl. Tati, the lowest prices), allowed rapid development.

Until 1978, the brand had a single store, in boulevard de Rochechouart, which expanded onto the neighboring streets. From that date onward, the company developed and established itself in other Parisian neighborhoods on rue de Rennes, on the outskirts of Place de la République, then in other cities in France such as Nancy, Lille, Rouen, Marseille, and Lyon.

Jules Ouaki died at the age of 67, on April 25, 1983, due to consequences of cancer. After the death in an accident of Jules Ouaki's eldest son, Gregory, who had taken over his father's business, the company faltered. In 1991, Jules Ouaki's widow asked her youngest son, Fabien Ouaki, who had joined the company in the purchasing department, to take over the brand. Fabien Ouaki bought the family shares of the company and took control of the brand. Tati then developed a little more, opening seven other specialized stores: "Tati Or" (transl. Tati Gold), "Tati Mariage" (transl. Tati Wedding), "Tati Vacances" (transl. Tati Holidays) and "Tati Optic" (transl. Tati Optics), as well as a collection created by Azzedine Alaïa with houndstooth patterns, with Naomi Campbell for the presentation parade.

From 1994, the group established itself in Europe and abroad: in South Africa in 1996 and in the United States in 1998 where it opened a store of wedding dresses Tati Mariage (which then contributed 20% to the Tati's turnover) on Fifth Avenue in New York City.

With losses being generated since 1993, Tati was left behind by new brands such as Kiabi, H&M and Zara. The textile market was then in recession and Tati, with its very low prices, was one of the first brands affected. These multiple unfavorable economic events (failures of upscaling and diversification, marketing mistakes by the owner of the brand) lead the company to suspend payments. On July 26, 2004, Fabien Ouaki was then obliged to sell the company to settle a colossal debt.

=== Éram period ===
The brand was bought by Vetura, a 50% subsidiary of the Éram group, for 10 million euros, to which was added a maximum of 4.5 million euros for store stocks, as part of a disposal plan in order to relaunch its development. Tati then intended to open more than fifteen stores in France. Projects were also planned in the North African countries and in Eastern Europe, notably in Romania. In 2007, Tati was taken over 100% by the Éram group, which abandoned inconsistent diversification and destocking and took control of the creation, with 70% of the clothing designed in-house by a team of stylists.

While the brand had 80 points of sale across France, it opened its merchant website in May 2010 which then offered more than 7,000 items, 15,000 in 2011.

From 2013, the company has 129 points of sale in France. It aimed to target no longer the 25% of households earning less than 20,000 euros per year, but 75% of French women. In February 2017, Éram was finally forced to put up its subsidiary Agora for sale, which includes Tati, Giga Store, Degrif'Mania and Fabio Lucci. Three takeover offers were being studied by the commercial court of Bobigny, including Philippe Ginestet's proposal proposing investments of several tens of thousands of euros.

=== Gifi period ===
On June 26, 2017, the commercial court of Bobigny designated the Gifi group as the buyer of the brand. Gifi's offer saved 1,428 jobs out of the 1,700 threatened, by keeping 109 of the 140 stores for at least two years, as Philippe Ginestet undertook. Despite the investment of 150 million euros, in June 2018, the recovery turned out to be "complicated". In July, a store was suddenly closed in Chambray-lès-Tours.

On July 16, 2019, the Gifi group announced the passage of Tati stores by 2020 under its brand, with the exception of that of Barbès, 13 others due to close and around thirty sold for the opening of a new brand; 189 jobs were threatened.

In the summer of 2019, employees contacted the government to protest against the PSE planned by Tati. The government informed union representatives that the social plan planned by Tati will be closely monitored so that as many jobs as possible can be kept.

In July 2020, the management announced the closure of the store located on Boulevard Barbès in Paris. Its 34 employees were made redundant. Four other stores located in the provinces were closed and a fifth which operated in Agde (Hérault) was sold.

== Diversification ==
=== Tati Mariage ===
Tati Mariage owned around eighty models of wedding dresses, and also has a wide range of accessories.

=== Tati Vacances ===
The license for the exclusive use and exploitation of the Tati Vacances brand was originally granted to the Comptoir Bleu company in 2000. From 2002, the license for operation of the Tati Vacances brand is owned by the Karavel group.

=== Tati Or ===
There were twenty-two Tati Or stores in France.
