= Édouard Carmignac =

French entrepreneur (born 1947)

- Born: 5 September 1947; Paris, France
- Education: Columbia Business School; University of Paris
- Occupation: Fund manager

Edouard Carmignac (born 5 September 1947 in Paris) is a French entrepreneur. In 1989 he founded Carmignac, an independent and family-owned asset management firm, for which he has acted as chairman and CEO ever since.

He founded Fondation Carmignac in 2000 to promote modern art and created the Carmignac annual photojournalism award in 2009.

== Early life and education ==
Édouard Carmignac was born on September 5, 1947, in Paris to Pierre Carmignac and Simone Pinaud. He grew up in Peru, where his father ran an import-export business, and studied at a British school, Markham College, until the age of 12. He then received a master's degree in economics from the Sorbonne in 1969, followed by an MBA from Columbia University's Business School in 1972.

== Career ==
After finishing his studies, Edouard Carmignac began his career in finance as a financial analyst at Blyth Eastman Dillon in 1972, a New York-based investment bank, where he "learned the ropes of the investment process" and remained there until 1974. He joined BNP Paribas from 1975 to 1976, working in the international financial operations division. In 1977, Edouard Carmignac moved to the Banque de la Société Financière Européenne, specializing in off-balance sheet financing in the energy and mining sector.

In 1984, he founded Pyramide Gestion, a fund management company, as a subsidiary of stockbroker Georges Hamant (Hamant & Cie). The following year, he was named chief executive of Hamant & Cie, the firm being subsequently renamed Hamant Carmignac.

In 1989, legal changes concerning the finance sector in France meant that individual stockbrokers were strongly incentivised to sell their firms to their banking clients. He left Hamant Carmignac that year to establish Carmignac together with Éric Helderlé, to take advantage of the fact that less than 10% of savings in France at that time were under independent fund management. Haman Carmignac was subsequently acquired by ING to become ING Bourse. At Carmignac, Edouard Carmignac managed all the funds his firm first offered at the time to French investors. The firm enjoyed its first successes in the 1990s due to its early focus on technology, commodities and emerging markets.

During the 2000s, Carmignac's assets under management increased significantly and exceeded €50 billion after the subprime crisis. He was one of the few fund managers to return positive results during the 2008 financial crisis and August 2011 stock markets fall.

In September 2018, Edouard Carmignac handed over the management of the Carmignac Investissement Fund to the firm's head of equities, David Older.

In January 2019, Edouard Carmignac stepped down from managing the firm's flagship fund, the Carmignac Patrimoine fund, and handed the fund's daily operations to the head of fixed income, Rose Ouahba, as well as David Older. Edouard Carmignac, as a member of the Strategic Investment Committee, retains his positions as chief investment officer (CIO), as well as chairman and CEO of Carmignac.

== Cultural engagement ==
=== Fondation Carmignac ===
In 2000, Edouard Carmignac created Fondation Carmignac to promote modern art. The Foundation opened its collection to the public in June 2018 at the Villa Carmignac on the Island of Porquerolles. It has been run by his son Charles Carmignac since January 2017. Artists collected include Max Ernst, Warhol, Basquiat, Roy Lichtenstein, John Baldessari, Alexander Calder, Maurizio Cattelan, Urs Fischer, Douglas Gordon, Keith Haring, Zhang Huan, Jeff Koons, Roy Lichtenstein, Shirin Neshat, and Ed Ruscha.

The Foundation also awards the annual Carmignac Photojournalism Award, which Edouard Carmignac created in 2009. The award is endowed with a grant of €50,000 and aims to support the independence of photojournalists by providing them with the means to carry out in-depth fieldwork for investigative photo reportages.In 2025 the last prize was awarded with the Carmignac Fondation focusing on building the Villa Carmignac on the island of Porquerolles.

=== Concerts ===
In 2012, Edouard Carmignac hosted a private Rolling Stones concert at the Théâtre Mogador in Paris. Open to 1600 people, attendees included employees, business associates, financial advisers and journalists. The financial press afterwards dubbed Carmignac the "rock financier". During the concert, Mick Jagger was quoted as "You're lucky! Monsieur Carmignac is very generous. I didn't know him, but the queen told me great things about him." The concert's costs were never publicized but raised eyebrows as the event came amid political calls for austerity. Following the concert, Edouard Carmignac was named "European Personality of the Year 2012" by Funds Europe magazine. Other exclusive concerts organized by Carmignac include ones with Rod Stewart, Lou Reed, Ana Carolina, Neil Young, Simply Red, The Last Dinner Party, Nile Rodgers and CHIC.

== Public persona ==
Edouard Carmignac is known for his outspokenness and candid commentary on political affairs. Upon Jean-Claude Trichet's departure as president of the European Central Bank in 2011, the French media published an open letter by Carmignac in which he blamed Trichet for having aggravated the 2008 financial crisis and having put the Euro at risk through reckless rate hikes.

Shortly after the election of François Hollande as French president, Carmignac criticized the proposed tax hikes, instead encouraging the President to implement structural political and economic reforms in an open letter published in the Financial Times. It was picked up by several French dailies, including Le Monde.

In 2025, Edouard Carmignac spoke about the power of AI to transform economies and businesses stating we are “entering an era of unprecedented change.” He claims Europe risks “lagging far behind” and must react quickly to help ensure the preservation of European sovereignty.

== Personal life and family ==
=== Children ===
Édouard Carmignac is the father of five children, three sons and two daughters.

His son Charles Carmignac was the lead guitar of the Franco-American music group Moriarty, founded in 1995. He has also been the director of Fondation Carmignac since 2017and joined the board of the asset management company as a non-executive director in 2025.

His daughter Maxime is the only sibling working in the family owned asset management company. Following employment with Morgan Stanley, Lazard Frères and McKinsey, she joined Carmignac in 2006 as a fund manager, before leaving in 2008 to work for a hedge fund in New York. Since 2013, she is managing director of Carmignac's London office. She is considered to be the primary candidate to eventually succeed Edouard Carmignac.

His second daughter, Lucrèce, is a theater and film actress.

Hugues Carmignac is the founder of two start-ups.

=== Hobbies and interests ===
Carmignac plays polo as captain of the "Talandracas" team, along with his son Hugues. With Talandracas, Carmignac won the Deauville gold cup in 2002, 2004, 2010, 2013, 2016 and 2019, as well as the Queen's Cup in England in 2011 and 2024.

Carmignac has described himself as a "compulsive" art collector. His first acquisition was a lithograph by Max Ernst, portraying a scene from Alice in Wonderland. He has acquired paintings by Basquiat, Roy Lichtenstein and Gerhard Richter, among others. Two paintings of Lenin and Mao by Andy Warhol are in his office.

American painter Jean-Michel Basquiat painted Carmignac in 1984, with "a small C in a circle at the bottom" of the portrait becoming the inspiration for Carmignac's corporate logo.

=== Net worth ===
As of 2020, he is ranked 1990th on Forbes' list of billionaires with an estimated net worth of $1 billion.
