= Robert Fraisse =

Robert Fraisse may refer to:

- Robert Fraisse (cinematographer) (born 1940), French cinematographer
- Robert Fraisse (fencer) (1934–2022), French Olympic fencer
