= Eurofins Scientific =

French laboratory group

Eurofins Scientific SE
- Type: Public (Societas Europaea)
- Traded as: Euronext Paris: ERF; CAC 40 component
- Industry: Testing and Laboratory analysis
- Founded: 1987; 39 years ago
- Founder: Gilles Martin
- Headquarters: Luxembourg City, Luxembourg
- Key people: Gilles Martin (chairman & CEO)
- Revenue: €6.951 billion (2024)
- Operating income: 529,900,000 euro (2023)
- Net income: 310,200,000 euro (2023)
- Number of employees: ca. 63,000 (2024)
- Website: www.eurofins.com

Eurofins Scientific SE is a French group of laboratories headquartered in Luxembourg, providing testing and support services to the pharmaceutical, food, environmental, agriscience and consumer products industries and to governments.

Eurofins Group has an international network of over 900 laboratories in 62 countries and a portfolio of over 200,000 validated analytical methods for characterizing the safety, identity, purity, composition, authenticity and origin of products and biological substances. Eurofins also provides clinical diagnostic testing services and in-vitro diagnostic products.

== History ==
Eurofins Scientific was founded in 1987 with 4 employees. Eurofins derived the "fins" of its name from the French version of SNIF-NMR: Fractionnement Isotopique Naturel Spécifique par Résonance Magnétique Nucléaire or FINS-RMN. During this start up period (1987 to 1997), the SNIF-NMR patent was registered.

From 1997, Eurofins pursued growth through acquisitions of laboratories with specialized technologies and scientific expertise. As Eurofins' revenues reached €7 million, its IPO on the Paris Stock Exchange helped fund the organization's rapid geographic expansion. The network expanded to eight new countries and grew to include over 50 laboratory sites. The company expanded into food testing, biopharmaceutical product testing, environmental testing, genomics and contaminant testing.

In 2001, Eurofins developed Eurofins TAG, a system that uses genetic markers to trace meat products to individual animals to ensure consumer products are free of BSE.

From 2002, Eurofins started developing its infrastructure. It structured its laboratories as independent, entrepreneur-led companies, which eventually achieved global leadership positions in several key areas.

Eurofins completed close to 60 acquisitions in 2017 and close to 50 acquisitions in 2018, and became a €4 billion company.

In September 2021, Eurofins announced that Eurofins Scientific would be included in the CAC 40 Index.

== Key developments ==
On 1 July 2014, Eurofins purchased Viracor-IBT Laboratories from Ampersand Capital Partners for $255 million. The company is now known as Eurofins Viracor.

In May 2015, Eurofins acquired QC Laboratories in the USA and Experchems in Canada as part of its North American expansion strategy.

In June 2015, Eurofins announced the acquisition of Biomnis in France for €220 million. In September 2017, Eurofins Scientific acquired EAG Laboratories (Evans Analytical Group), a scientific services company that serves technology and life-science-related industries. On 5 March 2018, the Pennsylvania Department of Environmental Protection announced to collect a $600,000 penalty from Eurofins QC, LLC (Eurofins QC in Montgomery County, Pennsylvania) for falsifying whole effluent toxicity test (WETT) results.

Eurofins purchased Nanolab Technologies Inc, a service laboratory for the Silicon Valley industry, on 2 August 2018.

Eurofins acquired MET Labs on 11 January 2018, which enabled the network to have a Nationally Recognized Testing Laboratory as established by OHSA. At the end of 2018, a deal was finalized between Eurofins and the JSTI Group for the acquisition of TestAmerica Environmental Services, LLC, adding 24 laboratories and 40 service centers to the Eurofins environmental testing network.

On 3 June 2019, Eurofins reported that some of its IT systems were infected with ransomware and many servers and systems were taken offline. Eurofins paid the ransom after heavy disruption to their services. Court hearings were postponed as the forensics division was unable to take new samples.

Eurofins acquired Japanese genetics analysis company GeneTech, a leader in the specialist field of non-invasive pre-natal testing in August 2020.

In September 2020, Eurofins announced the acquisition of SunDream Group in Taiwan, which specialises in environmental analyses. The acquisition allowed Eurofins to become the leading player in the environmental analyst market in the country.

In February 2021, Eurofins acquired Beacon Discovery, a California-based company specialising in drug research. The group focuses on “G protein coupled receptors,” a major class of proteins in human cells, on which many molecules can act.

Eurofins announced the acquisition of the American DNA Diagnostics Centers, a group specializing in genetic testing, in June 2021.

In September 2022, Eurofins launched Eurofins Sustainability Solutions.

In August 2024, Eurofins acquired Orchid Cellmark a UK based DNA and forensic testing company.

In September 2024, Eurofins acquired Infinity Laboratories, Inc., based in Castle Rock, Colorado. This increased Eurofins' biopharmaceutical and medical device network in the USA.

On October 28, 2024, the French Eurofins buys the clinical analysis division of Synlab in Spain.

In early August 2025, a hack of the Dutch Clinical Diagnostics NMDL lab in Rijswijk, one of the companies purchased in 2018 was reported. During the hack sensitive personal data was stolen, including medical and address details as well as national identification numbers of 485,000 participants of the national early cervical cancer screening program. The laboratory reportedly paid the hacker group Nova after personal details of 53,000 people, including those of a Dutch cabinet minister and member of parliament were published on the dark web.

== Product authentication ==
Eurofins has developed proprietary analytical methods for food and product authentication aimed at detecting counterfeiting in food goods and cigars, as well as identifying food contaminants

== See also ==
- Assay
- Site-Specific Natural Isotope Fractionation-Nuclear Magnetic Resonance (SNIF-NMR) – used by Eurofins for the analysis of wines and other alcoholic beverages
