= GiFi =

French discount store

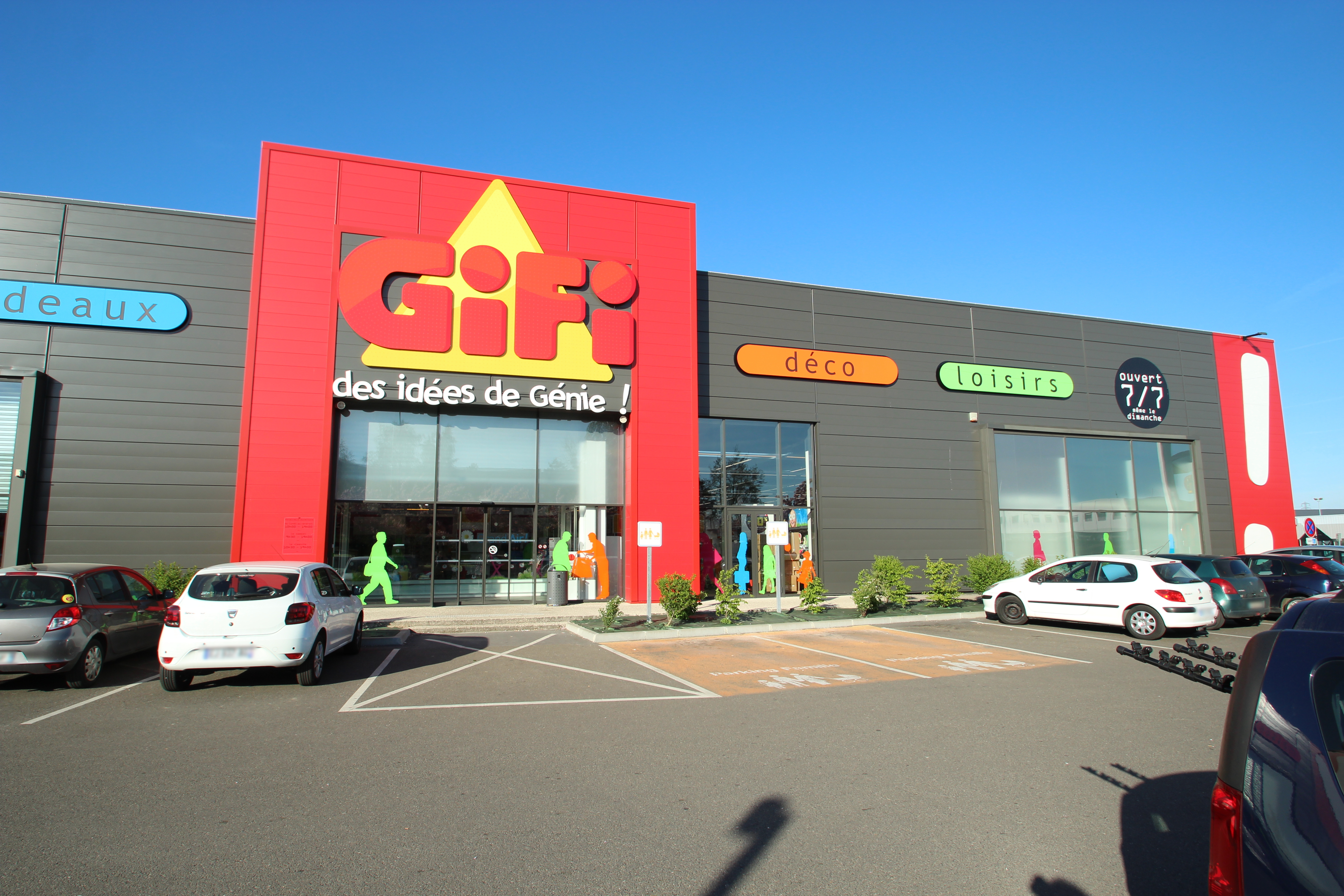
GiFi, Coignières, 2017

GiFi (phonetic abbreviation of its founder's name, Ginestet Philippe) is a French discount store chain with nearly 500 stores, mostly in France.

== History ==
It was founded in 1981 by Philippe Ginestet, who is the owner and chairman. His son Alexandre is the CEO.

In 1986, GiFi had nine stores in southwestern France and shifted from discount retail to a low-price model. In 1988, it established a purchasing center and began sourcing from Asia.

In 2017, GiFi bought French discount chain Tati.

In December 2025, the chain announced the closure of its 32 stores in Switzerland, with 14 set to be taken over by the rival group Maxi Bazar.
