= Philippe Ginestet =

French billionaire and businessman

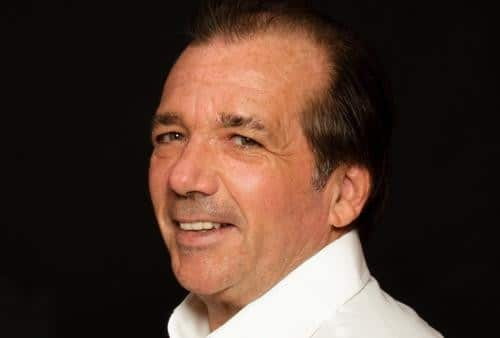
- Ginestet in 2017
- Born: 15 April 1954 (age 72); Sainte-Livrade-sur-Lot, Lot-et-Garonne, France
- Occupation: Businessman
- Known for: Founder and owner of GiFi

Philippe Ginestet (born 15 April 1954) is a French billionaire businessman, and the founder, chairman and owner of GiFi, a French discount chain.

== Early life and career ==
Philippe Ginestet was born on 15 April 1954 in Sainte-Livrade-sur-Lot, Lot-et-Garonne, France. Ginestet is one of the wealthiest persons in France and one of the largest clothing retailers.

Ginestet founded GiFi, a French discount chain in 1981. Groupe Philippe Ginestet (GPG) has over 700 stores in France and Belgium. His son Alexandre Ginestet is the CEO.

== Personal life ==
Ginestet lives in Pujols, Lot-et-Garonne, France.
