= The World's Billionaires 2012 =

Ranking of world billionaires by Forbes

The World's Billionaires 2012 edition was 26th annual ranking of The World's Billionaires by Forbes magazine. The list estimated the net worth of the world's richest people, excluding royalty and dictators, as of February 14, 2012. It was released online on March 7, 2012.

== Annual list ==
Telecommunications mogul Carlos Slim topped the 2012 list, marking this third consecutive year at the top. Microsoft founder Bill Gates placed second, but narrowed the gap from 2011 as Slim's fortune fell $5 billion while Gates' rose $5 billion. Investor Warren Buffett remained in third place. Bernard Arnault of France was the top-ranking European on the list, placing fourth. Amancio Ortega moved up a spot to number five, despite stepping down from Zara's top post during the year. Ricardo Salinas Pliego was the greatest gainer in terms of dollars, adding $9.2 billion to his fortune and moving up to number 37 overall. Facebook's Mark Zuckerberg was also among the top gainers, adding $4 billion to his fortune. Dustin Moskovitz, also of Facebook, was the youngest self-made billionaire on the list at age 27. Making her debut on the list at age 41, Spanx founder Sara Blakely became the youngest self-made female billionaire ever. Colombia's Alejandro Santo Domingo was the highest ranked newcomer, inheriting a $9.5 billion stake in Santo Domingo Group from his father. Laurene Powell Jobs, widow of Steve Jobs, was just behind Domingo, inheriting a fortune of $9 billion.

India's Lakshmi Mittal was the largest loser as his fortune dropped from $31.1 billion to $20.7 billion as the price of steel maker ArcelorMittal fell sharply. As a result, he failed to make the top 10 for the first time since 2004 and lost his title of richest Asian. Hong Kong's Li Ka-shing reclaimed that title, despite a slight drop in his own wealth. Harry Potter author JK Rowling and former Research In Motion CEO Jim Balsillie were among whose who fell off the list.

A record 1,226 people made the 2012 list, representing 58 countries. Of those, 126 were newcomers to the list and 104 were women. The United States had the greatest number of billionaires with 425. Russia had 96 people on the list, while China had 95. Three new billionaires from Morocco represented their nation, which did not have any billionaire in 2011. Georgia and Peru also were newly represented. Moscow was the home to the most billionaire with 78, followed by New York City with 58, and London with 39. Falling stock prices in Asia contributed to 117 former billionaires falling from the list worldwide. Twelve others listed in 2011 died.

The combined net worth of the billionaire list rose to a record $4.6 trillion. However, net gainers (460) barely outnumbered net losers (441, including 7 of the top 20). The list average was a net worth of $3.7 billion.

To coincide with the release of the 2012 list, Forbes announced a new "Billionaire Real-Time Ticker" updating the wealth of the world's top fifty billionaires in real time.

== Top 10 ==
Legend
Icon	Description
Steady	Has not changed from the previous year's list
▲	Has increased from the previous year's list
▼	Has decreased from the previous year's list

No.	Name	Net worth (USD)	Age	Citizenship	Source(s) Of Wealth
1	Carlos Slim & family	$69.0 billion ▼	72	Mexico	Telmex, América Móvil, Grupo Carso
2	Bill Gates	$61.0 billion ▲	56	United States	Microsoft
3	Warren Buffett	$44.0 billion ▼	81	United States	Berkshire Hathaway
4	Bernard Arnault	$41.0 billion ▲	63	France	LVMH Moët Hennessy • Louis Vuitton
5 ▲	Amancio Ortega	$37.5 billion ▲	75	Spain	Inditex Group
6 ▼	Larry Ellison	$36.0 billion ▲	67	United States	Oracle Corporation
7 ▲	Eike Batista	$30.0 billion ▲	55	Brazil	EBX Group
8 ▲	Stefan Persson	$26.0 billion ▲	64	Sweden	H&M
9 ▲	Li Ka-shing	$25.5 billion ▲	83	Hong Kong/Canada	Cheung Kong Holdings
10 ▲	Karl Albrecht	$25.4 billion ▲	92	Germany	Aldi Süd

== Top 100 ==
No.	Name	Net Worth USD billion	Age	Nationality	Source(s) of wealth
1	Carlos Slim Helu & family	69,0	72	Mexico	telecom
2	Bill Gates	61,0	56	United States	Microsoft
3	Warren Buffett	44,0	81	United States	Berkshire Hathaway
4	Bernard Arnault	41,0	63	France	LVMH
5	Amancio Ortega	37.5	75	Spain	Zara
6	Larry Ellison	36,0	67	United States	Oracle
7	Eike Batista	30,0	55	Brazil	mining, oil
8	Stefan Persson	26,0	64	Sweden	H&M
9	Li Ka-shing	25.5	83	Hong Kong	diversified
10	Karl Albrecht	25.4	92	Germany	Aldi Süd
11	Christy Walton & family	25.3	63	United States	Wal-Mart
12	Charles Koch	25,0	76	United States	diversified
12	David Koch	25,0	71	United States	diversified
14	Sheldon Adelson	24.9	78	United States	casinos
15	Liliane Bettencourt	24,0	89	France	L'Oreal
16	Jim Walton	23.7	64	United States	Wal-Mart
17	Alice Walton	23.3	62	United States	Wal-Mart
18	S. Robson Walton	23.1	68	United States	Wal-Mart
19	Mukesh Ambani	22.3	54	India	petrochemicals, oil & gas
20	Michael Bloomberg	22,0	70	United States	Bloomberg LP
21	Lakshmi Mittal	20.7	61	India	steel
22	George Soros	20,0	81	United States	hedge funds
23	Michele Ferrero & family	19,0	85	Italy	chocolates
24	Sergey Brin	18.7	38	United States	Google
24	Larry Page	18.7	39	United States	Google
26	Jeff Bezos	18.4	48	United States	Amazon.com
27	Thomas & Raymond Kwok & family	18.3	N/A	Hong Kong	real estate
28	Alisher Usmanov	18.1	58	Russia	steel, telecom, investments
29	Prince Alwaleed Bin Talal Alsaud	18,0	57	Saudi Arabia	investments
29	Lee Shau Kee	18,0	84	Hong Kong	diversified
29	Georgina Rinehart	18,0	58	Australia	Mining
32	Berthold & Theo Jr. Albrecht	17.8	N/A	Germany	Aldi Nord, Trader Joe's
32	Iris Fontbona & family	17.8	69	Chile	mining
34	Michael Otto & family	17.6	68	Germany	retail, real estate
35	David Thomson & family	17.5	54	Canada	media
35	Mark Zuckerberg	17.5	27	United States	Facebook
37	Ricardo Salinas Pliego & family	17.4	56	Mexico	retail, media
38	Alberto Bailleres Gonzalez & family	16.5	80	Mexico	mining
39	Rinat Akhmetov	16,0	45	Ukraine	steel, coal
39	Cheng Yu-tung	16,0	86	Hong Kong	diversified
41	Michael Dell	15.9	47	United States	Dell
41	Vladimir Lisin	15.9	55	Russia	steel, transport
41	Azim Premji	15.9	66	India	software
44	Steve Ballmer	15.7	56	United States	Microsoft
45	Alexei Mordashov	15.3	46	Russia	steel, investments
46	Vladimir Potanin	14.5	51	Russia	metals
47	Phil Knight	14.4	74	United States	Nike
48	Paul Allen	14.2	59	United States	Microsoft, investments
48	German Larrea Mota Velasco & family	14.2	58	Mexico	mining
50	Carl Icahn	14,0	76	United States	leveraged buyouts
50	Birgit Rausing & family	14,0	88	Sweden	packaging
52	Forrest Mars Jr	13.8	80	United States	candy
52	Jacqueline Mars	13.8	72	United States	candy
52	John Mars	13.8	75	United States	candy
52	Joseph Safra	13.8	73	Brazil	banking
56	Vagit Alekperov	13.5	61	Russia	Lukoil
57	Mikhail Fridman	13.4	47	Russia	oil, banking, telecom
58	Mikhail Prokhorov	13.2	46	Russia	investments
59	Susanne Klatten	13,0	49	Germany	BMW, pharmaceuticals
59	Francois Pinault & family	13,0	75	France	retail
61	Mohammed Al Amoudi	12.5	67	Saudi Arabia	oil, diversified
61	Anne Cox Chambers	12.5	92	United States	media
61	John Paulson	12.5	56	United States	hedge funds
64	Robert Kuok	12.4	88	Malaysia	diversified
64	Luis Carlos Sarmiento	12.4	79	Colombia	banking
64	Viktor Vekselberg	12.4	54	Russia	oil, metals
67	Antonio Ermirio de Moraes & family	12.2	83	Brazil	diversified
68	Roman Abramovich	12.1	45	Russia	steel, investments
69	Donald Bren	12,0	79	United States	real estate
69	Jorge Paulo Lemann	12,0	72	Brazil	beer
69	Ronald Perelman	12,0	69	United States	leveraged buyouts
72	Len Blavatnik	11.9	54	United States	diversified
72	Leonid Mikhelson	11.9	56	Russia	gas, chemicals
74	Leonardo Del Vecchio	11.5	76	Italy	eyewear
75	John Fredriksen	11.3	67	Cyprus	shipping
76	Aliko Dangote	11.2	54	Nigeria	sugar, flour, cement
76	Stefan Quandt	11.2	45	Germany	BMW
78	Gerald Cavendish Grosvenor & family	11,0	60	United Kingdom	real estate
78	Harold Hamm	11,0	66	United States	oil & gas
80	Savitri Jindal & family	10.9	62	India	steel
81	Andrey Melnichenko	10.8	40	Russia	coal, fertilizers
82	James Simons	10.7	73	United States	hedge funds
83	Ernesto Bertarelli & family	10.6	46	Switzerland	biotech, investments
84	Jack Taylor & family	10.4	89	United States	Enterprise Rent-A-Car
85	Abigail Johnson	10.3	50	United States	Fidelity
86	Robin Li	10.2	43	China	Technology
86	Eliodoro, Bernardo & Patricia Matte	10.2	N/A	Chile	paper
88	Ray Dalio	10,0	62	United States	hedge funds
88	George Kaiser	10,0	69	United States	oil & gas, banking
88	Johanna Quandt	10,0	85	Germany	BMW
88	Hans Rausing	10,0	86	Sweden	packaging
88	Tadashi Yanai & family	10,0	63	Japan	retail
93	Serge Dassault & family	9.9	86	France	aviation
93	Ananda Krishnan	9.9	73	Malaysia	telecoms
95	Klaus-Michael Kuhne	9.8	74	Germany	shipping
96	Pallonji Mistry	9.7	82	Ireland	construction
97	Alejandro Santo Domingo Davila	9.5	35	Colombia	beer
98	Horst Paulmann & family	9.3	77	Chile	retail
99	Gennady Timchenko	9.1	59	Russia	oil & gas
100	Laurene Powell Jobs & family	9,0	48	United States	Apple, Disney
100	David & Simon Reuben	9,0	69	United Kingdom	investments, real estate
100	Dmitry Rybolovlev	9,0	45	Russia	fertilizer
100	Harold Simmons	9,0	80	United States	investments

== See also ==
- List of wealthiest families
