= Fareva =

French pharmaceutical company

- Company type: Private
- Founded: 1985
- Headquarters: Tournon-sur-Rhône, France
- Key people: Bernard Fraisse, chairman, founder and 100% owner
- Operating income: €1.6 billion (2018)
- Number of employees: 12,500

Fareva is a French pharmaceutical company, with annual revenues of $1.6 billion in 2018, founded and 100% owned by Bernard Fraisse, a French billionaire businessman.

== History ==
Founded in 1985, the company now employs 12,500 people. Fareva is the largest contract manufacturing organization (CMO) in France, and of the top five pharmaceutical contract manufacturing organizations in the world. It has over 12,500 employees working in 40 different production sites.

In 2020 the company acquired two biologics facilities from Pierre Fabre; an oncology injectable plant in Pau, Southwest France and a monoclonal antibody (mAb) production facility in Saint-Julien-en-Genevois on the French-Swiss border.

The company is headquartered in Tournon-sur-Rhône, Ardèche, France.
