= Carmignac =

French asset management firm

- Founded: 1989; 37 years ago
- Founder: Édouard Carmignac (Founder, Chairman and CIO); Éric Helderlé (Founder, Managing Director Carmignac Luxembourg)
- Headquarters: 24, Place Vendôme, Paris, France
- Key people: Frédéric Leroux (Head of Cross Asset) Maxime Carmignac, (CEO, Carmignac UK) Rose Ouahba (Managing Director) Christophe Peronin (Managing Director)
- Products: Asset Management
- Total assets: $44 billion (2021)
- Number of employees: 294
- Website: www.carmignac.com

Carmignac is a French asset management firm founded in 1989 by Édouard Carmignac and Éric Helderlé. The firm is wholly employee-owned and as of 2025 had $40.9 billion of assets under management.

== History ==
=== Foundation and early year ===
After its founding in 1989 in Paris, the firm opened its first office abroad in Luxembourg in 1999. In 2008, offices were established in Madrid and Milan, followed by London in 2012 and Zurich in 2015.

In 2000, Carmignac’s assets amounted to €1 billion, reaching €13 billion in 2007.

The firm’s flagship fund, Carmignac Patrimoine, was not affected by the 2008 financial crisis, which led to an increase in assets in the following years, and it became one of the largest funds in Europe for a while, according to the Financial Times.

=== 2018 - Present ===
In September 2018, it was announced that Édouard Carmignac would step down from running the Carmignac Investissement Fund, management of which passed to David Older.

Edouard Carmignac announced in January 2019 that he would step down as the portfolio manager of the Carmignac Patrimoine fund after holding this position for 30 years. Rose Ouahba and David Older succeeded Carmignac as dual leads of the Fund. However, Edouard Carmignac maintained his role as a member of the strategic investment committee and chief investment officer (CIO).

In June 2019, the company agreed to pay a €30 million as part of a settlement under a public interest judicial agreement against the discontinuation of proceedings by the National Financial Prosecutor's Office.

In 2023, a new management team was appointed to run Carmignac Patrimoine. In 2024, Kristofer Barrett was appointed to replace David Older on Carmignac Patrimoine and Carmignac Investissement. Carmignac Portfolio Family Governed closed in 2024.

== Funds managed ==
As of 2026, Carmignac managed 26 investment strategies. These activities include, among others, equity and fixed income management.

In May 2019, it was announced that Carmignac launched six new OEICs funds in the United Kingdom in a push to increase its European presence beyond the French market. The funds are similar to those the firm is already managing in France. In April 2019, Marie-Anne Allier took over the co-management of Carmignac Sécurité Fond. In the same year, three of the company's funds were certified with the French SRI label for sustainable investment vehicles.

The firm launched two more funds in June that year, called the Carmignac Portfolio Grandchildren fund and the Carmignac Portfolio Family Governed fund. These aim to provide financial security to children.

In 2024, Carmignac opened its first private equity strategy. It also launched Carmignac Portfolio Tech Solutions in 2024. Naomi Waistell joined the business to co-manage Carmignac’s emerging market strategy in 2025.
