= Henri Beaufour =

French businessman (1965–2025)

- Born: Henri Pierre Albert Marie Beaufour; 6 January 1965; Neuilly-sur-Seine, France
- Died: 28 November 2025 (aged 60)
- Education: Georgetown University
- Occupation: Businessman
- Board member of: Ipsen
- Parent: Albert Beaufour
- Relatives: Anne Beaufour (sister)

Henri Beaufour (6 January 1965 – 28 November 2025) was a French billionaire businessman. He was a descendant of Henri Beaufour, founder of the Beaufour laboratories, forerunner of the French biopharmaceutical company Ipsen.

== Biography ==
Born on 6 January 1965, in Neuilly-sur-Seine, Henri Beaufour was the son of Albert Beaufour, who died in 2000, and the grandson of Dr. Henri Beaufour, founder of the Ipsen group.

He earned a Bachelor of Arts degree from Georgetown University, Washington, D.C.

When Albert Beaufour died in 2000, the 76% of the capital held by the family was divided between the three brothers and sisters. One of the daughters, Véronique Beaufour, sold her share, representing 6% of the capital. Anne and her brother Henri Beaufour thus control 57% of the Ipsen group, and both sit on the board of directors of Ipsen and Mayroy, the Ipsen controlling holding company. Their share in Ipsen was still 52% in 2020.

In 2018, his fortune was estimated at €3 billion.

Beaufour died on 28 November 2025.
