= Bernard Fraisse =

French businessman (born August 1956)

Bernard Robert Louis Fraisse
- Born: Bernard Fraisse; August 1956 (age 69)
- Known for: Founder and owner of 100% of Fareva
- Title: Chairman, Fareva

Bernard Robert Louis Fraisse (born August 1956) is a French billionaire businessman, the chairman, founder and 100% owner of Fareva, a French pharmaceutical company, with annual revenues of $1.4 billion in 2015.

== Early life ==
Fraisse has a degree in mechanical engineering.

== Career ==
Fraisse founded Fareva in 1985, and the company employs 9,500 people in 2018. Fareva is the largest contract manufacturing organization (CMO) in France.

== Personal life ==
Fraisse lives in Paris.
