= Altarea SCA =

French real estate development company

Altarea
- Type: Société en commandite par actions
- Traded as: Euronext: ALTA; CAC Small
- Founded: 1994
- Founder: Alain Taravella and Jacques Nicolet
- Headquarters: Paris, France
- Area served: Europe
- Key people: Alain Taravella (chairman)
- Revenue: €1,940 million (2017)
- Total assets: €4.7 billion (2017), residential reservations: 11,119 units (2017), retail pipelines: €3.4 billion (2017), and office pipeline: 51 projects
- Number of employees: 1742
- Website: AltareaCogedim.com

Altarea SCA (trading as Altarea) is a French company dedicated to the development and investment in real estate, especially shopping centers. Its headquarters are located in France, with subsidiaries in Spain and Italy. It was founded in 1994.

== History ==
=== Creation and development of the group ===
The company was founded in 1994 by Alain Taravella and Jacques Nicolet, and was initially engaged in the development of shopping malls. During the following years, it acquired several smaller firms in the French property sector: in 1995, Altarea acquired Le Gerec, a company created in 1973, specializing in shopping center construction. It won a competition organized by the town of Le Havre for the construction of Espace Coty.

In 1997, the firm began construction on the Bercy Village shopping center in the 12th arrondissement of Paris, which opened in 2000. The project aimed to revive a historic neighborhood of Paris. In 2001, the Italian subsidiary, Altarea Italia, was established. The Group opened several shopping centers in 2002: Espace Jaurès in Brest, Espace Grand’Rue in Roubaix, Côté Seine in Argenteuil, and the Gare du Nord boutiques in Paris. At the same time, it launched its open-air retail park activity by creating Compagnie Retail Park, a subsidiary in charge of this sector. The Group gradually developed its business activity in the European Union. It extended its activity to Italy in 2001 by creating Altarea Italia., and in 2004, Altarea España was created in Spain. Today, it features a major shopping center located in Sant-Cugat, near Barcelona. In 2011, Altarea supplemented its various business activities by creating AltaFund, an investment fund dedicated to office property.

=== Acquisitions ===
In 2007, Altarea purchased Cogedim. Founded in 1963, Codegim's main activities included the development of housing, offices and hotels. In addition to housing in major French metropolitan areas, the Group also developed its activity in upmarket commercial real estate and luxury hotels, with the renovation of the Salle Wagram in 2009, the opening of the Marriott Renaissance Arc de Triomphe, the Radisson Blu in Nantes in 2012, and the InterContinental Hôtel Dieu in Marseille in 2013.

In 2007, the Group acquired 34% of SEMMARIS–a semi-public company that manages the Rungis International Market–by becoming the majority shareholder alongside the state. The Rungis International Market is the world’s largest wholesale food market in terms of volume.

=== Development of retail and e-commerce activity ===
Since 2011, Altarea Cogedim has developed its commercial activity, opening several shopping centers in France: Family Village in Limoges, the Okabé shopping centre and offices in Kremlin-Bicêtre, the acquisition of Cap 3000 in Saint-Laurent-du-Var, near Nice. In all, Altarea owns 41 shopping centers in France, Italy and Spain.

In 2012, it acquired a 96.5% interest in Rueducommerce, an e-commerce company operating the website rueducommerce.fr. In August 2015, loss-making Rue du Commerce was sold to the Carrefour Group.

In 2014, the QWARTZ regional connected shopping center was opened in Hauts-de-Seine (92). It received quality certification in 2014 a MAPIC Award for "Most Innovative Shopping Center and the Special Jury Prize at the ninth SIIC awards.

In 2014, Altarea Cogedim launched the renovation and extension of the Cap 3000 center d in Saint-Laurent du Var.

=== Growth of real estate activity ===
In 2012, Alain Taravella, president and founder of the Altarea Cogedim group, and Richard Hennessy, president of the Histoire & Patrimoine firm and a specialist in historic real estate, signed an agreement ceding 55% of the capital of Histoire & Patrimoine to Altarea Cogedim through a capital increase. In 2015, Altarea Cogedim announced its acquisition of Pitch Promotion, a transaction finalized in February 2016.

== Governance ==
Alain Taravella is Chairman and Founder The Supervisory Board is chaired by Christian de Gournay.

== Ownership and financial data ==
=== Ownership ===
According to the reports from the company, 46% percent of it is owned by Alain Taravella (on 31 December 2016), 8% by ABP funds, 27% CA Group, 18% by the public & others.

=== Financial results ===
In 2017, the Group’s total revenues increased 22.6% over the prior fiscal year, to €1,940 million Listed on compartment A of Euronext Paris, Altarea had a market capitalization of €3.3 billion on 31 December 2017.

== Relevant projects ==
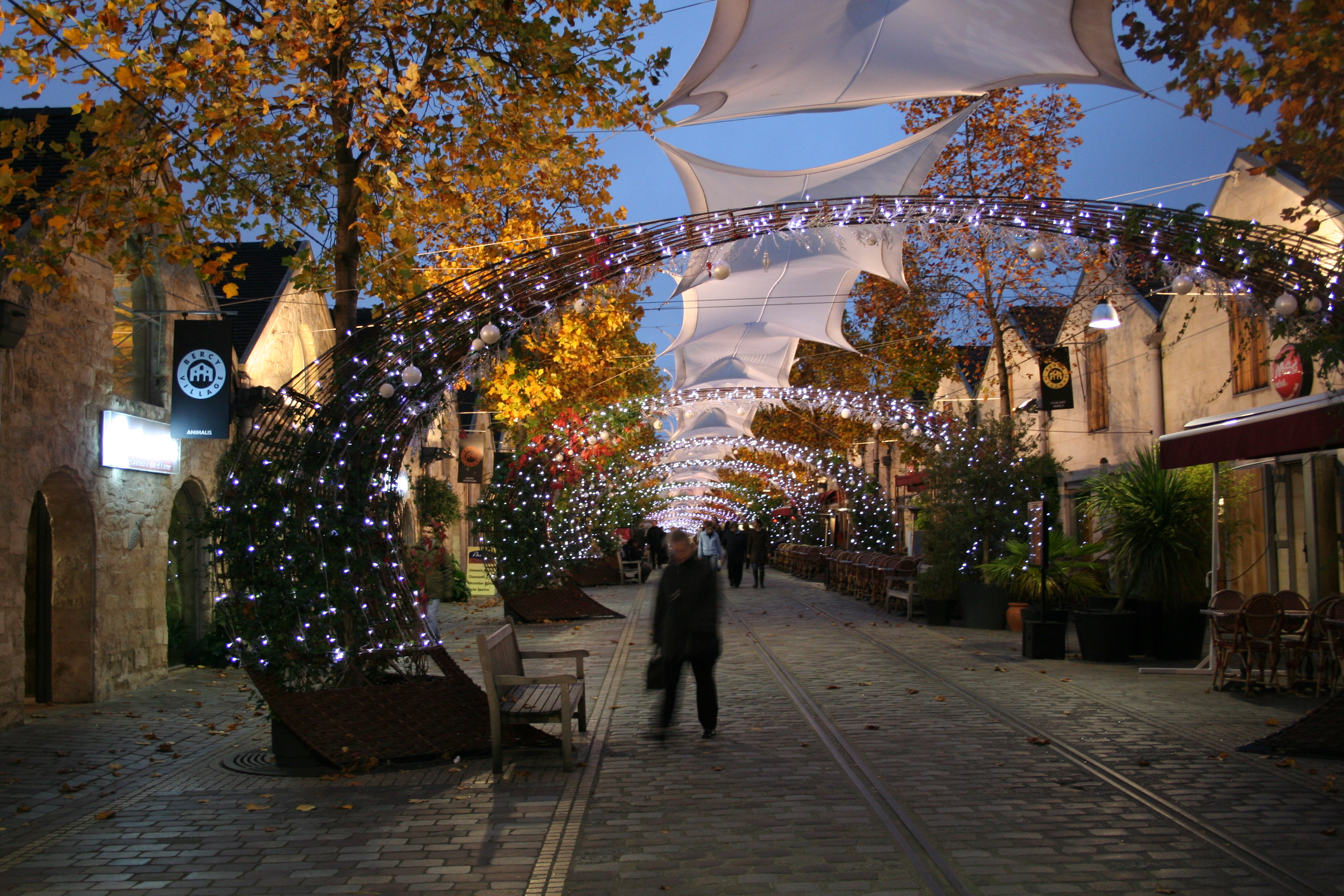
In 1997, Altarea began construction on the Bercy Village shopping center in the 12th arrondissement of Paris, which opened in 2000. Bercy Village, a non-standard shopping mall, was one of the first major projects of Altarea.

In the early 2000s, Altarea introduced the Family Village concept. It involves environmentally-friendly shopping malls with a distinctive architecture, designed for a clientele consisting of families and multiple age groups. The structure centers on parks and green areas. Bercy Village attracts 12 million visitors each year, 20% of whom are tourists.

In 2007, the group purchased from the French State a 33.34 percent stake in Semmaris, the company that manages the Rungis International Market, the biggest wholesale food market in the world.

On 23 February 2011, it was announced that Altarea Cogedim, together with CFC Développement, will build the new French headquarters of Mercedes-Benz at Montigny-le-Bretonneux, replacing the current system of three venues for the carmaker distributed throughout the country. Altarea constructed around 170,000 m^{2} of offices and hotels in 2011.

On 27 October 2011, a group subsidiary, Altacom, acquired a 24.13 percent stake in Rue du Commerce SA, one of France’s leading online retailers. On 26 January 2012, it announced the purchase of a 95.11 percent majority stake, taking control of the firm.

In 2012, the group won the contract for the Place du Grand Ouest project in Massy, a mixed-use development of 100,000 m² (1,076,000 square feet). This project represents the biggest construction site in Greater Paris, and as the sole operator the group plans to create around 900 dwellings, a 150-room hotel, a public parking lot with 550 spaces, a conference center including a 600-seater auditorium, a 12-screen cinema, a preschool and 8,000 m² (86,000 square feet) of local stores.

In 2015, the group acquired the LANDSCAPE building in the Paris-La Défense business district, through a joint venture between Goldman Sachs and AltaFund, an investment fund managed and sponsored by the group, The renovation will make up a building complex measuring around 70,000 m². It will offer its future occupants several eateries, services, a conference centre with a 200-seat auditorium and space that can potentially house

In 2016, the group was awarded contracts for several mixed-use developments in various cities, comprising housing, offices and businesses, including the construction of the Belvédère neighborhood in Bordeaux (140,000 m² [1,500,000 square feet] with business and conference centers), the conversion of the Blanchisserie Centrale site at Lyon’s Hospices Civils hospital (17,500 m² [188,000 square feet] in the heart of the city, to be completed in 2018) and a new project at the National Centre for Telecommunications Research in Issy-les-Moulineaux (100,000 m² designed around a 13,000-m² [140,000-square-foot] urban park with housing, offices, public amenities and a daycare center). The group was also chosen to be the sole operator of a city-center project of more than 100,000 m² in Bobigny.

In 2017, the group inaugurated the Greater Paris largest construction site, Massy Place du Grand Ouest. The mixed-use area of 100,000 m² (1,076,000 square feet) provides around 900 dwellings, a 150-room hotel, a public parking lot with 550 spaces, a conference center including a 600-seater auditorium, a 12-screen cinema, a preschool and 8,000 m² (86,000 square feet) of local stores . In 2017, The Group began to develop The Issy Coeur de Ville (92) project, a new eco-district of more than 100,000 m² based around a 13,000 m² landscaped park, that will provide offices, housing and shops.

In 2018, the group will construct a sustainable group of 2000 apartments at Neuilly sur Marne.

Altarea Cogedim & Credit Agricole Immobilier were entrusted with the Guillaumet site in Toulouse.
