= Anne Beaufour =

French billionaire heiress

- Born: Anne Gilberte Marie Beaufour; August 1963 (age 62); Neuilly-sur-Seine, France
- Education: University of Paris-Sud
- Occupation: Businesswoman
- Board member of: Ipsen
- Spouse: Michel Audibert
- Parent: Albert Beaufour
- Relatives: Henri Beaufour (brother)

Anne Beaufour (born 1963) is a French billionaire businesswoman. She is a descendant of Henri Beaufour, founder of the Beaufour laboratories, ancestor of the French biopharmaceutical company Ipsen.

== Biography ==
Born on August 8, 1963, in Neuilly-sur-Seine, Anne Beaufour is the daughter of Albert Beaufour, who died in 2000, and the granddaughter of Dr. Henri Beaufour, founder of the Ipsen group.

She holds a degree in geology from the University of Paris-Sud. She married Michel Audibert in 1999.

When Albert Beaufour died in 2000, the 76% of the capital held by the family was divided between the three brothers and sisters. One of the daughters, Véronique Beaufour, sold her share, representing 6% of the capital. Anne and her brother Henri Beaufour thus control 57% of the Ipsen group, and both sit on the Board of Directors of Ipsen and Mayroy, the Ipsen controlling holding company. Their share in Ipsen is still 52% in 2020.

In 2020, her fortune is estimated between 2 and 3.2 billion euros by Forbes, Challenges and Capital, which makes her the 1990th fortune in the world according to Forbes and one of the most important French fortunes^{,}.
