= Thebaud =

Thebaud may refer to:

== People with the surname ==
- Augustus Thébaud (1807–1885), French-born American educator.
- Edward Thebaud (1798–1884), American merchant.
- Joseph Thebaud (1772–1811), American merchant.
- Leo Hewlett Thebaud (1890–1980), American military personnel.
- Léon Thébaud, French lawyer and ambassador.
- Louis A. Thebaud, (1859–1939), American sportsman, businessman, and philanthropist.
- Sacha Thébaud (1934–2004), Haitian artist.
- Thomas Thebaud, Dean of Wells between 1381 and 1389.

== Location ==
- Château-Thébaud, a town in France.

== Other ==
- Gertrude L. Thebaud, American racing schooner.
- Thebaud Brothers, commission house in New York City, USA.
- Thebaud, a natural gas field of the Sable Offshore Energy Project in Canada.
