= Dassault (surname) =

Dassault is a French surname.

== List of people with the surname ==
- Darius Paul Dassault (1882–1969), French general
- Laurent Dassault (born 1953), French billionaire businessman
- Madeleine Dassault (1901–1992), French industrialist
- Marcel Dassault (1892–1986), French engineer and industrialist
- Olivier Dassault (1951–2021), French politician and billionaire businessman
- Serge Dassault (1925–2018), French engineer, businessman and politician
- Thierry Dassault (born 1957), French billionaire businessman
- Victor Habert-Dassault (born 1992), French politician

== See also ==
- Dassault Group
