= Claude de Cambronne =

French businessman

- Born: 23 October 1905; Paris 16, France
- Died: 31 January 1993 (aged 87); Boulogne-Billancourt, France
- Resting place: Sylvains-les-Moulins
- Education: Supaéro
- Occupations: aircraft industrialist, French Resistance
- Known for: founding Bordeaux-Aéronautique
- Spouses: Andrée Guillain; Marie Picard-Destelan
- Children: 3

Claude de Cambronne (French pronunciation: [klod də kɑ̃bʁɔn]; 23 October 1905 – 31 January 1993) was a French businessman.

== Early life ==
He studied at the École nationale supérieure de l'aéronautique et de l'espace (Sup'Aéro), learnt how to fly to polar explorer, Paul-Émile Victor, in 1931, and became a journalist for the Journal de l'Aeronautique for which he reported details, in 1934, of the Dewoitine D.332 Emeraude crash, in which Maurice Noguès died, questioning the absence of parachutes on board. Being the treasurer of the Association des anciens élèves de Sup'Aéro and working for the Touring Club de France, he organized a lottery with the president of the association, Marcel Dassault, who offered an I41 tourism plane for the occasion.

== Career ==
After serving as a French Air Force captain, Cambronne became the general secretary of the SAAMB factory, in Saint-Cloud, from December 1938 to May 1940 and became the Association des anciens élèves de Sup'Aéro treasurer.

In 1939, Marcel Bloch, aircraft manufacturer, was recruiting workers. On February 1, Bloch hired Cambronne. He had some experience in aviation, and explained that "after Sup'Aéro, I worked, in an insurance company that only covered the tourism plane's risks. I was the expertise director. Marcel Bloch asked me to join his company saying : " I offer you a job in my company because we are going to have a war. " I was very astonished. Later, I understood that when he opened his mouth it was only to say meaningful things. With him, I went from the level of a Sup 'Aero student to the highest level the profession."

On 27 November 1940 Marcel Bloch gave him a letter, for the Association des anciens élèves de Sup'Aéro:

My dear comrades, if the time is difficult, do not despair of the future. (...) After this war where ships, rolling stock, commercial aircraft have been destroyed, the airline industry will experience an unprecedented boom as it will replace most means of transport. (...) "No doubt that the government of the French state in a rebuilt Europe will keep our country from aircraft production amounts to our technique and our geographical position in the world. (...) "President of your Association, I will return one day place me next to you, and my friendly competition will be as always granted. (Claude Carlier, Marcel Dassault : La légende d'un siècle, Éditions Perrin, mai 2002, p. 129)

On 18 April 1941 Claude de Cambronne asked Christian du Jonchay, future founder of the Légion impériale, to write to André de Gorostarzu, member of the cabinet of Philippe Pétain, in vain.

On 19 May he became the representative in Zone libre of the Bordeaux-Aéronautique company. but after permanent and then intermittent and clandestine communication with Marcel Bloch during his four-year imprisonment, Cambronne is considered "enjuivé" by the Abwehr at the Hotel Majestic and denounced as Gaullist to the Reichsleiter Rosenberg Taskforce. He resigned after the Bordeaux-Aéronautique company's dissolution, on 21 May 1947.

The Bloch MB. 1020's construction was stopped at the end of 1940 and the BA 30 realized by Bordeaux-Aéronautique became the Dassault MD 312 Flamant after certain modifications.

After the war, he worked for Cessna and Goodyear in Morocco. Member of the Aero Club de France, with more than 1,000 flying hours, he becomes Officer of Staff specialized 4e Bureau, in charge of transport and supplies. He died in Paris, at age 87.

== Awards ==
- Chevalier of the Légion d'honneur

== Personal life ==
His family came from Crépy-en-Valois, Cambronne-lès-Ribécourt and lived in the Château d'Orrouy. He is the natural son of Paul Cottin and the great-grandchild of Arnouph Deshayes de Cambronne. He had three children : a son, Gilles, with Andrée Guillain, daughter of the neurologist Georges Guillain and two daughters, Béatrice and Laurence de Cambronne, with Marie Picard-Destelan, descendant of the navy officer Ernest Picard-Destelan and an agent of the French East India Company, Joseph Thebaud.

== See also ==
- Dassault Aviation
- SNCASE SE.161 Languedoc
- Bloch MB.170

== Bibliography ==
- Marcel Dassault, Le Talisman (autobiographie), éd. J'ai Lu, 1970 et éd. Jours de France, 1973
- Jean-Yves Lorant, Le Focke-Wulf 190, Paris, avec Jean-Bernard Frappé, Editions Larivière, coll. « Docavia », 1981, 408 p.
- Pierre Assouline, Monsieur Dassault, Balland, 1983, ISBN 9782715804067
- Herrick Chapman, State Capitalism and Working-Class Radicalism in the French Aircraft Industry. Berkeley: University of California Press, 1991
- Claude d'Abzac-Epezy, L'Armée de l'air des années noires : Vichy 1940-1944, avec Général Maurice Schmitt, 1998
- Claude Carlier, Marcel Dassault la légende d'un siècle, Perrin, 2002
- Patrick Facon, La guerre aérienne, 1933-1945, 2003
- Guy Vadepied (avec la collaboration de Pierre Péan), Marcel Dassault ou les ailes du pouvoir, éd. Fayard, 2003
- Vincent Giraudier, Les bastilles de vichy, répression politique et internement administratif, Editions Taillandier, 2009 ISBN 978-2847344141
- Claude Carlier, Dassault, de Marcel à Serge, Cent ans d'une étonnante aventure humaine, industrielle et politique, Perrin, 2017
