= Serge Dassault =

French businessman and politician (1925–2018)

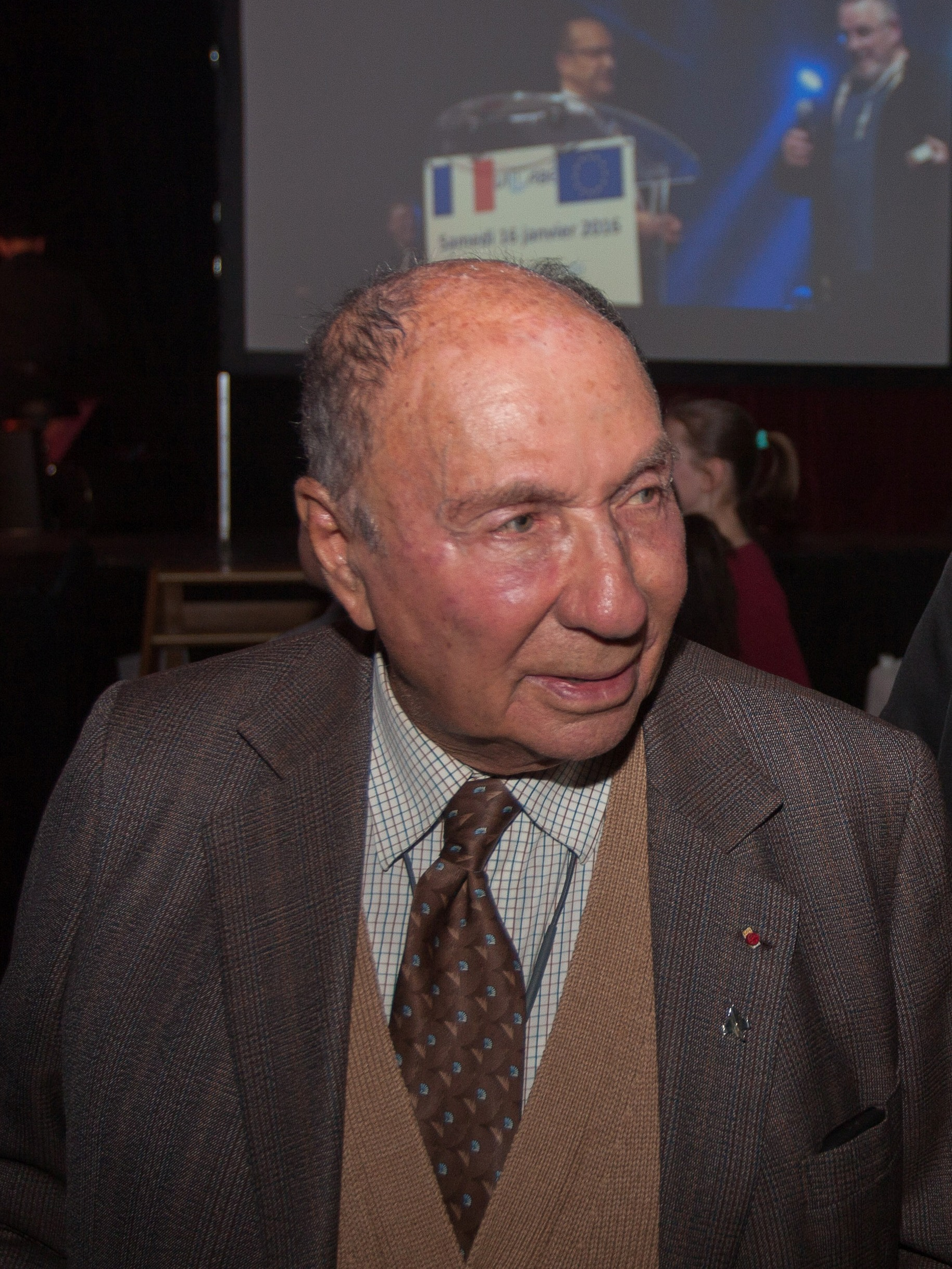
- Dassault in 2016

Member of the French Senate for Essonne
- In office 1 October 2004 – 1 October 2017
- Succeeded by: Laure Darcos

Mayor of Corbeil-Essonnes
- In office 1995–2009
- Preceded by: Marie-Anne Lesage
- Succeeded by: Jean-Pierre Bechter

Personal details
- Born: Serge Paul André Bloch; 4 April 1925 Paris, France
- Died: 28 May 2018 (aged 93) Paris, France
- Resting place: Passy Cemetery, Paris
- Spouse: Nicole Raffel (m. 1950)
- Children: Olivier Dassault; Laurent Dassault; Thierry Dassault; Marie-Hélène Dassault
- Parent(s): Marcel Dassault; Madeleine Minckès
- Relatives: Darius Paul Dassault (uncle)
- Education: Lycée Janson-de-Sailly; Lycée Saint-Louis
- Alma mater: École Polytechnique; SUPAERO; HEC Paris
- Occupation: Businessman

Serge Dassault (French: [sɛʁʒ daso]; born Serge Paul André Bloch; 4 April 1925 – 28 May 2018) was a French engineer, businessman and politician. He was the chairman and chief executive officer of Dassault Group, and a conservative politician. According to Forbes, Dassault's net worth was estimated in 2016 at US$15 billion.

== Early life and education ==
He was the younger son of Madeleine Dassault (née Minckès) and Marcel Dassault (born Marcel Ferdinand Bloch), from whom he inherited the Dassault Group. Both his parents were of Jewish heritage, but later converted to Roman Catholicism.

In 1929, his father founded what is now Dassault Aviation. During the Second World War, he was jailed when his father was sent to Buchenwald for refusing any cooperation from his company, Bordeaux-Aéronautique, directed by Henri Déplante, André Curvale and Claude de Cambronne, with the German aviation industry.

He studied at the Lycée Janson-de-Sailly in the 16th arrondissement of Paris where he received his baccalauréat. He earned engineering degrees from the École Polytechnique (class of 1946) and Supaéro (class of 1951). In 1963, he received an Executive MBA from HEC Paris.

== Business career ==
After his father's death in 1986, Serge Dassault continued developing the company, with the help of CEOs Charles Edelstenne and Éric Trappier. His group also owned the newspaper Le Figaro. In December 1998, he was sentenced to two years' probation in the Belgian Agusta scandal, and was fined 60,000 Belgian francs (about €1,500).

According to Forbes, the Dassault family also owns a winery, property in Paris, and an art auction house.

In the Industry

In 1951, after graduating from Sup'Aéro, he joined Générale aéronautique Marcel Dassault as an engineer in the serial aircraft design office.

In 1954, he worked as a test engineer on prototype development and was appointed director of flight testing a year later, overseeing trials for the Super Mystère, Étendard, Mirage III, and Mirage IV. In 1960, after transferring to the export division, he negotiated the sale of Mirage III jets to Australia and Switzerland. In 1962, he unveiled the Mystère 20—the first business jet in the Falcon family—at the National Business Aviation Association exhibition in Pittsburgh. By 1963, he was named deputy general director of Électronique Marcel Dassault, rising to chairman and CEO in 1967. The company was renamed Électronique Serge Dassault in 1982.

Following various leadership roles within the group, he became chairman and CEO of Dassault Industries (later renamed Groupe Dassault) in 1987 after his father's death. The succession was contentious, as Serge Dassault lacked his father's prestige and was not his preferred heir. Defense Minister André Giraud openly opposed the transition, seeking to restructure the group (then called Dassault-Breguet) to favor state control. Giraud instructed the six state-appointed board members (out of 12 total) to vote against Serge. However, to widespread surprise, Serge was elected chairman on October 29, 1986, via secret ballot after one state representative defied orders—reportedly swayed by President François Mitterrand, who had been persuaded by General Pierre de Bénouville (a close friend of Marcel Dassault and longtime ally of Mitterrand).

He vigorously lobbied to secure funding for the Rafale multirole fighter, whose development faced repeated government scrutiny. He even successfully campaigned for the French Navy to adopt the Rafale M over American F-18s for its new Charles de Gaulle aircraft carrier.

In 1995–1996, as the Rafale—whose prototype first flew in 1986—struggled to attract international buyers, Prime Minister Alain Juppé proposed merging Dassault with Aérospatiale and Britain's BAE. Serge Dassault, backed by employees, resisted the merger to protect the group's independence. The project collapsed after the right-wing's defeat in the 1997 legislative elections.

He diversified the group into civilian aircraft (Falcon) to reduce reliance on military contracts.

In 2000, upon reaching the company's statutory age limit, he became honorary chairman of Dassault Aviation. On June 27, 2014, he appointed Charles Edelstenne as his successor.

== Political career ==
Dassault was a member of the Union for a Popular Movement political party, as was his son Olivier, who was a deputy in the National Assembly. He was a former mayor of the city of Corbeil-Essonnes, a southern suburb of Paris.

In 2004, he became a senator, and in that position, he was an outspoken advocate of conservative positions on economic and employment issues, claiming that France's taxes and workforce regulations ruin its entrepreneurs. In 2005, he inaugurated the €2 million Islamic cultural centre (comprising a mosque) in his city of Corbeil-Essonnes. In November 2012, responding to the Ayrault government's plan to legalise same-sex marriage in France, he controversially said, during an interview for France Culture, that authorising it would cause "no more renewal of the population. [...] We'll have a country of homosexuals. And so in ten years there'll be nobody left. It's stupid."

== Honors and awards ==
- Grand Officer of the Order of Legion of Honour (2004)
- Officer of the Order of Ivory Merit
- Grand Officer of the Order of the Southern Cross (2009)

== Personal life and death ==
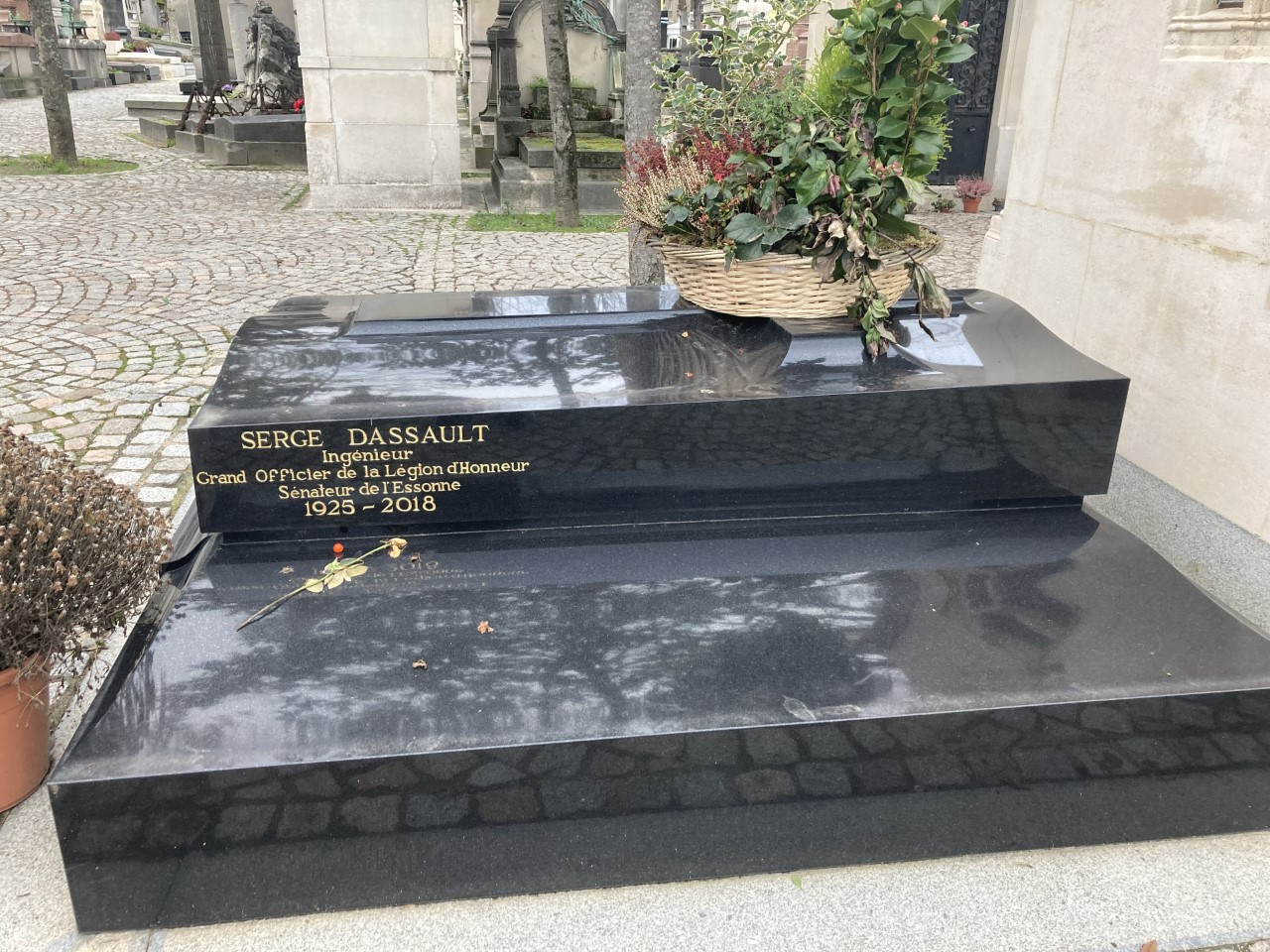
Grave of Serge Dassault in Paris

Dassault married Nicole Raffel on 5 July 1950. They had four children: Olivier, Laurent, Thierry, and Marie-Hélène.

He died suddenly in his office at the Dassault Group headquarters in Paris on 28 May 2018, from heart failure at the age of 93.

== See also ==
- List of French people by net worth
- The World's Billionaires
