= Laurence de Cambronne =

French journalist and novelist

- Born: Laurence Claude Deshayes de Cambronne; 1 May 1951 (age 75); Casablanca, French Morocco
- Occupations: Journalist and novelist
- Years active: 1972–2008
- Spouses: Marc Gilbert; Fabien Roland-Lévy
- Children: Jérémy, Alexandre, Paul, Hadrien and Raphaël

Laurence de Cambronne (born 1 May 1951, Casablanca, Morocco) is a French journalist and novelist.

== Biography ==
=== Family and formation ===
Descendant of Arnouph Deshayes de Cambronne who owned the Château d'Orrouy and Paul Cottin on her father's side and Ernest Picard-Destelan and Joseph Thebaud on her mother's side, she is a niece of rear admiral, François Picard-Destelan, former president of the International Monetary Fund, Jacques de Larosière, admiral of the United States Navy, Leo Hewlett Thebaud and American philanthropist, Louis A. Thebaud.

Laurence de Cambronne was married to the French journalist and television producer Marc Gilbert from 1973 to 1982, and to the journalist Fabien Roland-Lévy, from 1987 to 2003. In 1987, represented by the monarchist lawyer Raymond de Geouffre de la Pradelle and her notary Bruno Cheuvreux, she wins in appeal and inherits from her first husband, who committed suicide in 1982, from a will described as wishful thinking ("voeu pieux") and set a judicial precedent.

She went to the Cours Hattemer and Sainte-Marie de Neuilly.

=== Career ===
For Paris Match, from 1972 to 1983, she writes about nude beaches, alcoholism and interviews Georges Dumézil for Le Point in 1984, after joining ELLE magazine, in 1983.

She is editor in chief adjunct from 1993 to 2008, and interviews for the magazine : Lionel Jospin, Jean-Pierre Chevènement, Édith Cresson, Georgina Dufoix, Michel Rocard or Françoise Fabius. in charge of the pages Vie Privée, C’est mon histoire, Une journée avec, inspired by the last page of The Sunday Times Magazine, One day in the life of and the Elle à Paris section of the magazine.

She also participated in 1996 in the launch of the French television channel Téva.

In 2011 she withdrew from the "Literary Prize for Knowledge and research", created by the novelist Laurence Biava to reward "literary texts on science", the neo-nazi activist, Maxime Brunerie, known for having tried to kill the former President of the Republic Jacques Chirac on 14 July 2002, being part of the jury.

In 2015, during the European migrant crisis, she joins associations, in Leros, as a volunteer, to help creating shelters for Syrian women and children, during their Immigration to Greece.

In 2025, she describes in Le Monde the relation of her sister Béatrice in the sixties with the french producer Pierre Edelman (in French).

== Bibliography ==
=== Writer ===
- Le Danger de naître : Entretiens avec Laurence de Cambronne, with Claude Sureau, Plon, 1993
- Votre premier mois avec bébé : Les 100 questions que se pose une mère dans les jours qui suivent la naissance de son enfant, Robert Laffont, 1998
- Les petits agendas rouges, Plon, 2004
- Les plus belles histoires d'amour de Elle : C'est mon histoire, with Antoine Silber, Robert Laffont, 2006

=== Collection manager ===
- Gilles Verdiani, Mon métier de père, JC Lattès, 2012
- Marta de Tena, La garde alternée, JC Lattès, 2012
- Maryline Baumard, Vive la pension !, JC Lattès, 2012
- François Reynaert and Vincent Brocvielle, Le Kit du 21e siècle, JC Lattès, 2013
- Anne Dufourmantelle and Laure Leter, Se trouver, JC Lattès, 2014

=== Biographies ===
- Madame de Staël, la femme qui faisait trembler Napoléon, Allary Éditions, 2015
- Je suis d'Alep, itinéraire d'un migrant ordinaire, avec Joude Jassouma, Allary Éditions, 2017

== Awards ==
- Nomination for the Prix Simone Veil des Femmes de Lettres

== See also ==
- French literature
- French history
- French press
- Marc Gilbert (in French)
- Famille Cottin (in French)
