= Paul Cotton (disambiguation) =

Paul Cotton (1943–2021) was an American guitarist.

Paul Cotton may also refer to:

- Paul Cotton (diplomat) (born 1930), New Zealand's High Commissioner to Tonga from 1975 to 1976
- Paul Cotton (software developer), see Maciej Stachowiak

== See also ==
- Paul Cottin, French writer
