= French Politics, Culture & Society =

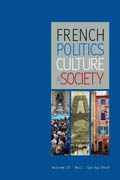
- Discipline: Sociology, political science
- Language: English, French
- Edited by: Herrick Chapman

Publication details
- History: 1983–present
- Publisher: Berghahn Books
- Frequency: Triannually

Standard abbreviations
- ISO 4: Fr. Politics Cult. Soc.

Indexing
- ISSN: 1537-6370 (print); 1558-5271 (web)

Links
- Journal homepage; Online access

French Politics, Culture & Society is a peer-reviewed academic journal published by Berghahn Books on behalf of the Conference Group on French Politics & Society (sponsored jointly by the Minda de Gunzburg Center for European Studies at Harvard University and the Institute of French Studies at New York University). It covers modern and contemporary France from the perspectives of the social sciences, history, and cultural analysis. It also explores the relationship of France to the rest of the world, especially Europe, the United States, and the former French colonies. The editor-in-chief is Herrick Chapman.

== Abstracting and indexing ==
French Politics, Culture & Society is indexed and abstracted in:

- America: History and Life
- British Humanities Index
- Columbia International Affairs Online
- Educational Resources Information Center
- Historical Abstracts
- InfoTrac
- International Bibliography of Book Reviews of Scholarly Literature on the Humanities and Social Sciences
- International Bibliography of Periodical Literature
- International Political Science Abstracts
- MLA International Bibliography
- Sociological Abstracts
- Worldwide Political Science Abstracts
