= Laurent Dassault =

French billionaire businessman

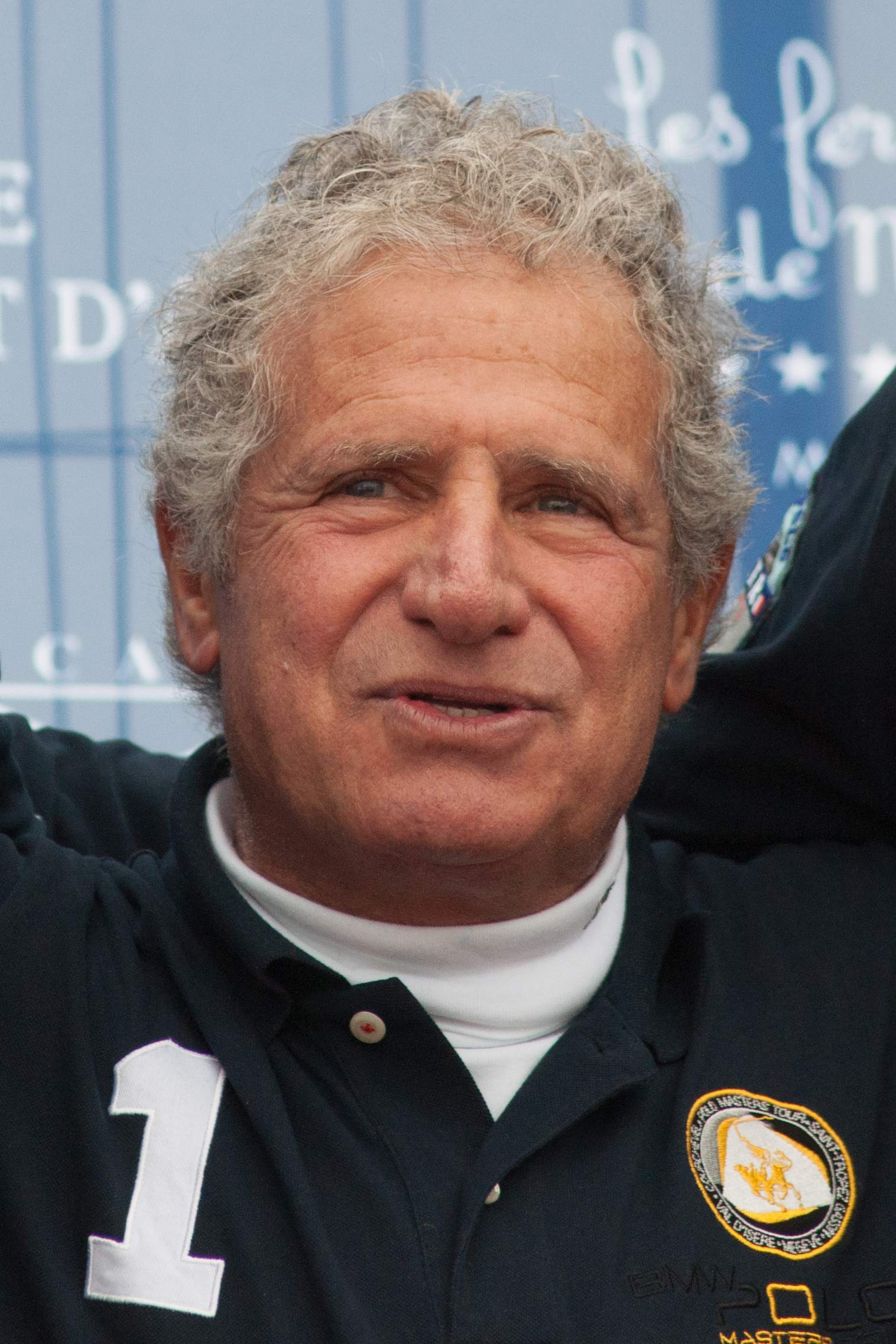
- Dassault in 2014
- Born: 7 July 1953 (age 73); Neuilly-sur-Seine, France
- Education: ESLSCA; Panthéon-Assas University
- Occupation: Businessman
- Spouse: Martine Dassault
- Children: 2
- Parent: Serge Dassault
- Relatives: Olivier Dassault (brother); Thierry Dassault (brother)

Laurent Dassault (French pronunciation: [lɔʁɑ̃ daso]) is a French billionaire businessman, and the co-managing director of Dassault Group, a French corporate group founded by his grandfather, Marcel Dassault. Dassault Group, notably, has business interests in the aerospace and software industries. As of June 2025, his estimated net worth was US$10.7 billion.

== Early life ==
Laurent Dassault was born on 7 July 1953 in Neuilly-sur-Seine, France, to father Serge Dassault. His father, Serge, was a businessman and politician, who also headed the Dassault Group, and his mother was Nicole. Dassault's grandfather, Marcel Dassault, founded the Dassault Group. His siblings are Olivier, Thierry and Marie-Helene. Dassault was educated at Ecole Superieure Libre Des Science Commerciales Appliquees and Paris-Pantheon-Assas University.

== Career ==
Early in his career, Dassault was involved in the banking industry, and in 1991, he joined his family's business group. Dassault's responsibilities in his family business group is to diversify the group's business interests for his family's future generations. Dassault has had leadership roles in Artcurial, an auction house owned by his family, as well as at Château Dassault and Château La Fleur Merissac, wine estates owned by the Dassault Group, in Saint-Émilion, Bordeaux, and vinyards in Argentina and Chile. In 2008, he was made an officer of the Order of Arts and Letters.

== Personal life ==
Dassault lives in Paris, France. He was married to Martine Dassault, who is deceased. Dassault has two sons, Julien and Adrien. In 2025, both of his sons replaced him on the supervisory board of Groupe Industriel Marcel Dassault SAS, the Dassault family's holding company.
