= Vathaire affair =

French scandal

Hervé de Vathaire
- Born: 1925 or 1926
- Disappeared: July 6, 1976, returned on September 26, 1976 (age 50); Paris, France
- Occupation: Private financial director of Marcel Dassault
- Spouse: Chantal Vathaire
- Children: 2

The Vathaire affair was a French politico-financial scandal of the 1970s, during the seven-year term of French President Valéry Giscard d'Estaing. In 1976, Hervé de Vathaire, an employee of the Dassault Group withdrew eight million francs from the account of Marcel Dassault and fled with Jean Kay, a mercenary. He was captured in September 1976, but the money was never recovered.

== Events ==
In 1976, Hervé de Vathaire, who was private financial director of Marcel Dassault, founder of the aerospace company the Dassault Group, had just lost his wife who had committed suicide. He was sick with cancer, was desperate and went to bars at night.

He met Jean Kay, who was a writer, adventurer, mercenary and member of the neofascist Paladin Group, through two women, Bernadette Roels, who was 36 years old and an ex-prostitute, and her friend who was Kay's partner, Danielle Marquet, who he met at a bar. He was seduced by Kay and the two women. Vathaire informed them that he had a compromising tax file against his boss. He decided, under the influence of Jean Kay, to blackmail Marcel Dassault.

In June 1976, the two went on a trip to Miami, Florida. According to various sources, it was either a vacation or a meeting with Cuban exiles.

== Disappearance and return ==
Jean Kay stole Vaithaire's file and blackmailed him in turn. On July 6, 1976, Vathaire went to a BNP Paribas branch and withdrew 8 million francs (800 million old francs, 1.2 million euros, $1.6 million at the time) from Marcel Dassault's account which he put in two big bags, and then disappeared with Jean Kay. Vathaire was found, with part of the money. Jean Kay was untraceable. On August 27, two days after the resignation of Jacques Chirac as Prime Minister, the press learned of the scandal and the Vathaire affair came to light.

Vathaire returned to Paris from the Greek island of Corfu on September 8, 1976, and was arrested, but had none of the stolen funds in his possession. What happened to the missing money remains a mystery. Some sources theorized that it may have financed the Lebanese Christian Phalangists in the middle of the Lebanese civil war. Others speculated that the money might have funded two burglaries that were used to finance international networks of the extreme right, including the efforts of Albert Spaggiari who organized the burglary of the Société Générale in Nice in August, 1976.

== Bibliography ==
- Our honorable president of Laurent Valdiguié, ed. Albin Michel, 2002 (chapter 7: "The Vathaire fire")
- The Sunday Journal, September 5, 1976
- Paris Match n ° 1456 from September 29, 1976
- Paris Match 1426 (??) of September 25, 1976
- The New York Times, September 20, 1976
- L'Express, September 13, 1976
- France-Soir, from September 4, 7, 8, 9, 10 and 12, 1976
- Le Point, number 208, 209, 213, 214, 223, 236.
- Monsieur Dassault, by Pierre Assouline, Edition Balland ISBN 978-2-7158-0406-7
