= Hôtel Marcel Dassault =

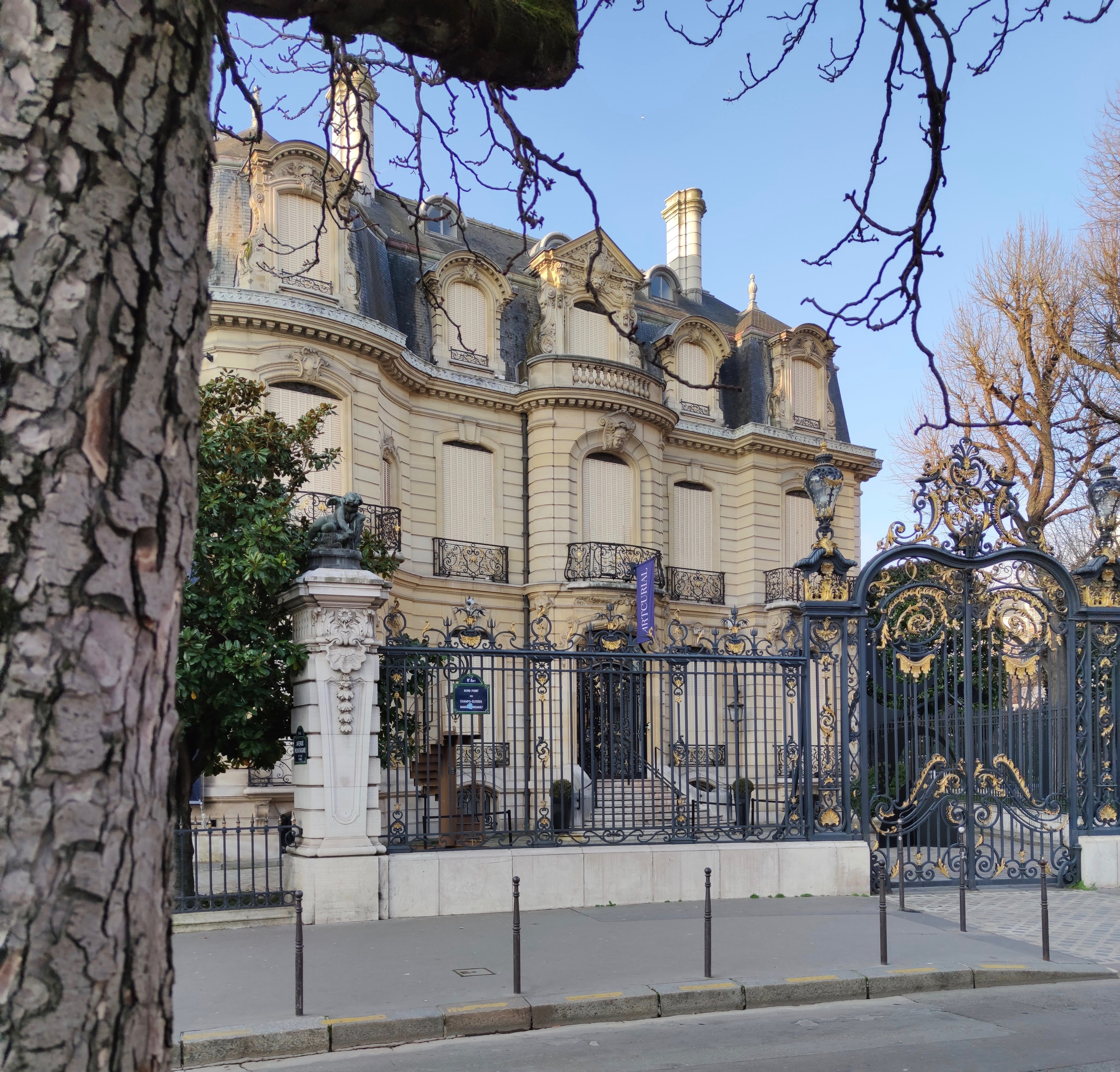
- Interactive map of the Hôtel Marcel Dassault area

General information
- Coordinates: 48.8684°N 2.309°E

The Hôtel Marcel Dassault (French pronunciation: [otɛl maʁsɛl daso]) is a hôtel particulier, (private mansion), in Paris, France.

== Location ==
It is located at 7 Rond-point des Champs-Elysées in the 8th arrondissement of Paris.

== History ==
It was built in 1844.

It was acquired by Marcel Dassault in 1952. Since 2002, it has been home to Artcurial, an auction house owned by the Dassault Group.
