= Thierry Dassault =

French entrepreneur

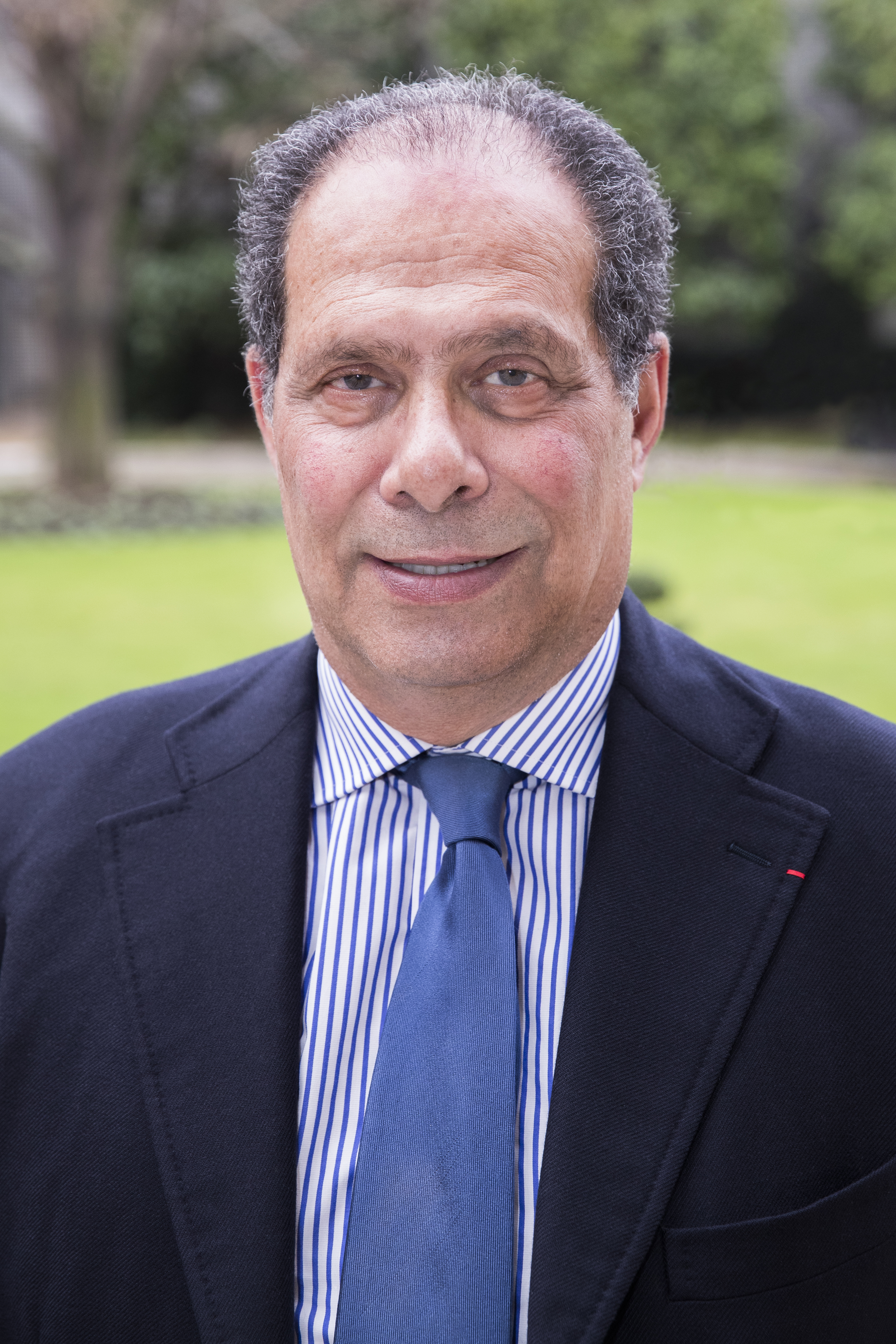
- Dassault in 2020
- Born: 26 March 1957 (age 69); Neuilly-sur-Seine, France
- Occupations: Businessman; President of the supervisory board of Dassault Group
- Father: Serge Dassault
- Relatives: Olivier Dassault (brother); Laurent Dassault (brother)

Thierry Dassault (French pronunciation: [tjɛʁi daso]; born 26 March 1957) is a French billionaire businessman. He is chairman of the supervisory board and deputy CEO of the Dassault Group.

He is the son of Serge Dassault and grandson of Marcel Dassault. His brothers are Olivier Dassault and Laurent Dassault, and his sister Marie-Hélène Habert.

Dassault is a bachelor and has one child, Olivier Ken Marco Simunec-Pedossaut. He is of Jewish descent.

== Wealth ==
According to Forbes, Dassault is worth an estimated $9.6 billion, making him the 344th richest person in the world.
