= Whippany River Club =

Former country club in Morris County, New Jersey

- Whippany River Country Club
- Established: 1903
- Type: Country club
- Location: Morristown, New Jersey, U.S.

Whippany River Club was a country club in Morristown, New Jersey, United States, established in 1903 as an exclusive social and sporting club for wealthy residents of Morris County. The club offered activities including polo, horseback riding, tennis, handball, trap shooting, and steeplechasing, as well as social events and exhibitions.

== History ==
The Whippany River Club was proposed in March 1903. The club was formally established on December 10, 1903, when 12 wealthy men from Morristown met on Wall Street to organize an exclusive country club in Morris County, New Jersey. The club's first governing body included businessman Benjamin Nicoll as president, Charles F. Cutler as vice president, Norman Henderson as Secretary, and Frederic O. Spedden as Treasurer. Colonel A. C. Potter served as superintendent and was responsible for managing the club's grounds and facilities.

The club leased property belonging to Eugene S. Higgins in the Morristown area. Higgins had developed the estate with a polo field, grandstand, half-mile track, stable, and courts for tennis, racquetball, and croquet.

The Whippany River Club opened for its first season in June 1904. A road coach known as the Magnet began transporting members between Morristown and Bernardsville in May 1905. Transportation to the club was also facilitated by the Delaware, Lackawanna and Western Railroad, which arranged for trains to stop near the main entrance.

== Activities and facilities ==
The Whippany River Club catered to wealthy members and emphasized sporting and social activities. Its grounds hosted polo matches, steeplechases, trap shooting, handball, horseback riding, dog shows, and flower exhibitions.

The club controlled about 90 acres of grounds, with landscaped walks and drives, lawns, and mature trees. The clubhouse was one of the original buildings from the Higgins estate and was remodeled for use by the club. Its facilities included a large reception hall that could also be used as a ballroom. It was used for dances, concerts, and wedding receptions in addition to club activities. Behind the reception area was a private women's sitting room and a men's lounging room. The building also contained an office, pantry, kitchen, wine room, servants' quarters, laundry, and other service rooms. A tower accessible from the attic provided views of the surrounding countryside, and telephone connections were available throughout the house.

A wing of the clubhouse contained two squash courts and a racquet court. Three tennis courts were located on the grounds, with verandas overlooking the courts.

The main stables stood near the southeast corner of the clubhouse. The main stables had room for 34 horses, while a farm stable behind the clubhouse accommodated another 25. The grounds also included a toolhouse, farm barn, garden, and shooting range. Members included prominent trap shooters such as Louis A. Thebaud, Norman Henderson, Robert H. McCurdy, and Henry Phipps.

A steeplechase course encircled the 90-acre estate and included natural obstacles. The course began directly in front of the clubhouse and was used by members for riding.

The club's polo grounds were west of the shooting range and were surrounded by groves and a training track. A grandstand provided seating for spectators, while a lodge stood near the polo field. The grounds hosted matches between visiting teams, including the Rockaway Hunt Club and Westchester Polo Club. Among the club's earliest polo players were Benjamin Nicoll, Norman Henderson, Robert H. McCurdy, and Rudolph H. Kissel. Following the dissolution of the Morristown Polo Club, its members joined the Whippany River Club in May 1904. The new organization took over the former club's United States Polo Association membership and established a polo team for the summer and fall of 1904. The Whippany River Club polo team became affiliated in 1906. Its colors were green and white, with a white cap. The club's local polo tournament was the Whippany River Cup.

The Whippany River Club held its first annual dog show on September 25, 1909, at its grounds in Morristown. More than 700 dogs were entered, making it one of the largest dog shows in the East outside exhibitions in New York, Philadelphia, and Boston. The exhibition included foxhound and beagle packs judged with their huntsmen in uniform.

== Decline and closure ==
The club experienced financial difficulties during its early years despite its wealthy membership. In 1910, a fire destroyed the clubhouse, stables, and courts. The loss was estimated at $40,000, and employees were able to save the club's horses before the arrival of the Morristown fire department. At the time, the club had fourteen polo horses, four ponies belonging to Fillmore Hyde, four belonging to William Post, and three belonging to Charles Munn, among others.

The club rebuilt on a smaller scale, but its financial problems continued. The Whippany River Club eventually ceased operations during the Great Depression.

== Legacy ==
The former Whippany River Club became an example of the exclusive sporting and social clubs associated with the Gilded Age. The property had included extensive sporting facilities and was associated with the wealthy social community that developed around Morristown during the early 20th century.
