= Edward Thebaud =

American merchant (1798–1884)

Edward Thebaud (June 1798–1884) was an American merchant.

Edward Thebaud was born in Beekman Street, New York City, in June 1798, the son of Joseph Thebaud, who was an agent of the French East India Company. When very young, he was sent to Moravian University at Bethlehem, Pennsylvania, for his education. Upon attaining his majority he found an ample fortune awaiting him. Being, however, of industrial habits, and wishing to lead a mercantile life, he entered as clerk in G.G.&S. Howland, the leading commercial house in Pennsylvania. He made several voyages as supercargo; and upon severing this connection formed a partnership with his father's old clerk, under the firm name Bouchaud & Thebaud, later the Thebaud Brothers. In 1826, he withdrew from the house, retiring to his estate near Morristown.

In 1823 Thebaud married Emma Van Shwalkwyck de Boisaubin, the daughter of the exiled French nobleman, Vincent Boisaubin, who came to the United States to escape being killed during the French Revolution, and gave his name to the Boisaubin Manor. They had twelve children by this marriage, including Leo G. Thebaud, a founding student and instructor of Seton Hall University. Upon the death of his father-in-law in 1834, Thebaud moved to New York, having purchased a mansion known as LeRoy Place in Bleecker Street, where he lived for many years though he retained a country seat at Morristown. He resumed business with his old partner, which continued until the retirement of the former in 1850. In 1850 he also admitted his eldest son as a partner, the firm now being Edward Thebaud & Son. Thebaud retired from mercantile life in 1858, leaving his interests in the hands of his two sons (another son having in the meantime been received as partner), the firm name being changed to that of Edward Thebaud's Sons.

Soon after his retirement, Thebaud with his wife and daughter visited numerous relatives in Europe. Upon his return he occupied his mansion situated at Madison, later known as Thebaud Place. He died in his eighty-sixth year at his homestead and was buried in St. Vincent's cemetery. He was much respected by his fellow citizens, who attended his funeral in large numbers and caused the town flag to be lowered in his honor. He was the grandfather of Leo Hewlett Thebaud and Louis A. Thebaud. .
