= Bordeaux-Aéronautique =

French aeronautic company

- Industry: Aerospace, Defense
- Founded: 1939
- Founder: Marcel Dassault (born Marcel Bloch)
- Headquarters: Talence, France
- Key people: André Curvale; Henri Deplante; Claude de Cambronne
- Products: Civil aircraft Military aircraft
- Parent: Dassault Group

Bordeaux Aéronautique (BA) was a French aeronautic company founded on 17 March 1939, by Marcel Bloch, André Curvale, Henri Deplante and Claude de Cambronne.

== History ==
Facing plane production increase, the SAAMB buys in September 1939, in Talence, near Bordeaux, industrial buildings in a workshop next to the Château de Brama (also called Castle of Edward, the Black Prince) which is retroceded to Bordeaux-Aéronautique. France produces at that time the most important rearmament.

The company was supposed to produce for the Vichy French Air Force, front fuselages of Bloch MB.175 and Bloch MB.1020 aircraft, but after the Battle of Dunkirk, production stopped at the end of 1940, during the German military administration when Marcel Bloch is arrested on 6 October 1940. During his detention at Thiers, theCommissariat général aux questions juives sends to the regional directions of the economic epuration service of Marseilles and Limoges the order to investigate the Bloch companies.

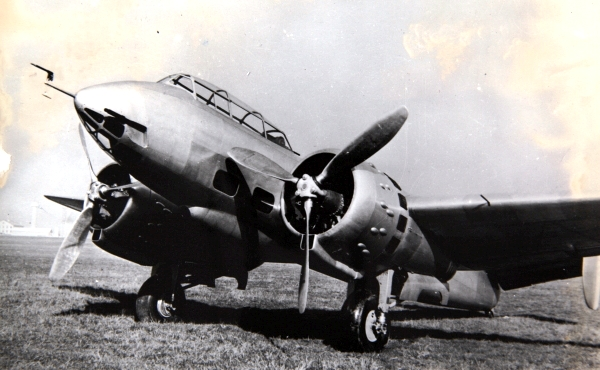
Bloch MB 170

Bloch MB 170

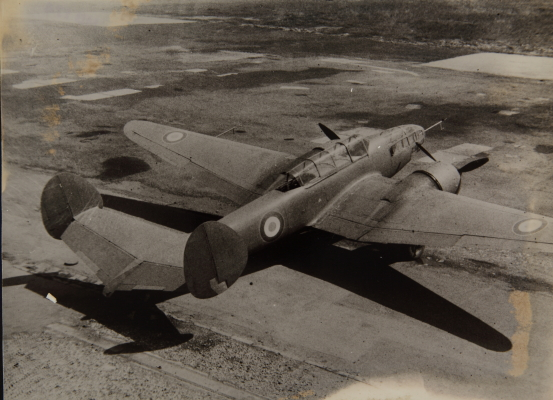
Bloch MB 174

The Comité d'organisation de l'aéronautique directed by Joseph Roos achieves to slow down all processes of Aryanisation, but in 1942, the German authorities of the Militärbefehlshaber in Frankreich (MBF) name a short-term administrator of the Bloch company in Saint-Cloud, Jean de Broë. On 20 December 1940, Marcel Bloch delegates authority to Henri Carol.

The Vichy French Air Force uses Bloch MB.150 family fighter aircraft and Bloch MB.170 family bomber aircraft, equipping all fighter and bomber units in the unoccupied zone under the Franco-German Agreements. Also being limited to three groups stationed in North Africa. In November, 173 MB.152/155 are gathered at Guyancourt, Orange-Caritat and Châteauroux, for use in training fighter pilots for the Luftwaffe.

Chuck Yeager, first pilot confirmed to have exceeded the Sound barrier in level flight (played by Sam Shepard in The Right Stuff), flew P-51 Mustangs in combat with the 363d Fighter Squadron, named Glamorous Glen, and survived after he was shot down over Nérac, between Bordeaux and Toulouse, in his first aircraft (P-51B-5-NA s/n 43-6763) on March 5, 1944 during his eighth mission, by Focke-Wulf Fw 190 from the Ergänzungs-Jagdgruppe West, based in Cazaux and directed by Herbert Wehnelt, 1971-1974 commander of the German Air Force Command.

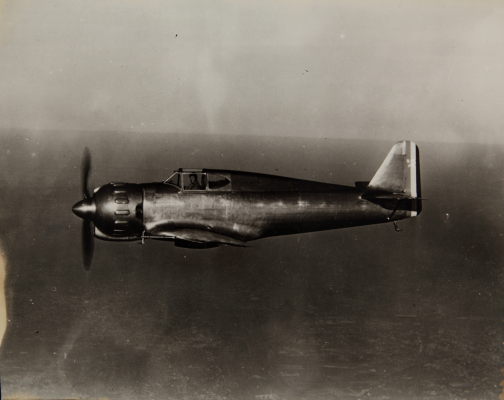
Bloch MB 151

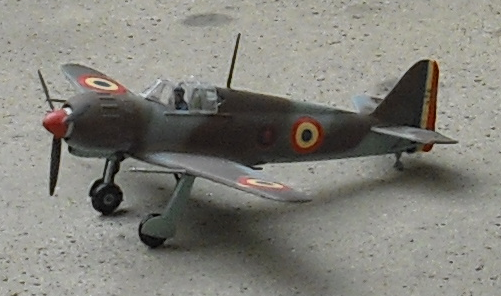
Bloch MB 152

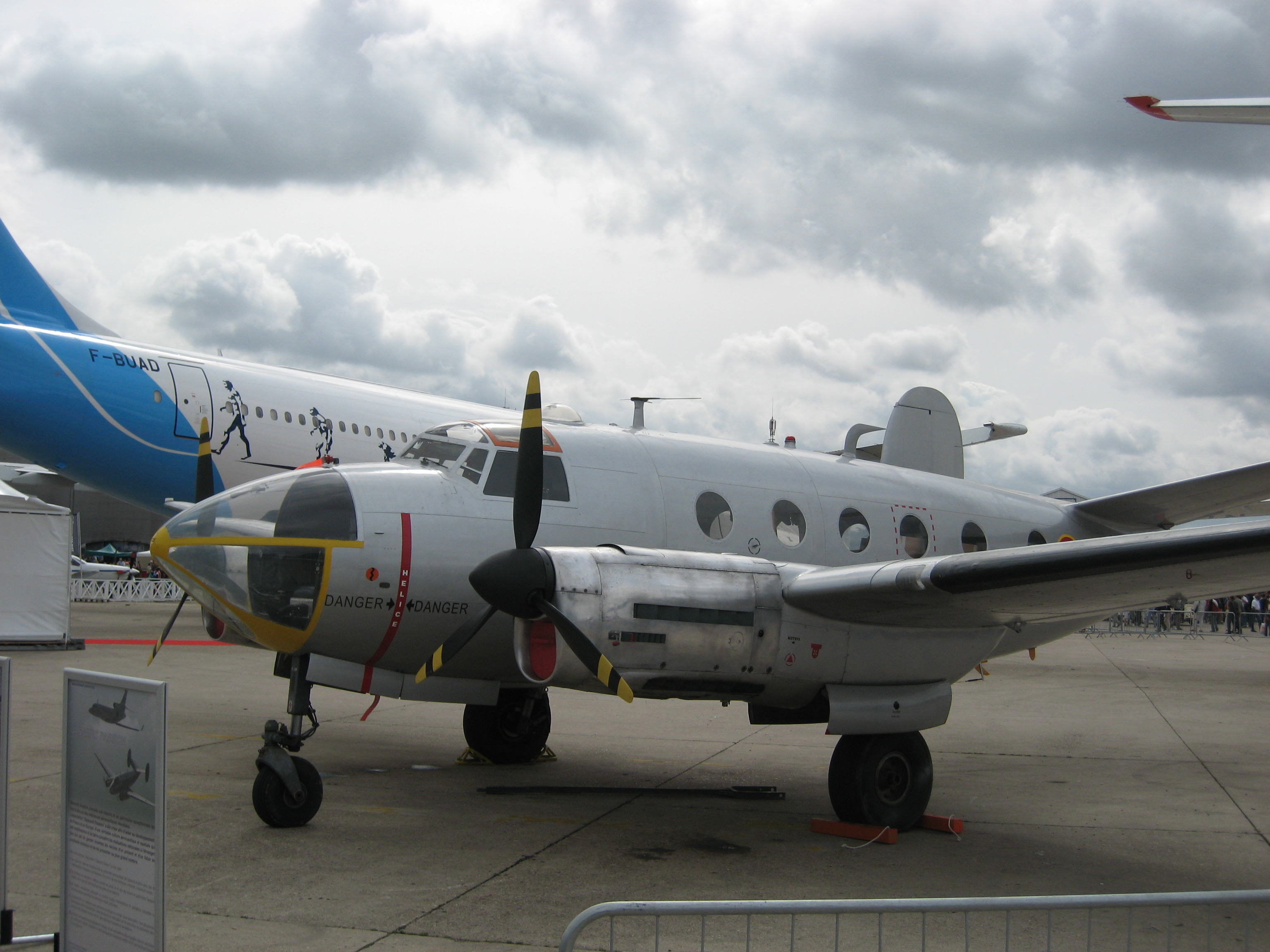
MD 311

After leaving Pau on 20 August 1944, the Germans leave Bordeaux on 28 August. SNCASO comes back to Bordeaux–Mérignac Airport to work for the Allies and after his return from Buchenwald, in April 1945, Marcel Dassault (née Bloch) calls back the group of Talence to relaunch his aircraft company. In June 1945 Marcel Dassault reorganizes the BA 30 project and in July 1946, two prototypes are ordered: the Sud-Ouest Bretagne and the Dassault MD 315 Flamant (Note: The MD 315 Flamant was transferred in 1951 in Indochina to equip the new South Vietnam Air Force of Emperor Bảo Đại, in Blida where it fired the world's first wire-guided anti-tank missiles (the SS.11) against fighters entrenched in mountain caves and gorges in Algeria's Aurès region, before French hijacking of the FLN plane and 1964 Gabonese coup d'état (Operation Simba). It appears also in Canon bleu ne répond plus by Tanguy et Laverdure (1966).) with the SNECMA-Argus S12 and V12 that equipped the Fw 189. In 1947, Jacques Chaban-Delmas, former general of the French Résistance close to the aircraft manufacturer, becomes Mayor (Maire) of Bordeaux.

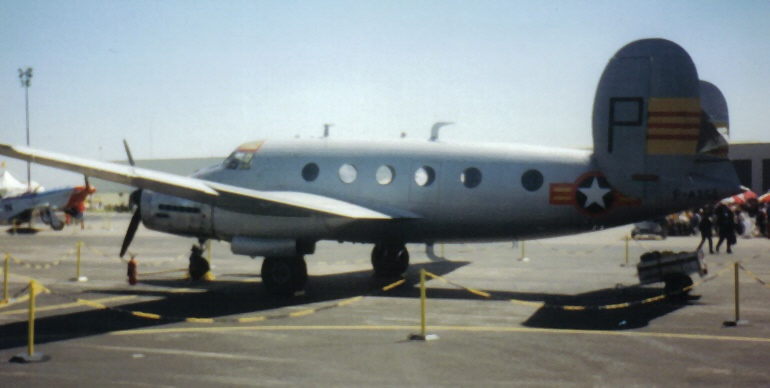
Flamant in Rouen

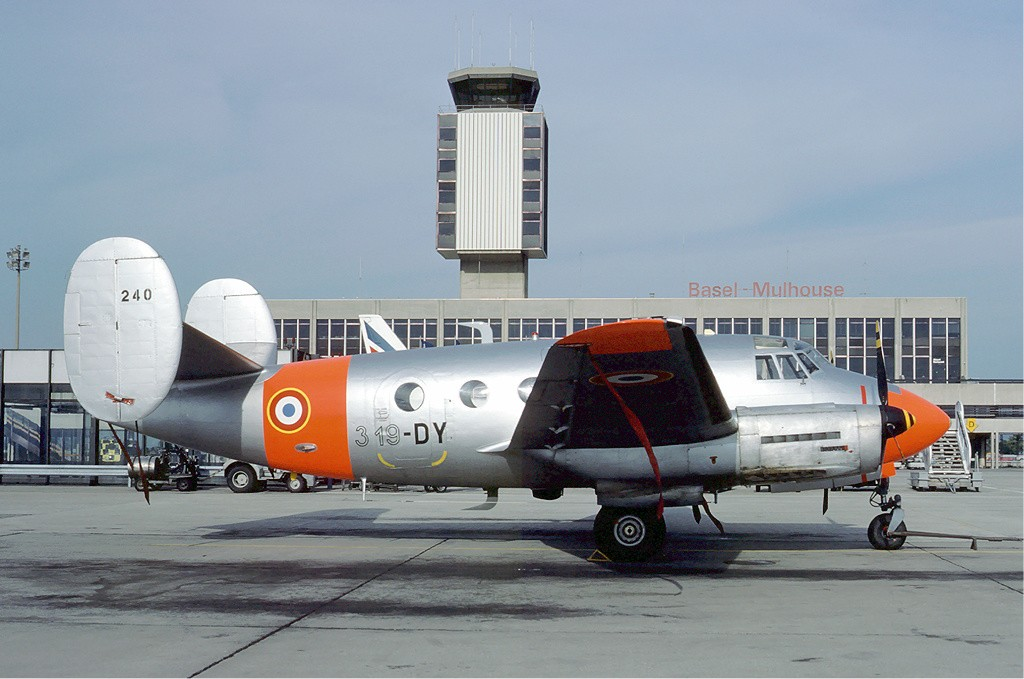
Flamant Basle

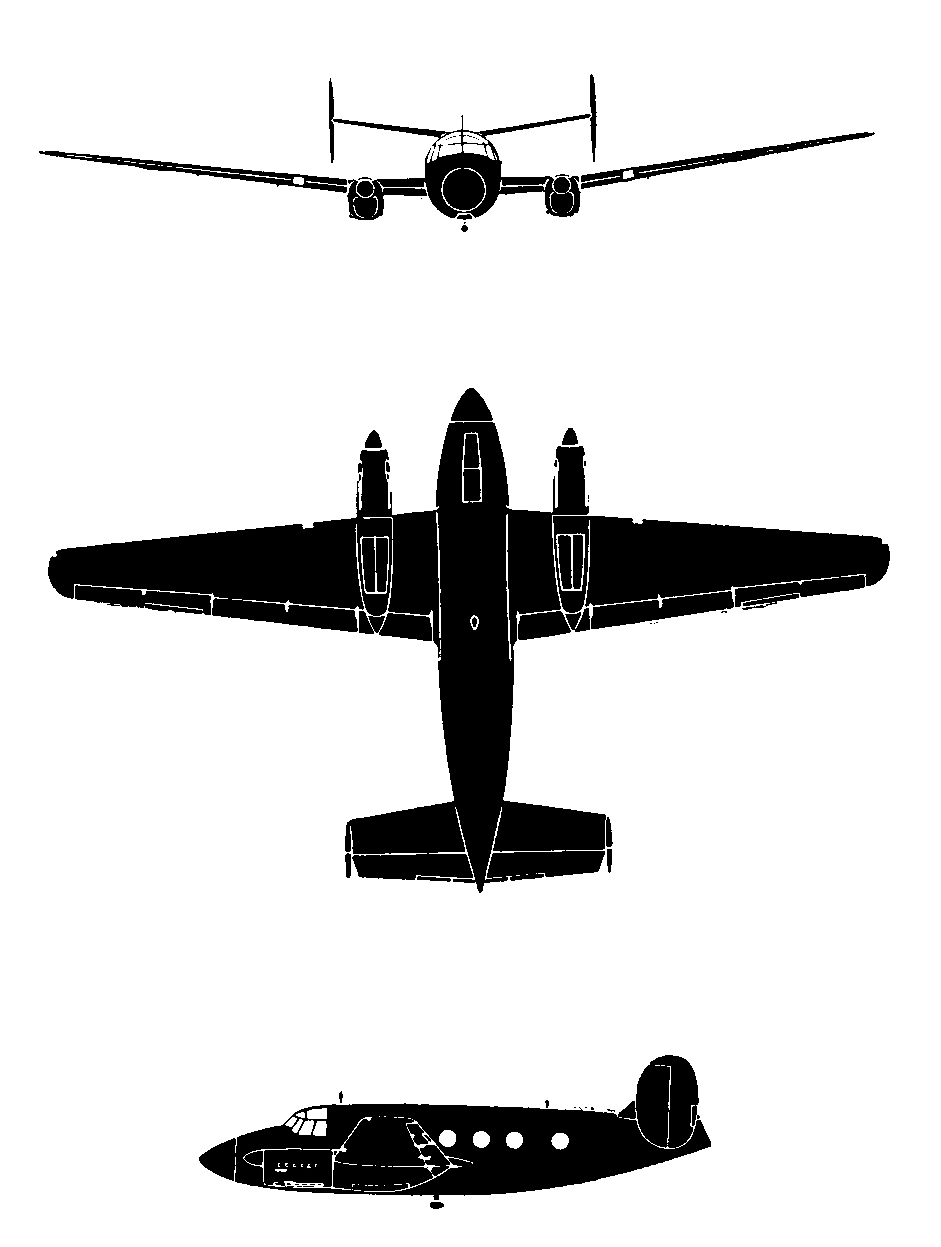
Flamant Silh

== See also ==
- Groupe Dassault
- Dassault Aviation
- German military administration in occupied France during World War II
- Battle of the Atlantic

== Bibliography ==
- Marcel Dassault, Le Talisman (autobiographie), éd. J'ai Lu, 1970 et éd. Jours de France, 1973
- Jean-Yves Lorant, Le Focke-Wulf 190, Paris, avec Jean-Bernard Frappé, Editions Larivière, coll. « Docavia », 1981, 408 p.
- Guy Audrain, Le Bureau d’études de Bordeaux, 1982
- Pierre Assouline, Monsieur Dassault, Balland, 1983, ISBN 9782715804067
- Herrick Chapman, State Capitalism and Working-Class Radicalism in the French Aircraft Industry. Berkeley: University of California Press, 1991
- Claude d'Abzac-Epezy, L'Armée de l'air des années noires : Vichy 1940-1944, avec Général Maurice Schmitt, 1998
- Claude Carlier, Marcel Dassault la légende d'un siècle, Perrin, 2002
- Patrick Facon, La guerre aérienne, 1933-1945, 2003
- Guy Vadepied (avec la collaboration de Pierre Péan), Marcel Dassault ou les ailes du pouvoir, éd. Fayard, 2003
- Vincent Giraudier, Les bastilles de vichy, répression politique et internement administratif, Editions Taillandier, 2009 ISBN 978-2847344141
- Claude Carlier, Dassault, de Marcel à Serge, Cent ans d'une étonnante aventure humaine, industrielle et politique, Perrin, 2017
- Alain Juppé, Dictionnaire amoureux de Bordeaux, Plon, 2018
- Malcolm Abbott, Jill Bamforth, The Early Development of the Aviation Industry: Entrepreneurs of the Sky, Taylor & Francis, 2019
