= Marino Di Teana =

Italian sculptor

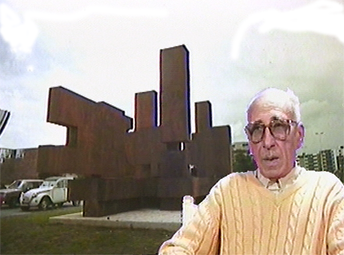
- Marino Di Teana in 1995
- Born: Francesco Marino; August 8, 1920; Teana, Basilicata
- Died: January 1, 2012 (aged 91); Périgny, Île-de-France
- Education: Architectural National School
- Known for: Sculpture
- Website: diteana.com

Francesco Marino, better known as Marino Di Teana (August 8, 1920 – January 1, 2012) was an Italian Argentine sculptor.

== History ==
He emigrated to Argentina, working as a bricklayer at the age of 16 and became a construction site manager at 22. At the same time, he studied at the Salguero Polytechnic at the Architectural National School. He entered the Higher National School of Fine Arts Ernesto de la Carcova in Buenos Aires via an entrance competition and graduated with the title of Higher Professor and obtained a professorship at that school. He won the Premio Mittre, equivalent to the European Grand Prix de Rome.
