= Louis A. Thebaud =

- Born: October 4, 1859; Orange, New Jersey, U.S.
- Died: April 2, 1939 (aged 79); Morristown, New Jersey, U.S.
- Occupation(s): Businessman, sportsman, philanthropist
- Spouses: Gertrude Lee McCurdy; Andrée des Etangs
- Relatives: Richard Aldrich McCurdy (father-in-law)

Louis A. Thebaud (October 24, 1859 – April 2, 1939) was an American businessman, sportsman and philanthropist in the Gilded Age. After working for C. H. Raymond & Co., a contractor of the Mutual Life Insurance Company, for a dozen years, he was caught in a corporate scandal and sued alongside other members of his family. In his retirement, he sponsored sailing races and supported the First World War effort as well as a hospital in New Jersey. Additionally, he introduced Brittany spaniels, a breed of hunting dogs, to the United States, and he was the founding president of the American Brittany Club.

== Early life ==
Louis A. Thebaud was born on October 24, 1859, in Orange, New Jersey. His parents were Paul Louis Thébaud and his first wife, born Mathilde Louisa Pillot. He was of French descent. The Thébaud family, who were members of the French nobility, had emigrated to the United States in the wake of the French Revolution, where they ran an import-export business. His great grandfather was Joseph Thebaud and his grandfather Edward Thebaud.

== Business career ==
Thebaud worked for C. H. Raymond & Co. from 1893 to 1906. The firm, headed by Charles H. Raymond, was a contractor for the Mutual Life Insurance Company, whose president was his father-in-law. In 1906, Thebaud was sued by the company alongside his father-in-law, brother-in-law, and Raymond, over a corporate scandal. As early as 1905, the press revealed he was paid between $920,113 and $932,831 in commissions by Mutual life. The scandal was described by The Washington Post as a prime example of nepotism.

Thebaud served on the board of directors of the Morristown Trust Company.

== Philanthropy ==
Thebaud and his wife made charitable contributions to the American Field Service in France during the First World War. They also supported an all girls' school in Saint-Briac-sur-Mer, Brittany, France. Additionally, they donated US$200,000 to the All Souls Hospital in Morristown, New Jersey, US$100,000 of which were donated specifically by his wife. They also donated an ambulance in 1930.

== Boating and hunting ==
Thebaud sponsored the Gertrude L. Thebaud, an American schooner named in honor of his wife, in 1930. It won the Lipton Trophy in 1930.

Thebaud first imported griffons, a breed of hunting dogs, to the United States. Later, he introduced the Brittany spaniel, another breed of hunting dogs, to the United States. Thebaud used Brittany spaniels on his quail hunts in Florida. Meanwhile, two of his dogs, Franche de Cosqueron and Genette du Mesnil, were recorded in the Field Dog Stud Book. Additionally, his dogs competed in field trials and dog shows.

Thebaud and Louis de la Fleche co-founded the Brittany Spaniel Club of North America (later known as the American Brittany Club) in 1936. Thebaud served as its first president.

== Personal life ==
In November 1886, Thebaud married Gertrude Lee McCurdy, the daughter of Richard Aldrich McCurdy, president of the Mutual Life Insurance Company of New York. The couple resided at Idlewild, a mansion in Morris Plains, New Jersey. By 1905, McCurdy acquired a 300-acre estate in Morristown, New Jersey from B.O. Canfield in 1905, tore it down, and commissioned the construction of a new mansion called Beauregard.

Gertrude died on November 24, 1930, and Thébaud married Andrée des Etangs on April 26, 1933. There were no children of either marriage.

Thebaud was a co-founder of the Whippany River Club, a millionaire's club in Morristown, alongside Robert McCurdy, R.H. Williams, Rudolph Kissel, Gordon McDonald, Benjamin Nicoll, Robert D. Foote, Norman Henderson, Arthur R. Whitney, Frederick O. Spedden, W. DeLancy Kountze, Francis H. Kinnicutt.

== Death ==
Thebaud died on April 2, 1939, in hospital in Morristown, New Jersey.
