= Joseph Thebaud =

- Born: 1772
- Died: 1811 (aged 38–39)
- Employer(s): French East India Company; Thebaud Brothers

Joseph Thebaud (1772–1811) was an agent of the French East India Company, and later in about 1792 founded Thebaud Brothers, a commission house in New York City. Founder of the French Benevolent Society of New York.

== History ==
A nineteenth-century account of his life states that he first settled in Boston, where he stayed for a short time, then moved to New Haven, where he married Marie Therese Felicité Le Breton, a daughter of a gentleman from Martinique. Notable among their children was Edward Thebaud.

Moving again to New York, he set up in business and became one of the leading merchants of the city. He lived at 121 Beekman Street, and had his counting-room opposite, at No. 11. He had a country house on a site where Orchard Street later ran.

Thebaud was an amateur botanist and passionately fond of flowers. His greenhouses were at the time the wonder of the town. He took great pride in showing his flowers. His neighbors were David Dunham, Cornelius Dubois, and the Stuyvesant family. He founded the Societe Francaise de Bienfaisance (French Benevolent Society of New York), and was a leading director and friend to the old Mechanics' Bank.

== Family ==
He is the ancestor of Vice Admiral François Picard-Destelan, Vice Admiral Leo Hewlett Thebaud, Rear Admiral Cynthia McCulley Thebaud, former president of the International Monetary Fund Jacques de Larosière, and French journalist Laurence de Cambronne.

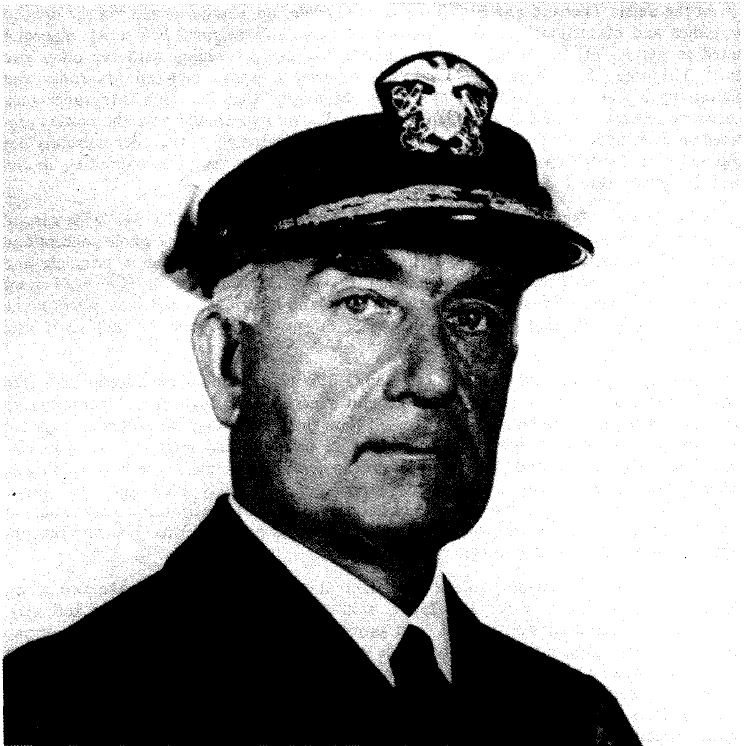
Leo Hewlett Thebaud

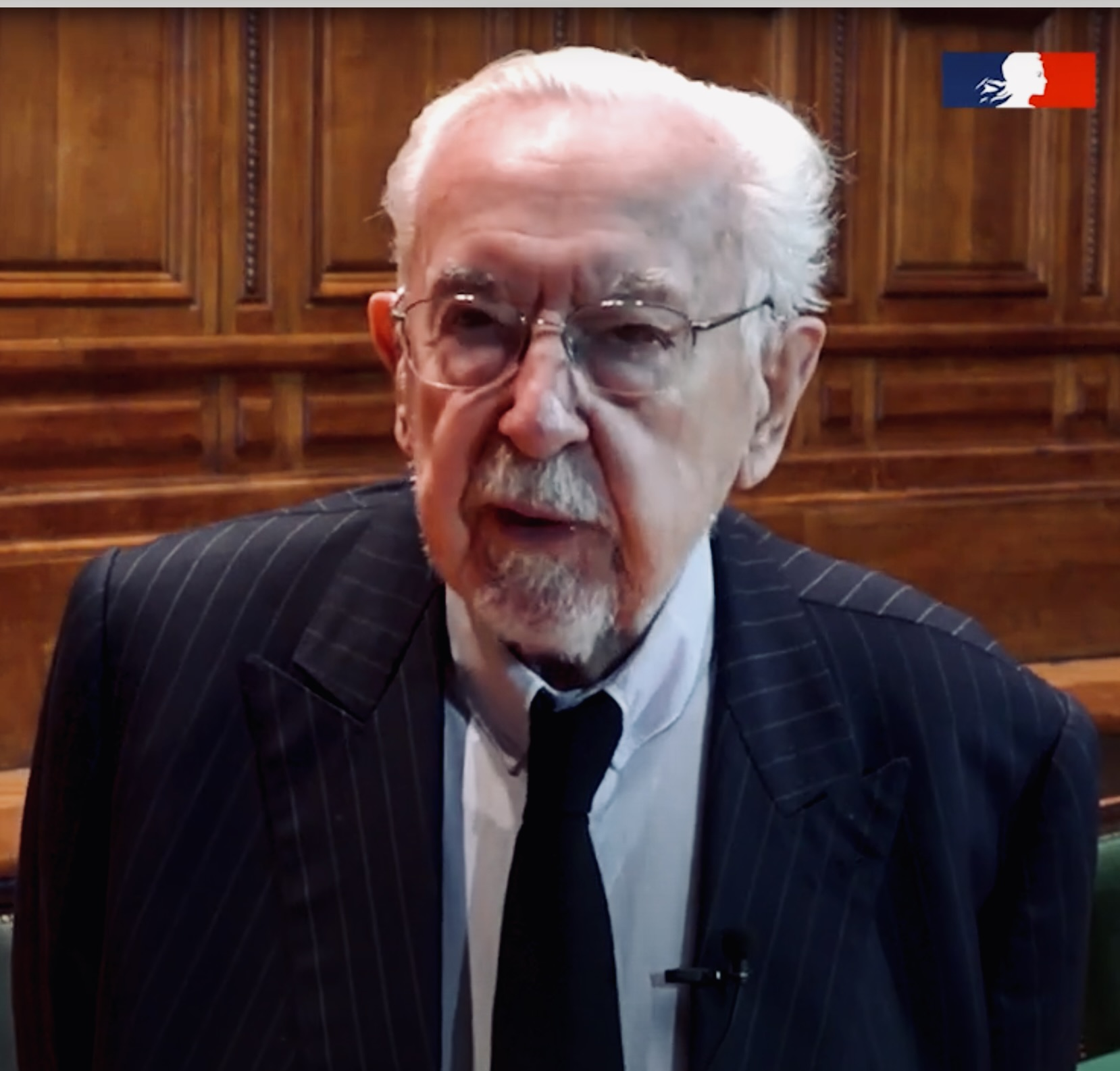
Jacques de Larosière

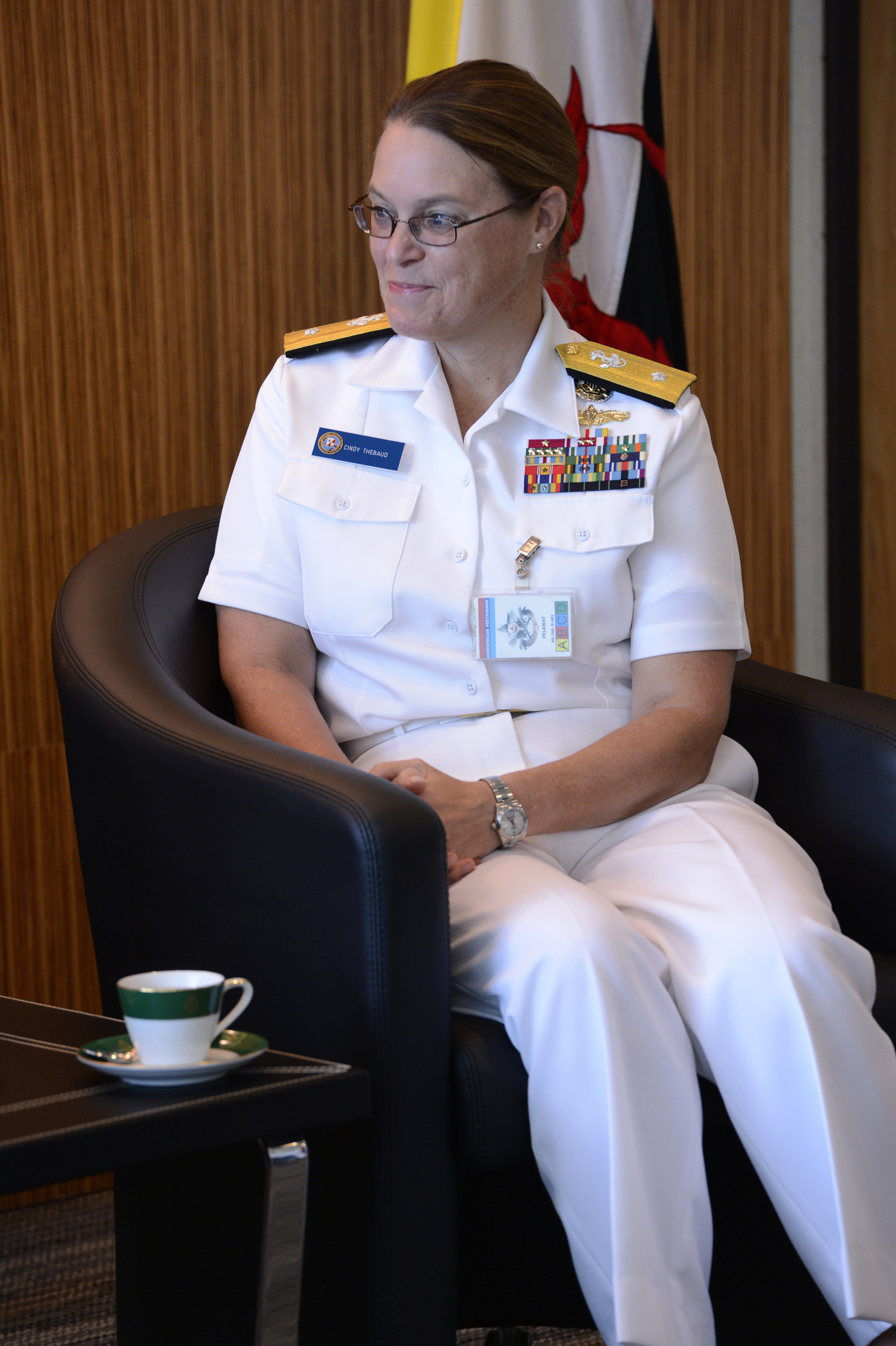
Cindy Thebaud

== See also ==
- Peter Claver Building
- French Hospital (Manhattan)
- Leonis C. Malburg

== Sources ==
- Scoville, Joseph Alfred (1863). The Old Merchants of New York City. New York: Carlton.
