= Madeleine Dassault =

French industrialist (1901–1992)

- Born: Madeleine Minckès; 28 April 1901; Thessaloniki, Greece
- Died: 12 July 1992 (aged 91); Paris, France
- Occupation: Industrialist
- Spouse: Marcel Dassault
- Children: 2, including Serge Dassault

Madeleine Dassault (French pronunciation: [madlɛn daso]; née Minckès; 28 April 1901 - 12 July 1992) was a French industrialist. She was married to the business magnate Marcel Dassault and helped him finance his early business ventures. During World War II, she was captured by the Nazis and sent to Drancy internment camp. She became one of the wealthiest women in Europe. In 1964, she was kidnapped and held for ransom. Following her husband's death in 1986, she had substantial interests in Dassault Group and its subsidiaries, serving on the boards of multiple corporations.

== Early life and marriage ==
Madeleine Minckès was born on 28 April 1901 to Hirsh Minckès, a furniture manufacturer, in Thessaloniki, Greece. Her father, Hirch, was a Jewish man from Vilnius. She married aircraft designer Marcel Dassault (then Marcel Bloch) in July 1919. She persuaded her father to help finance her husband's initial business ventures into aviation. They had two sons, Serge and Claude.

== World War II ==
During the Nazi occupation of France in World War II, her husband refused to aid authorities from the occupation. He was deported to Germany in 1944 and held in the Buchenwald concentration camp. Madeleine and her two sons were also sent to the Drancy internment camp. They were released from the camp in August 1944. Marcel was also later released and the family was back together by April 1945.

Following the war, the Blochs changed their surname to Dassault. They converted to Roman Catholicism from Judaism.

== Post-war life ==
The Dassault business had become enormously successful by the 1950s. Madeleine remained in the background, garnering little publicity for herself. She became one of the wealthiest women in Europe.

=== Kidnapping ===
Dassault was kidnapped on 23 May 1964 in front of her home facing the Bois de Boulogne park. Two men in masks hit Mr Dassult on the head with a pistol. Madeleine struck one of the men in the stomach with her umbrella but was taken by the men, who held her for ransom. Following a nationwide manhunt, she was rescued from kidnappers at an abandoned farmhouse north of Paris. Her rescuers didn't recognize her immediately and she had to show them her photo on the front page of the France-Soir. The Organisation armée secrète was believed to be behind the attack.

=== Later life ===
Following the death of her husband in 1986, Dassault and her sons had substantial interests in Dassault Group and control of industrial corporations involved in avionics, pharmaceuticals, real estate, media, and electronics. She served on the boards of multiple corporations.

Dassault died on 12 July 1992 in Paris.
