= Paul Cottin =

French librarian (1856–1932)

- Born: 5 June 1856; Boussy-Saint-Antoine, France
- Died: 22 February 1932 (aged 75)
- Occupations: Historian; Writer

Paul Cottin (5 June 1856 – 22 February 1932) was a French writer, historian and a scientific editor of historical and literary documents.

== Biography ==
He was the son of a Parisian notary and nephew of François Augustin Cottin, state advisor of the Second Empire (whose daughter married Frédéric Masson), he became, in 1881, librarian and curator of the Bibliothèque de l'Arsenal of the Pavillon de l'Arsenal, after José-Maria de Heredia.

In 1895, on the death of its then owner, Édouard Dumont. the so-called Pelletan heart, allegedly that of the boy Louis XVII, was given by Dumont's cousin, Paul Cottin, to Carlos, Duke of Madrid. In 1909, it passed to Jaime, Duke of Madrid, and later to his daughter, the princess Béatrice Massimo, and finally in 1938, to the princess Infanta Maria das Neves of Portugal, legitimist heir to the throne of France.

Paul Cottin was the father of Claude de Cambronne and Marie-Thérèse Cottin, future countess Lacroix de Vimeur de Rochambeau. His granddaughter Laurence de Cambronne was the editor-in-chief of Elle magazine and his great-granddaughter Camille Cottin is an actress.

== Bibliography ==
=== Forewords ===
- Foreword of Mes Inscripcions. Journal intime de Restif de la Bretonne (1780–1787)
- Foreword of Jasseron. 2000 ans d'histoire
- Foreword of Sophie de Monnier et Mirabeau d'après leur correspondance secrète inédite (1775–1789)
- Foreword of Toulon et les Anglais en 1793, d'après des documents inédits

=== Reviews ===
- Revue Rétrospective, publication fondée et dirigée par Paul Cottin de 1884 à 1904

=== Books ===
- Mémoires du sergent Bourgogne 1812–1813
- L'Angleterre devant ses alliés 1793–1814
- Manuscrits de la bibliothèque Charles de Spoelberch de Lovenjoul
- Correspondance – Documents concernant Musset
- Guide des Archives de l'Ain
- Journal Inedit du Duc de Croy, 1718–1784 V1 (introduction d'Emmanuel de Grouchy, 1906)
- Le livre du XXe, catéchisme social et politique, 1er chapitre
- Sophie de Monnier et Mirabeau d'après leur correspondance secrète inédite (1775–1789)
- Toulon et les anglais en 1793 (1897)
- Rapports Inédits du Lieutenant de Police René d'Argenson (1697–1715)
- Un Protégé de Bachaumont : Correspondance Inédite du Marquis d'Éguilles (1745–1748)
- Lorédan Larchey, (1831–1902)
- Positivisme et anarchie – Auguste Comte-Littré-Taine
- Journal inédit de Mme Moitte, femme de Jean Guillaume Moitte, statuaire, membre de l'Académie des beaux-arts, (1805–1807)
