= Artcurial =

French auction house

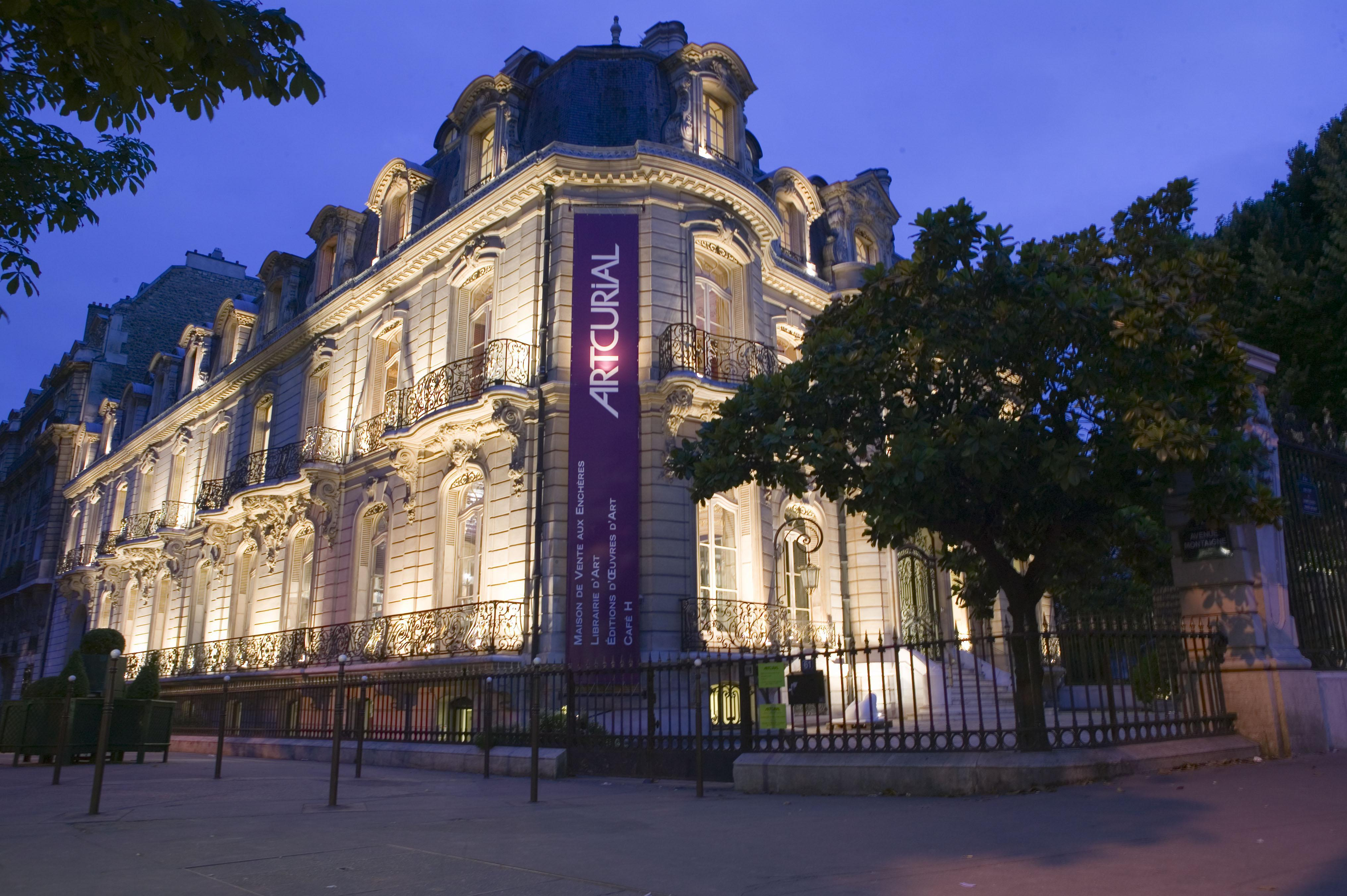
Artcurial at the Hôtel Marcel Dassault, the headquarters located at 7, Rond-Point des Champs-Élysées, in the 8th arrondissement of Paris.

Artcurial is a French auction house which has its headquarters at the historic Hôtel Marcel Dassault in Paris.

== History ==
The Artcurial art gallery was created in June 1975 by François Dalle, then CEO of L'Oréal, at 9, Avenue Matignon. Artcurial carried out activities as a gallery, a specialised bookstore, and primarily as a publisher of multiple works. From 1975 to 2002 (the date of its acquisition), Artcurial published the works of 70 artists: Arman, Sonia Delaunay, Giorgio de Chirico, Marino Di Teana, Takis, François-Xavier Lalanne, Nicolas Schöffer...

In 2001, Nicolas Orlowski acquired the Artcurial Gallery from L'Oréal. He hired auctioneers Francis Briest, Hervé Poulain and Rémy Le Fur, and established an auction house by the same name.

It is a subsidiary of the Dassault Group. Additionally, Monegasque billionaire Michel Pastor was a shareholder until his death in 2014.

As of 2014, it was the third largest auction house in Paris after Christie's and Sotheby's.

In 2022, Artcurial celebrated its 20th anniversary.

April 2023 Artcurial acquired Beurret Bailly Widmer Auktioner, an Auction house in Switzerland. Beurret Bailly was founded in 2011 by Nicolas Beurret and Emmanuel Bailly that specialized in the sale of modern and contemporary art.

=== Notable Auctions ===
In March of 2023, there was news of a botched $1 million auction after the buyer, Patrick Matthiesen, asked about the origins of the painting they purchased. The piece in question,Narcissus by Laurent de La Hyre (circa 1640), was originally purchased in an anonymous sale in London in 1929.

In August on 2023, a natural burmese stone, noted as the second-most expensive ruby to be sold in auction at $3.3 million. The stone is set in an 18-karat yellow gold setting, surrounded by 10 0.4-0.5 carats each.

On June 12, 2025, Artcurial will be handling the sale of the original manuscript of General de Gaulle's Appeal of June 18, to the French National Archives.

== Controversies ==
In 2012, the sale of an imperial Chinese seal by Artcurial sparked controversy despite protests from China and the Association for the Protection of Chinese Art in Europe (APACE). The seal was believed to have been looted from the Old Summer Palace in Beijing by Franco-British troops in 1860. Artcurial disputed this provenance, asserting that their expertise indicated the seal did not originate from the Old Summer Palace.
