= Gertrude L. Thebaud =

American fishing and racing schooner

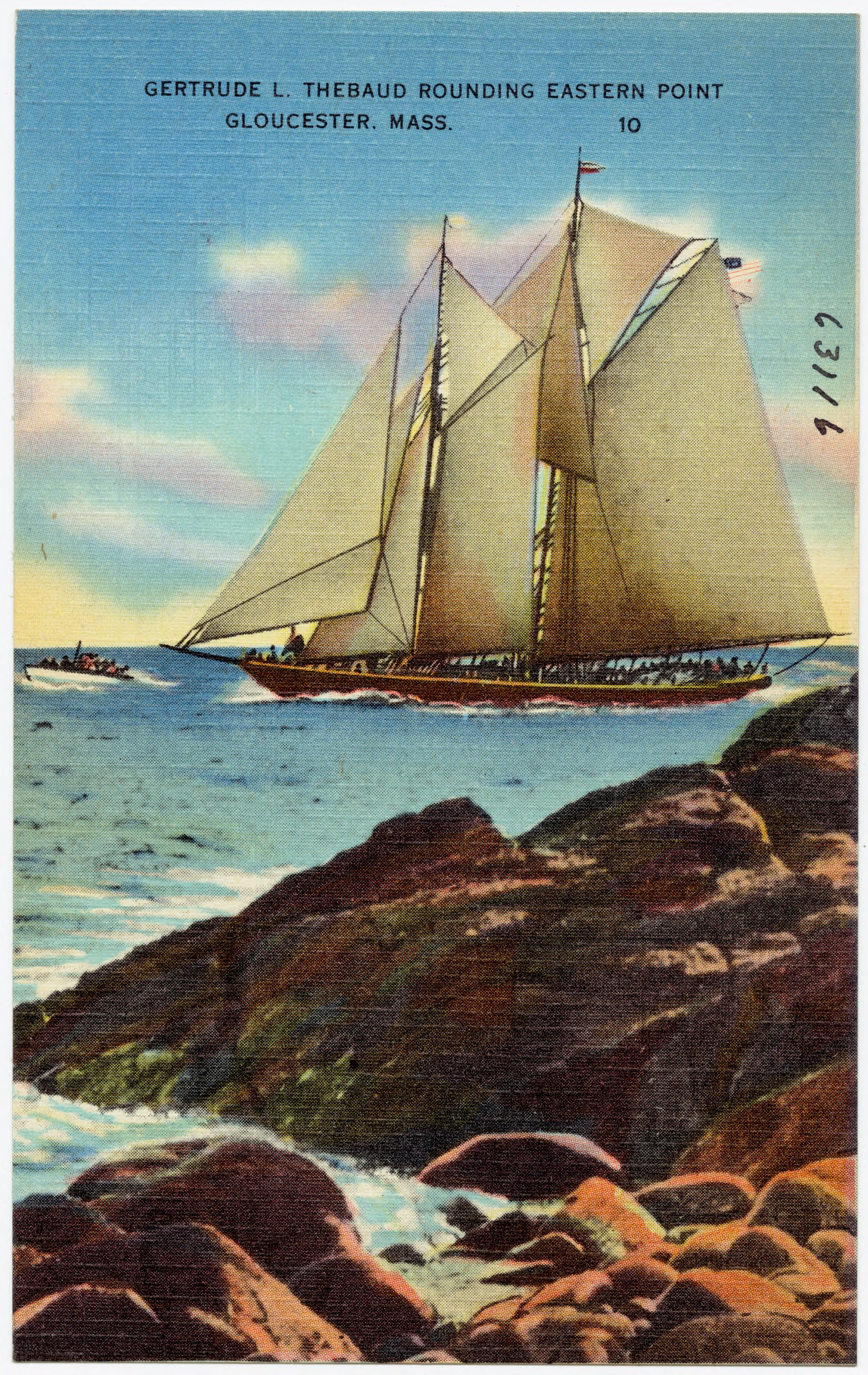
- Gertrude L. Thebaud rounding Eastern Point

History
- Name: Gertrude L. Thebaud
- Port of registry: (United States) Gloucester, Massachusetts
- Builder: Arthur D. Story
- Launched: 17 March 1930
- Fate: Sank, 1948

General characteristics
- Type: Fishing schooner
- Tonnage: 137 GRT
- Length: 41 m (134 ft 6 in) o/a; 29.9 m (98 ft 1 in) lwl
- Beam: 7.2 m (23 ft 7 in)
- Draft: 4.5 m (14 ft 9 in)
- Propulsion: Sails. 1 × 180 hp (130 kW) Fairbanks Morris diesel engine
- Sail area: 720 m^{2} (7,800 sq ft)

Gertrude L. Thebaud was an American fishing and racing schooner built and launched in Essex, Massachusetts in 1930. A celebrated racing competitor of the Canadian Bluenose, it was designed by Frank Paine and built by Arthur D. Story for Louis A. Thebaud, and named for his wife, Gertrude Thebaud. In their first meeting at Gloucester, Massachusetts in October 1930, Gertrude L. Thebaud bested Bluenose 2-0 to win the Sir Thomas Lipton International Fishing Challenge Cup. However, in 1931, two races to none, and again in 1938, three races to two, Bluenose defeated Gertrude L. Thebaud to remain the undefeated holder of the International Fisherman's Trophy. During World War II, the schooner saw service with the United States Coast Guard. The vessel sank in 1948 off the coast of Venezuela.

== Career ==
In 1930 Louis A. Thebaud, a New York insurance man and summer resident of Gloucester, Massachusetts, became interested in bringing back the international schooner races, last held in 1923. The races featured schooners from Gloucester, going up against schooners from Nova Scotia. The 1923 race had ended in acrimony and bitterness, but Thebaud thought it time to try again. He said he would put up money to build a new schooner to challenge the Canadian Bluenose. It turned out his offer was not enough to cover the costs, but Gloucester's Ben Pine put together a consortium, and the Gertrude L. Thebaud was born. A challenge was sent to Bluenose to race Gertude L. Thebaud in a series of races for the newly established Sir Thomas Lipton International Fishing Challenge Cup. The captain of Bluenose, Angus Walters, accepted the challenge. Gertude L. Thebaud was to be captained by Ben Pine, the former master of Columbia, the fishing schooner that had tied Bluenose in the last International Fisherman's Trophy race. In the first race, Gertude L. Thebaud, finished ahead of Bluenose by 15 minutes. The second race was controversial, as it was called off twice when Bluenose was in the lead. The third attempt saw Gertude L. Thebaud defeat the Canadian schooner by eight minutes. The Americans won the Lipton Cup and handed the Canadian schooner its first defeat in competitive racing.

With Bluenose's loss, the Americans saw their chance at returning the International Fisherman's Trophy to the United States. They issued a challenge for the trophy to Bluenose in a series of races to be sailed off Halifax, Nova Scotia in October 1931. The first race, which Bluenose won, ran overlong and did not count. The second attempt saw Bluenose win again, by 32 minutes. The second race was won by Bluenose again, this time by only 12 minutes, keeping the International Fisherman's Trophy in Canadian hands.

In 1933, Gertrude L. Thebaud was invited to the World Fair in Chicago, Illinois. There, along with Bluenose, the vessel welcomed aboard visitors. The schooner returned to Gloucester that year with renewed interest in a rematch with Bluenose. In 1937, a challenge was sent to Bluenose to race for the International Fisherman's Trophy. However, the Canadian ship was no longer a pure sailing ship as the vessel had a diesel engine installed in 1936 and her owners did not have the financial ability to return her to that state. American investors offset some of the costs and Bluenose sailed for Massachusetts in 1938.

The 1938 competition for the International Fisherman's Trophy between Gertrude L. Thebaud and Bluenose was different than previous versions. The competition was a best-of-five instead of a best-of-three and all the races would be sailed off Massachusetts. The first race, sailed off Boston on 9 October 1938 was won by Gertrude L. Thebaud. The second race, sailed off Gloucester, was won by Bluenose. However, controversy over Bluenose's ballast and waterline length led the Canadians to perform modifications to their ship before the next race could be sailed.

The third race, sailed off Gloucester, was won by Bluenose by more than six minutes. During the fourth race off Boston, Bluenose suffered a 12-meter (39 ft) tear in its sail and the vessel's fore topmast snapped, slowing the ship considerably. Gertude L. Thebaud won the fourth race, setting up the winner-takes-all fifth race off Gloucester. Gertude L. Thebaud lost the fifth race and the cup to Bluenose. This was the last race between North Atlantic sail-driven fishing schooners.

During World War II, the schooner was commissioned into the United States Coast Guard on 24 December 1942 with the hull identification number WPYc 386. After brief service, the vessel was decommissioned on 10 February 1944 and returned to its owners. Gertude L. Thebaud saw continued service as a fishing vessel until 6 February 1948, when the schooner sank off the coast of La Guaira, Venezuela.
