= USS James K. Paulding =

Clemson-class destroyer

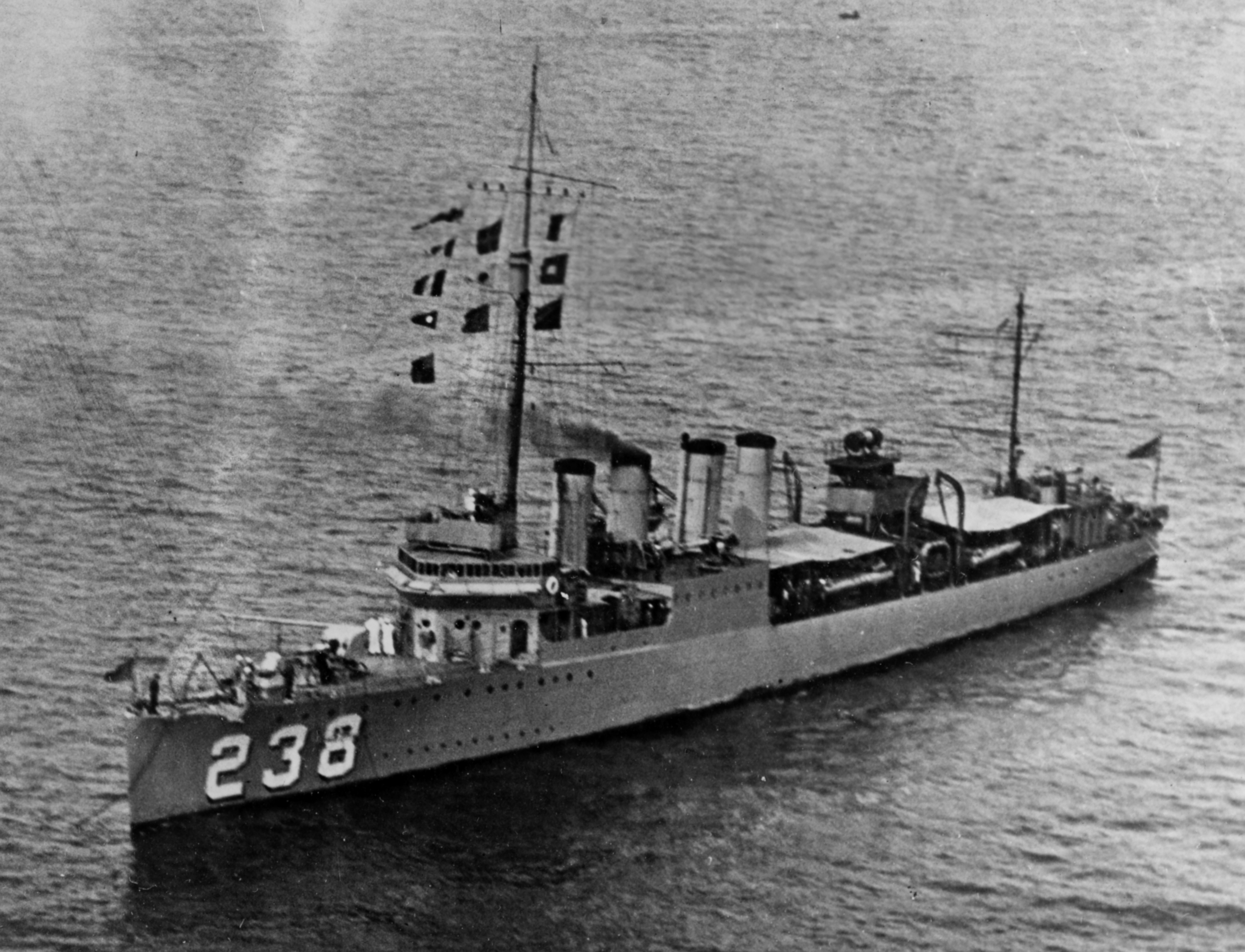
- USS James K. Paulding (DD-238) at anchor in the early 1920s

History

United States
- Namesake: James Kirke Paulding
- Builder: New York Shipbuilding
- Laid down: 31 July 1918
- Launched: 20 April 1920
- Commissioned: 29 November 1920
- Decommissioned: 10 February 1931
- Stricken: 25 January 1937
- Fate: Sold for scrap, 16 March 1939

General characteristics
- Class & type: Clemson-class destroyer
- Displacement: 1,190 tons
- Length: 314 feet 5 inches (95,830 mm)
- Beam: 31 feet 8 inches (9,650 mm)
- Draft: 9 feet 3 inches (2,820 mm)
- Propulsion: 26,500 shp (20 MW); geared turbines, 2 screws
- Speed: 35 knots (65 km/h)
- Range: 4,900 nautical miles (9,100 kilometres); @ 15 kt
- Complement: 101 officers and enlisted
- Armament: 4 x 4 in (100 mm) guns, 1 x 3 in (76 mm) gun, 2 x .30 cal. (7.62 mm), 12 x 21 inch (533 mm) tt.

USS James K. Paulding (DD-238) was a Clemson-class destroyer in the United States Navy during the period between World War I and World War II. She was named for former Secretary of the Navy James Kirke Paulding.

== History ==
James K. Paulding was laid down 31 July 1918 and launched 20 April 1920 by New York Shipbuilding Corporation; sponsored by Miss Mary Hubbard Paulding, great granddaughter of James K. Paulding; and commissioned 29 November 1920.

After shakedown James K. Paulding was assigned to the Atlantic Fleet, and commenced tactical exercises with destroyer squadrons along the coast. She arrived at Newport, Rhode Island, 31 May 1921 for summer maneuvers and reserve training. Later that year she cruised to Charleston, South Carolina, for squadron exercises, and continued operations there until late winter 1922.

James K. Paulding joined the Scouting Fleet January 1923 and throughout the year engaged in tactical war problems designed to maintain the fleet in the best possible fighting condition. She continued these operations in addition to reserve training until she sailed in February 1925 to San Diego, California for war problems in the Pacific. Upon her return to Newport 31 August, she resumed her duties with the Scouting Fleet. While engaging in gunnery exercises in Caribbean waters November 1926, James K. Paulding sailed to Nicaragua to protect American interests in the wake of political turmoil in that country. During March and April 1927 she remained off Nicaragua to prevent any smuggling of arms.

For the remainder of her career James K. Paulding continued reserve training and tactical exercises in the Atlantic and Caribbean. During her service with the Navy she conducted peacekeeping operations, reserve training, and fleet problems all to maintain the United States' seapower, and provided a base upon which more powerful naval forces were built.

== Fate ==
The destroyer arrived at The Philadelphia Navy Yard 31 October 1930, and decommissioned there 10 February 1931. She was reduced to a hulk 28 December 1936 in accordance with the provisions of the London treaty for the limitation and reduction of naval armament, scrapped, and struck from the Navy List 25 January 1937.

As of 2005, no other ship of the US Navy has been named James K. Paulding. USS Paulding (DD-22) was named for Hiram Paulding.
