= Leo Hewlett Thebaud =

USNavy admiral

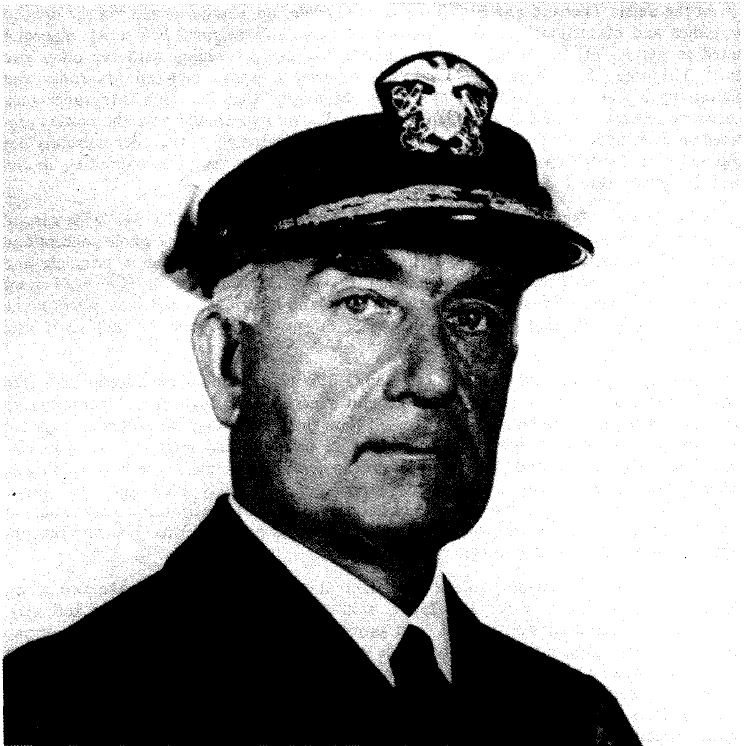
- Born: Leo Hewlett Thébaud; February 15, 1890; Madison, New Jersey, US
- Died: April 18, 1980 (aged 90); Bethesda, Maryland, US
- Burial place: United States Naval Academy Cemetery
- Military career
- Allegiance: United States of America
- Branch: United States Navy
- Service years: 1913–1952
- Rank: Vice Admiral
- Nickname: Bud
- Commands: Commandant, First Naval District; Commander, Cruiser Division Ten; USS Boise (1943); Commander, United States Escort Control; Commander, Destroyer Squadron Twenty-Seven; Commander, Destroyer Squadron Thirteen; USS Clark (1936-1938); USS James K. Paulding (1926?-1928); USS Bainbridge (1921-1922); USS Herndon (1920-1921); USS Paul Jones (1918-1919)
- Conflicts: World War I Second Nicaraguan Campaign; World War II
- Awards: Navy Cross; Legion of Merit (4); Navy Commendation Medal; Order of the British Empire; French Legion of Honour; Czechoslovak Order of Merit; Order of Yun Hui of the Republic of China.

Leo Hewlett Thebaud (February 15, 1890 – April 18, 1980) was an admiral of the United States Navy.

== Early life ==
Thebaud was born in Madison, New Jersey, on February 15, 1890, to Edward Vincent (1824-1900) and Elizabeth Hewlett Scudder (1869-1952) Thebaud. His grandfathers were Edward Thebaud and Townsend Scudder. Growing up, he attended the Berkeley Institute in New York City, the Hodder School in England, the Chestnut Hill Academy in Pennsylvania, and graduated from the United States Naval Academy, class of 1913. On October 1, 1921, he married the former Eleanor Laurie McCawley (May 5, 1899 - Mar. 8, 1980) from Haverford, Pennsylvania.

== World War I and interwar era ==
Following graduation, Thebaud was assigned to USS Wyoming, where he served until 1917. He then served as Commanding Officer of the USS Paul Jones in escort duties in the Atlantic. While commanding Paul Jones, Thebaud was awarded the Navy Cross for rescuing the crew of USS Henderson. Later destroyer duty included service aboard USS Wickes, USS DeLong, USS Dickerson, and commands of the USS Herndon and USS Bainbridge.

Ashore he had duty with the Office of the Chief of Naval Operations, followed by service at the Naval Academy. While there, he was officially designated by then Naval Academy Superintendent Henry B. Wilson to compile leadership tips and hints to guide Naval Academy Graduates in the Surface Fleet following their graduation. The book, published by the U.S. Naval Institute in 1924, was the first leadership text used by the Naval Academy. Its final (fourth) edition was again compiled by Thebaud while stationed at the Academy in 1939, and remained a popular leadership guide throughout the Navy until replaced in 1949.

After serving aboard USS Pennsylvania and USS Gilmer, he then took command of USS James K. Paulding, aboard which he participated in the Second Nicaraguan Campaign. He later served as Executive Officer of the Presidential yacht USS Mayflower during President Herbert Hoover's administration, followed by service as First Lieutenant aboard USS Arkansas. Thebaud was then appointed Flag Aide to Rear Admiral Wat Tyler Cluverius, Jr., Commander Cruiser Division Four, Scouting Force, United States Fleet. Beginning in 1933, he served tours as Assistant Naval Attaché in Paris, Madrid and Lisbon. Returning to the United States, he took command of the destroyer USS Clark during her fitting out and commissioning. Following Clark, he returned to the Naval Academy for another tour. Thebaud was then appointed Commander Destroyer Squadron Twenty-Seven, and subsequently took over Destroyer Squadron Thirteen.

== World War II and postwar service ==
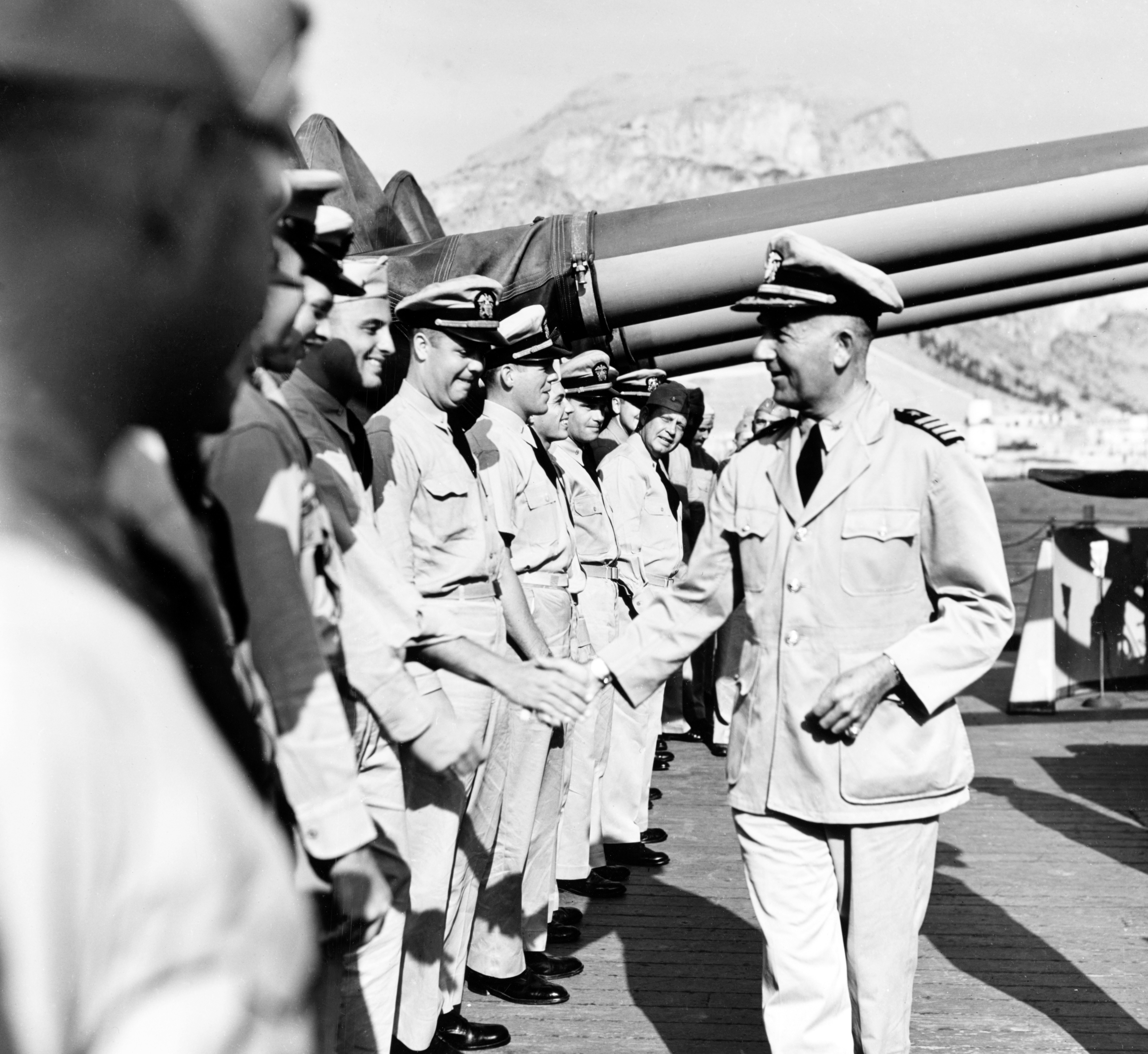
Thebaud shaking hands with the officers of USS Boise after being relieved of command at Palermo, Italy (September 25, 1943)

Upon the United States' entry into World War II, Thebaud once again found himself on escort duty in the North Atlantic. In October 1942, as Commander of Destroyer Squadron Thirteen, he served in tactical control of the largest multi-country convoy escort to date, with a US force of five destroyers, a British force of two destroyers and two corvettes, a Canadian force of one destroyer and seven corvettes, and one Free French corvette. He later served as Commander, United States Escort Control and Senior Officer Present Afloat, Derry, Northern Ireland, supporting convoy operations. Afterward, in command of the cruiser USS Boise in the Mediterranean, Thebaud was awarded the Legion of Merit with Combat "V" and the Army Bronze Oak Leaf Cluster for supporting for the Amphibious Battle of Gela during the Invasion of Sicily. He also received the Legion of Merit for supporting the Italian mainland landings at Salerno (12–19 September). He received a fourth Legion of Merit while commanding Cruiser Division Ten in the Pacific Theater, during occupation of the Mariana Islands, strikes against the Bonin Islands and the Battle of the Philippine Sea. Following service as the Director of Naval Intelligence (October 1944 - September 1945), he then served as Naval Attaché in Paris at the request of Fleet Admiral Ernest J. King. Subsequently, he was named Inspector General of the Navy (July 1947 - June 1949) and then Commandant of the First Naval District (February 1949 - February 1952). Additional decorations received by Thebaud include the Navy Commendation Medal, the Order of the British Empire (CBE), the French Legion of Honour, the Czechoslovak Order of Merit, and the Order of Yun Hui of the Republic of China. Thebaud was transferred to the retired list in 1952 and died on April 18, 1980, in Bethesda, Maryland. He and his wife are buried at the United States Naval Academy Cemetery in Annapolis, Maryland.
