= Thebaud Brothers =

Thebaud Brothers was an American commission house located in New York City. The company was established around 1793 by Joseph Thebaud, who hailed from France and served as an agent for the French East India Company. According to The New York Times, it was among the largest traders with Mexico and Central America in the city. From 1862 until its eventual collapse in 1907, Thebaud Brothers held a prominent position as a major importer of Henequen fiber from Mexico into the United States. Its failure was connected to another company going out of business, the E. Escalante & Son commission house in the Yucatán.

== See also ==
- Divine Caste
- Nicolás Cámara Vales
- Caroline Rose Foster
