= François Picard-Destelan =

French Navy admiral

- Born: 20 April 1909; British Hong Kong
- Died: January 12, 1983 (aged 73)
- Occupation: Vice- Admiral
- Spouse: Geneviève Bertheau de Chazal (1912-1962)
- Children: Christiane, Ghislaine, Bernadette, Nicole & Guy

François Picard-Destelan (20 April 1909 in British Hong Kong – 12 January 1983 in Criquetot-l'Esneval) was a French admiral of the French Navy.

== Biography ==
He joined the French Navy in 1928, in Cherbourg. Promoted to Lieutenant de vaisseau in 1937, he served as an interpreter in 1942, during World War II. He served as Corvette captain in 1945 on the Richelieu-class battleship and Frigate captain in 1948. He was promoted to capitaine de vaisseau in 1954, Rear admiral in 1959 and Vice admiral from 1960 and 1967. He commanded the fleet of the Pacific.

== Awards ==
- Chevalier de la Légion d'Honneur
- Officier de la Légion d'Honneur
- Commandeur de la Légion d'honneur
- Croix de Guerre
