= Darius Paul Dassault =

French general (1882–1969)

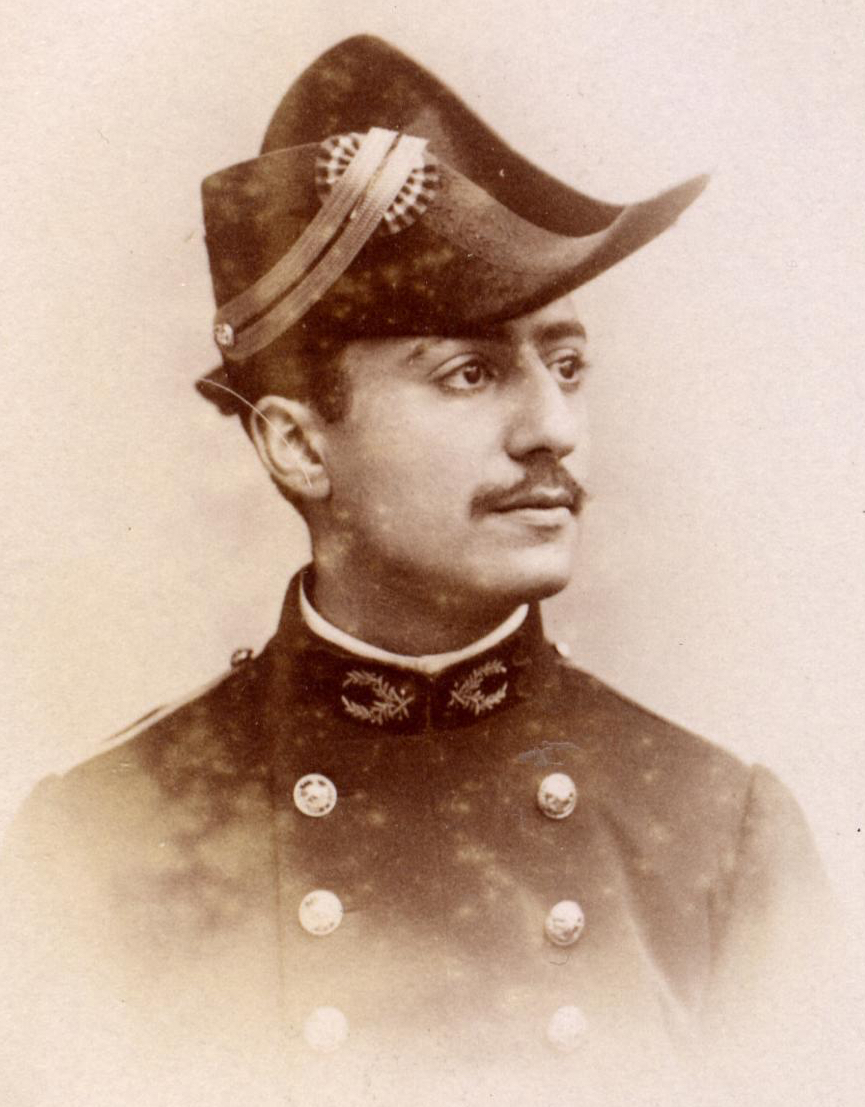
Darius Paul Bloch-Dassault

Darius Paul Dassault (né Bloch; 13 January 1882 – 3 May 1969) was a French general and member of the French Resistance[1], and a recipient of the grand-croix de la Légion d'honneur, a military medal.

After graduating from the École Polytechnique in 1901, Dassault served an artillery officer. He fought in World War on the French front and later with the Army of the Orient. He was cited six times and made a Knight of the Legion of Honour in 1916.

After the Battle of France and the defeat in June 1940, Dassault joined the Resistance in December 1941. In early 1944, he was appointed clandestine military governor of Paris, and, on August 25, the day of the liberation of Paris, General de Gaulle appointed him Grand Chancellor of the National Order of the Legion of Honour, a post he held until 1954. On December 31, 1947, he was promoted to General of the Army (2nd section). He also resumed his research and scientific publications on chemical warfare, air ballistics, and atomic energy, which led to his election to the French Academy of Sciences in 1953.

He was the older brother by ten years of the industrialist Marcel Dassault.

== Early life and career ==
Darius Paul Bloch was born on January 13, 1882, in Paris. He was the son of Adolphe Bloch, a medical doctor, and Noémie Allatini. Both of his parents were of Jewish descent; his father was of Alsatian Jewish origin, while his mother belonged to the prominent Allatini family of Sephardic Jewish ancestry from Thessaloniki.

After graduating from the École Polytechnique in 1901, he became a captain (capitaine écuyer, in French) at the Military School for Artillery in Fontainebleau in 1906.

=== World War I ===
He was mobilized in August 1914 and served in several heavy artillery regiments on the French front. In February 1917, he was assigned to the French Army of the Orient (Balkan Front) and served on the staff of the artillery command. He returned to France in November 1917 and directed training at the heavy artillery organization center in Troyes.

In May 1918, with tanks first being used on the battlefield, Bloch requested and obtained command of a tank battalion, with which he saw combat in major battles. He ended the war with the rank of artillery captain. He was cited six times and made a knight of the Legion of Honour.

=== Interwar Period ===
An armaments specialist, he was head of the technical cabinet of the War Minister, André Maginot, in 1931. On March 20, 1933, he became the youngest brigadier general in the French army. In 1935, he was deputy chief of the General Staff. He was promoted to major general on March 23, 1936, and then to lieutenant general on December 19, 1938.

=== World War II ===
Upon mobilization in September 1939, he commanded the 5th Army Corps.

In January 1940, he was commander of anti-aircraft artillery (DCA) in metropolitan France, and then, from October 1940, inspector of ground anti-aircraft formations in metropolitan France and North Africa. He retired in January 1942.

During the German occupation, he joined the Resistance in December 1941 under the pseudonyms Rapp and Chardasso. He was arrested during the battle for the liberation of Paris, but managed to escape. Upon the liberation of Paris in August 1944, he was appointed Military Governor of Paris on August 20th and then, on August 25th, Grand Chancellor of the Legion of Honour by General de Gaulle, who was impressed by his writings on tanks. He held this position until 1954.

He was promoted to the rank of Grand Officer of the Legion of Honour under the name Bloch dit Dassault on May 17, 1945, and then was made a Grand Cross on May 29, 1946.

=== Post-war period ===
On December 31, 1947, he was promoted to General of the Army.

While serving as Grand Chancellor of the Legion of Honor, General Dassault presided over and participated in the work of the National Defense Scientific Committee, which he had been tasked with creating.

In 1949, he and his brother, Marcel, both changed their names to Dassault in remembrance of Darius-Paul’s code name in the Resistance.

On June 27, 1951, he was awarded the Military Medal, the highest distinction for a general.

He also represented the Ministry of National Defense at the Atomic Energy Commission and became a member of the French Academy of Sciences on June 15, 1953.

== Death ==
He died in Paris on May 30, 1969, and was buried in Paris at Père-Lachaise Cemetery. He was laid to rest alongside his brother, René Georges Bloch, a surgeon, who died in Auschwitz in 1942.

== Timeline of military career ==
- 20 March 1933 : Rank of brigade general (général de brigade)
- 23 March 1936 : Rank of division general (général de division)
- 19 December 1938 : Rank of corps general (général de corps d’armée)
- 1940 : Commander of Anti-Aircraft Artillery
- 1941–1944 : Resistant under the name Rapp, then Chardasso
- 1944 : First Free French Military Governor of Paris.
- 31 December 1947 : Rank of army general (général d'armée)

== Honours ==
- Grand Cross of the Légion d’honneur (29 June 1946; Grand Officer: 17 May 1945; Commander: 27 December 1934; Officer: 4 February 1921; Knight: 16 December 1916)
- Médaille militaire – 27 June 1951
- Croix de guerre 1914–1918 with 3 palms and 3 stars
- Croix de guerre 1939–1945
- Médaille de la Résistance, 1951
- Allied Victory Medal 1914–1918
- Médaille commémorative de la guerre 1914–1918
- Knight of the Order of Léopold (Belgium)
- Croix de guerre 1914-1918 (Belgium)
- Commander's Cross with Star of the Order of Polonia Restituta (16 July 1946, Poland)
