= Herrick Chapman =

American historian

- Scientific career
- Fields: History
- Workplaces: New York University

Herrick Chapman is a prominent historian of France. Since 1992 he has been employed at New York University, where he is Professor of History in the Department of History and Institute of French Studies. Professor Chapman was educated at the University of California, Berkeley, and Princeton University.

== Awards and honours ==
He has been the recipient of a number of awards and honours:

- Nancy Lyman Roelker Mentorship Award, conferred by the American Historical Association, 2021.
- Chevalier dans l’Ordre des Palmes Académiques, conferred by the French Government, 2006.
- Remarque Fellow, Remarque Institute, New York University, spring semester 2006.
- German Marshall Fund of the United States, Research Fellowship, 1993–94.
- National Endowment for the Humanities, Research Fellowship, 1993–94.
- Maurice Falk Fellowship in the Humanities, Carnegie Mellon University, spring 1992.
- Faculty Development Grant for Research, Carnegie Mellon University, 1987 and 1991.
- American Council of Learned Societies, post-doctoral research fellowship for recent recipients of the Ph.D., 1985–86.
- National Fellow, Hoover Institution of War, Revolution and Peace, Stanford University, 1985–86.
- Research Fellow, Stanford Humanities Center, 1985-86 (declined).
- International Doctoral Research Fellowship, Social Science Research Council, for dissertation research and writing, 1979–81.
- Fulbright-Hays Doctoral Fellowship, for dissertation research, 1979–80.
- Honorary Chancellor's Traveling Fellowship, University of California, Berkeley, for dissertation research, 1979.
- Danforth Postbaccalaureate Fellowship, 1977–1981.
- Senior Thesis Prize, Woodrow Wilson School of Public and International Affairs, Princeton University, 1971.

== Publications ==
- State Capitalism and Working-Class Radicalism in the French Aircraft Industry. Berkeley: University of California Press, 1991.
- European Society in Upheaval: Social History Since 1700, Third Edition, co-authored with Peter N. Stearns. New York: MacMillan, 1992.
- The Social Construction of Democracy, 1870-1990, co-edited with George Reid Andrews. New York: New York University Press. London: Macmillan Ltd. 1995.
- A Century of Organized Labor in France: A Union Movement for the Twenty-First Century? co-edited with Mark Kesselman and Martin Schain. New York: St. Martin's Press, 1998.
- Race in France: Interdisciplinary Perspectives on the Politics of Difference, co-edited with Laura L. Frader. New York: Berghahn Books, 2004.
- L’Aéronautique: Salariés et patrons d’une industrie française, 1928-1950. Rennes: Presses Universitaires de Rennes, 2011.
- France's Long Reconstruction: In Search of the Modern Republic. Cambridge, MA: Harvard University Press, 2018.
- La longue reconstruction de la France: À la recherche de la république moderne. Paris: Presses de Sciences Po, 2021.
