= Marcel Dassault =

French aircraft industrialist (1892–1986)

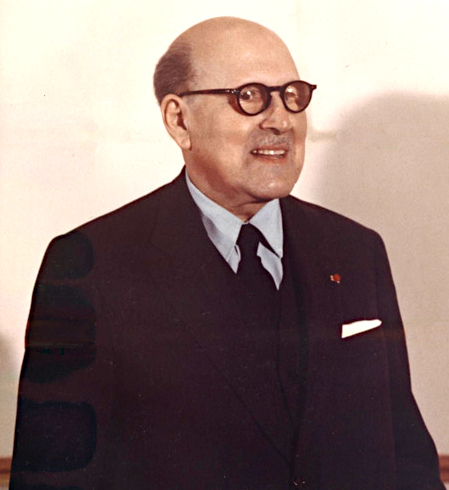
- Born: Marcel Ferdinand Bloch; 23 January 1892; 9th arrondissement of Paris, France
- Died: 17 April 1986 (aged 94); Neuilly-sur-Seine, France
- Resting place: Passy Cemetery, Paris
- Education: Lycée Condorcet; Breguet School; Supaéro
- Occupations: Engineer and industrialist
- Known for: Founder of the Dassault Aviation
- Spouse: Madeleine Minckès
- Children: Claude Dassault; Serge Dassault
- Relatives: Darius Paul Dassault (brother)
- Awards: Daniel Guggenheim Medal (1976)

Marcel Dassault (French pronunciation: [maʁsɛl daso]; born Marcel Ferdinand Bloch; 23 January 1892 – 17 April 1986) was a French engineer and industrialist who spent his career in aircraft manufacturing. He was also involved in politics, serving intermittently over more than three decades in both houses of the French Parliament from 1951 until his death in 1986.

== Early life and education ==
Born on 23 January 1892 in Paris, as the youngest of the four children of Adolphe Bloch, a doctor, and his wife Noémie Allatini. His parents were Jewish.

He attended the Lycée Condorcet in Paris. After studies in electrical engineering, he graduated from the Breguet School and Supaéro. At the latter school, Bloch was classmates with a Russian student named Mikhail Gurevich, who would later become instrumental in the creation of the MiG aircraft series. He was imprisoned in the Buchenwald concentration camp during World War II for refusing to collaborate with the Nazi regime. He survived the camp's liberation in 1945

== Career ==
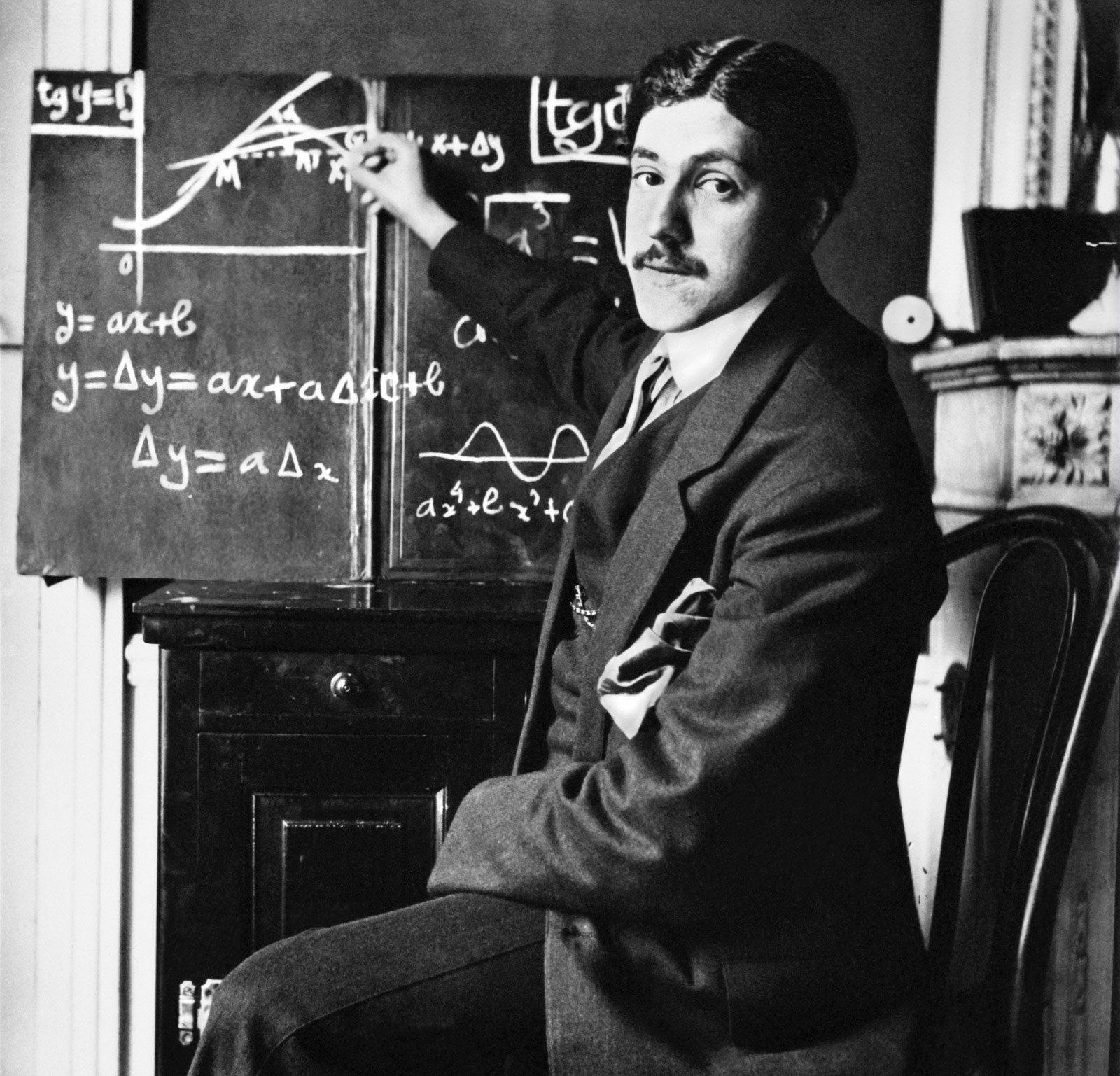
Marcel Bloch, c. 1912

Bloch worked at the French Aeronautics Research Laboratory at Chalais-Meudon during World War I and invented a type of aircraft propeller subsequently used by the French army during the conflict. In 1916, with Henry Potez and Louis Coroller, he formed a company, the Société d'Études Aéronautiques, to produce the SEA series of fighters.

In 1928, Bloch founded the aircraft company Société des Avions Marcel Bloch, which produced its first aircraft in 1930. In 1935, Bloch and Henry Potez entered into an agreement to buy Société Aérienne Bordelaise (SAB). In 1936, the company was nationalized as the Société Nationale de Constructions Aéronautiques du Sud Ouest (SNCASO). Bloch agreed to become the delegated administrator of the Minister for Air.

During the occupation of France by Nazi Germany during World War II, France's aviation industry was virtually disbanded, other than the compulsory manufacturing, assembly, and servicing of German designs. In October 1940, Bloch refused to collaborate with the German occupiers at Bordeaux-Aéronautique and was imprisoned by the Vichy government.

In 1944, the Nazis deported Bloch to the Buchenwald concentration camp, as punishment for refusing to co-operate with their regime. He was tortured, beaten, and held in solitary confinement. In the meantime, his wife was interned near Paris. Bloch was detained at Buchenwald until it was liberated on 11 April 1945. By the time of his return to Paris, he was disabled to such an extent that he could barely walk. He was advised by his doctors to settle his affairs, as they did not expect him to recover his health.

After the war, he changed his name from Bloch to Bloch-Dassault and in 1949 to Dassault. This name derived from 'Chardasso', the nom de guerre used by his brother, General Darius Paul Bloch, when he served in the French Resistance. The pseudonym was a play on char d'assaut, French for "assault tank". (Note: Char d'assault colloquially means "battle tank" in French, but a word-for-word translation would be "assault wagon". D'assault simply means "for assault" or "for attack".) In 1971, Dassault acquired Breguet Aviation, forming Avions Marcel Dassault–Breguet Aviation (AMD–BA).

== Personal life ==
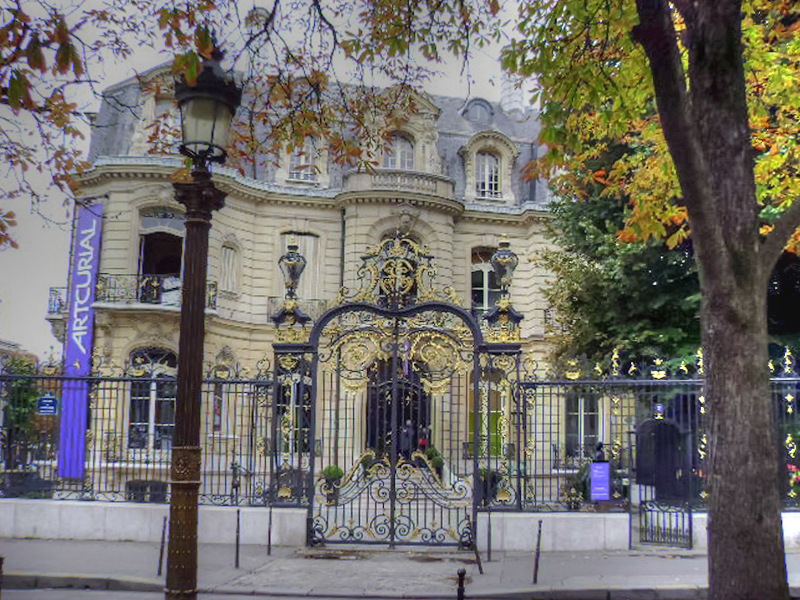
Hôtel Marcel Dassault in Paris

In 1919, Bloch married Madeleine Minckès, the daughter of a wealthy Jewish family of furniture dealers. They had two sons, Claude and Serge. After changing his name to Dassault, he converted to the Roman Catholic Church in 1950.

In July 1952, Dassault acquired the Paris landmark buildings now known as Hôtel Marcel Dassault, dating from 1844, at nos. 7 and 9 rond-point des Champs-Élysées (at the corner of the avenue des Champs-Élysées and avenue Montaigne), from the Sabatier d'Espeyran family. The building at no. 7 has been used since 2002 by the auction house Artcurial, which had further alterations made under the direction of architect Jean-Michel Wilmotte. While no. 7 has been sold, no. 9 is still used by the Groupe Industriel Marcel Dassault.

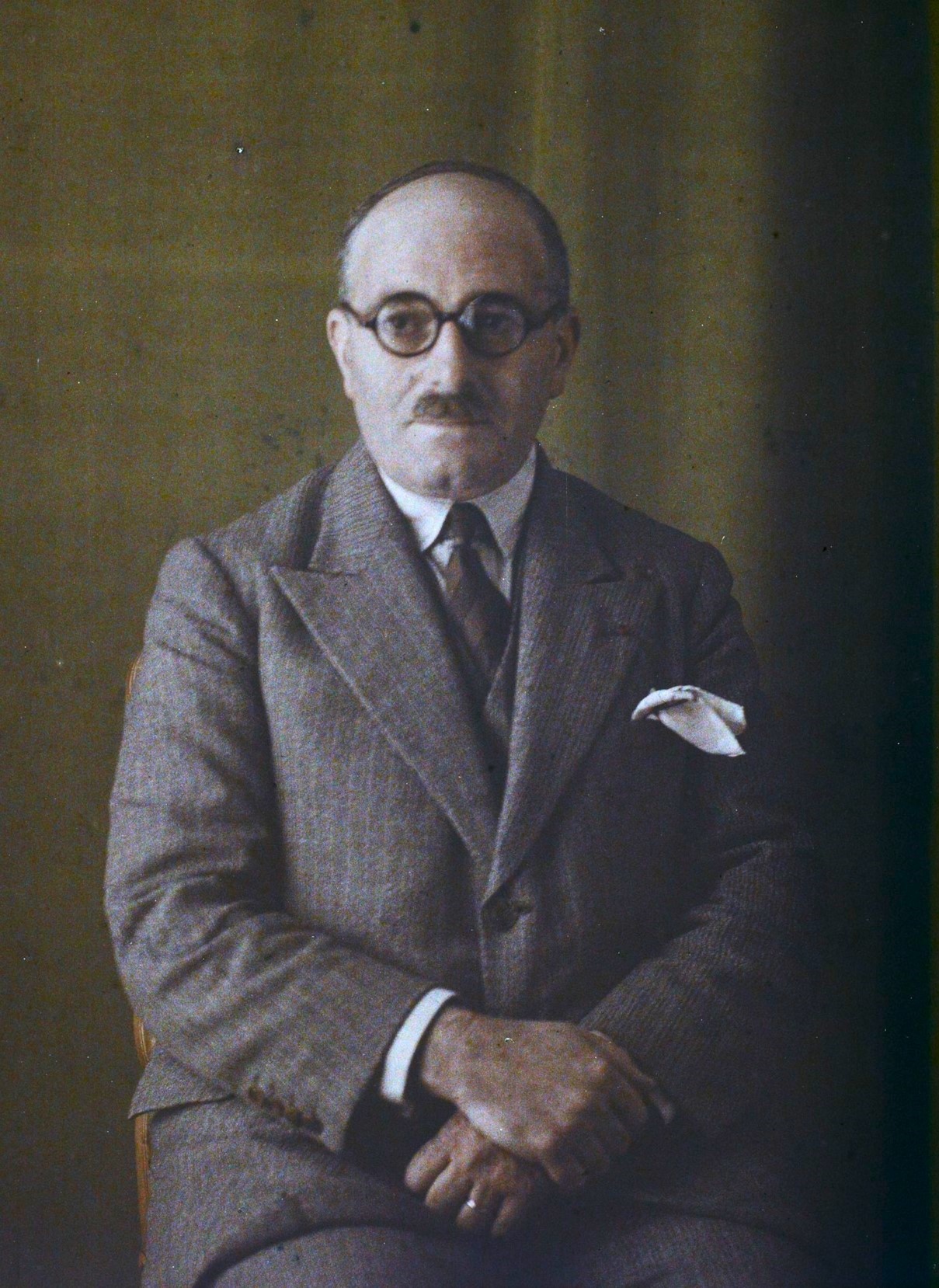
Autochrome by Georges Chevalier, 1930

In 1973, Dassault was inducted into the International Air & Space Hall of Fame.

== Death and legacy ==
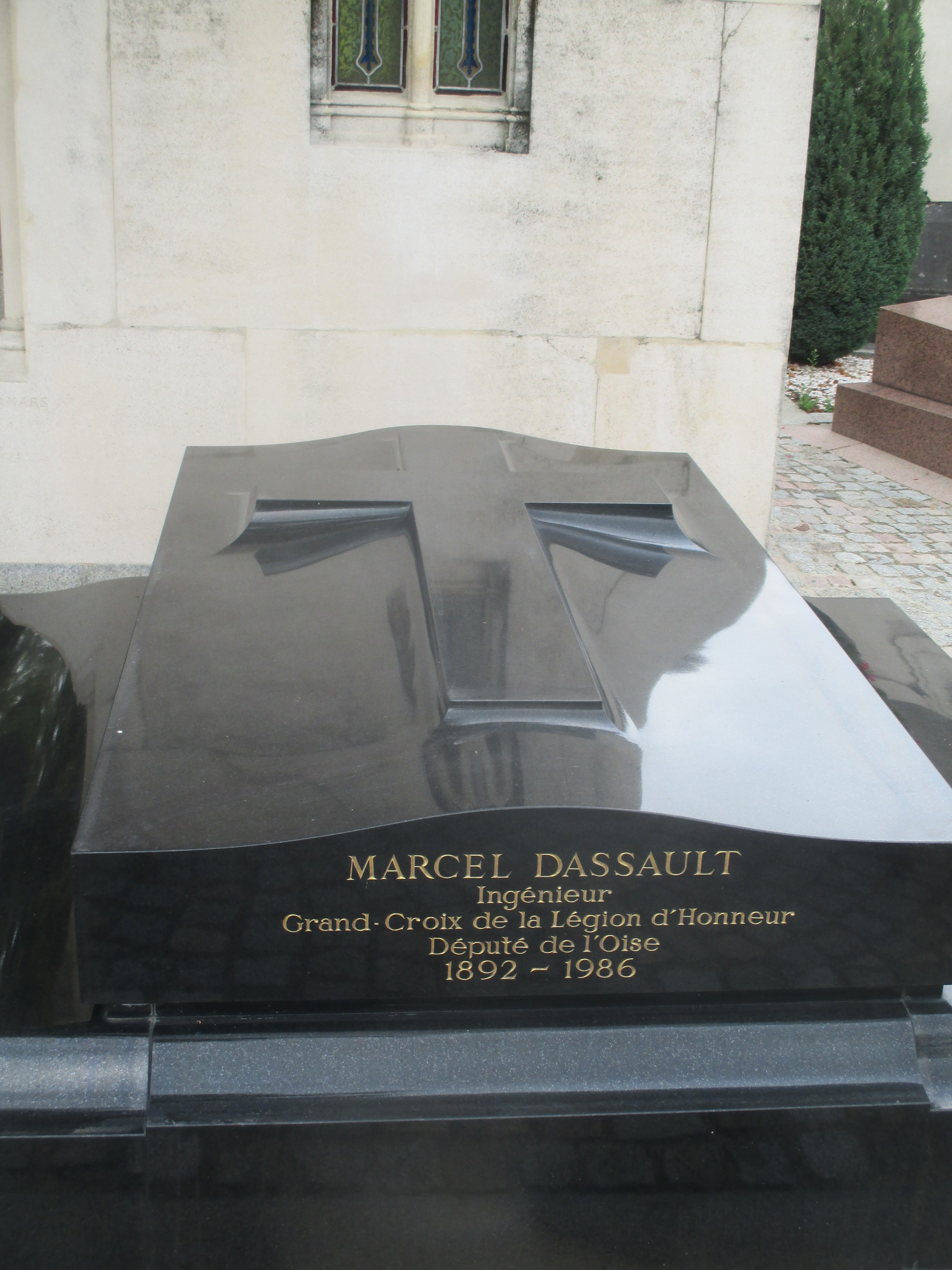
Grave of Marcel Dassault in Paris

Dassault died at Neuilly-sur-Seine in 1986 and was buried at the Passy Cemetery in the 16th arrondissement of Paris.

Serge Dassault, Marcel's younger son, became CEO of Avions Marcel Dassault, which was restructured as Groupe Industriel Marcel Dassault, reflecting its broader interests. In 1990, the aviation division was renamed Dassault Aviation.

In 1991, the rond-point des Champs-Elysées in Paris was renamed the rond-point des Champs-Elysées-Marcel-Dassault in his honour.

== In popular culture ==
In The Adventures of Tintin book Flight 714 to Sydney, Dassault is parodied as the aircraft construction tycoon Laszlo Carreidas – "the millionaire who never laughs" – who offers Tintin, Captain Haddock and Professor Calculus his personal jet, the Carreidas 160, to travel to Sydney.

== Honors and awards ==
- Grand Cross of the Order of Legion of Honour
- Croix de guerre 1939-1945

== See also ==
- Vathaire affair, 1970s French politico-financial scandal
