= Francis Bernard (engineer) =

French engineer (born 1940)

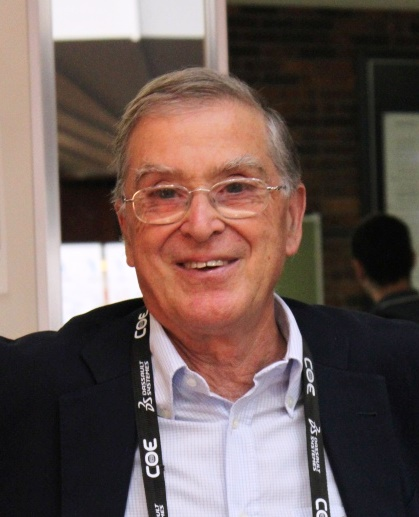
- Born: 1940 (age 85–86); Hanoi, French Indochina
- Education: M.S. (Aerospace engineering), Institut Supérieur de l'Aéronautique et de l'Espace
- Occupation: Executive adviser to startups
- Known for: Developer of CATIA, co-founder of Dassault Systèmes
- Title: First general manager of Dassault Systèmes

Francis Bernard (born 1940) is a French engineer. In the 1970s, he initiated CAD/CAM developments at Dassault Aviation. They led to CATIA 3D, which was made available worldwide after he co-founded Dassault Systèmes in 1981.

== Early life and education ==
Francis Bernard was born in Hanoi in 1940, still part of French Indochina, today Vietnam. His father was an engineer in the coalmines of northern Vietnam. He attended primary school in Haiphong and Dalat. In 1952, his family returned to France and settled in Paris. He joined the Janson-de-Sailly high school, following the course of preparatory classes before being accepted at Institut Supérieur de l'Aéronautique et de l'Espace (Supaero), a French university specialising in aerospace engineering, in 1965.

After his military service, he joined Dassault Aviation's technical division headed by Jean Cabrière, and within it the Advanced Design Department headed by Pierre Bohn in charge of aerodynamics, flight quality and performance optimisation. He specialised in theoretical aerodynamics and quickly got involved in software development of computer-aided design (CAD) and computer-aided manufacturing (CAM) programs.

== Professional career ==
=== From GEOVA to DRAPO: beginnings of CAD at Dassault Aviation (1967-1981) ===
Bernard's career began developing calculation tools for aerodynamic optimization. Several military aircraft programmes were then underway, including the Alpha Jet, or the Mirage III successors and the civilian aircraft programs Mercure or Falcon. Heading a 5 to 6 people team, Francis Bernard developed three-dimensional CAD tools to define wind tunnel models with improved accuracy, as well as numerical control programs for machining structural parts. GEOVA (Génération et Exploitation par Ordinateur des Volumes d’Avions, meaning Computer aided Generation and Operation of Aircraft Volumes) was an integration of various software tools around a single database. The main objective was to prevent software developments diverging by structuring them around their common data.

For a decade, from 1967 to 1977, he developed GEOVA, a comprehensive set of 3D CAD applications. GEOVA evolved to benefit from many computer technological innovations, such as interactive graphics terminals replacing alphanumeric terminals tools, and to interface with the computer numerical control (CNC) machines. As for the other aircraft manufacturers, these were internal developments defined according to very specific and urgent requirements. The level of integration tended to be low. This was the time of mainframes and punched cards, requiring a high level of software applications expertise. User friendliness was not feasible yet. Design offices had to submit calculation works to Bernard's team, which was responsible for both software development and operation.

=== Birth of CATIA ===
While 3D gave excellent results for wind tunnel models or surface optimization, 2D remained the key modeling practice in design offices where dozens of drawing boards were aligned in large open spaces. In the 1970s, the CAD offers available on the market were mainly aimed at draftsmen. In 1974, Dassault Aviation purchased licences for CADAM ('Computer Augmented Design And Manufacturing'), Lockheed's interactive drawing application, aimed at replacing drawing boards. Francis Bernard developed interfaces between GEOVA and CADAM as well as 2.5D improvements on CADAM. The latter aimed at modeling and machining wing ribs and fuselage frames on 5-axis CNC machines (incidentally, these functions were also later sold to CADAM Inc). DRAPO (Définition et Réalisation d’Avions par Ordinateur - computer-aided aircraft definition and realisation) was the acronym given to this integration of GEOVA 3D and CADAM 2.5D.

In 1977, facing the integration problems inevitably created by constant needs of new applications, but also facing the rapid improvement of computer user-friendliness, Bernard conceived a complete rewriting of GEOVA. With the agreement of his management, Jean Cabrière and Pierre Bohn, he started designing a new architecture encompassing the whole set of functions as well as interactive graphical interfaces addressing non-computer specialists. This was the beginning of CATI (Computer-Aided Tridimensionnal Interactive application) that in a few years became CATIA (Computer-Aided Three-dimensional Interactive Application).

=== Formation of Dassault Systèmes ===
In 1981, the decision to market CATIA led to the creation of Dassault Systèmes. This was a bold decision; at that time no other aircraft manufacturer would have made public its design tools (for 3D at least). Founding a software editor, Dassault Systèmes, ran the risk of CATIA technology spreading to competitors. There was a precedent in Lockheed's marketing of CADAM, but that was an exception and 2D knowledge was not a breakthrough technology. CATIA, by contrast, was not only a new software tool, it was a business transformation.

Bernard also had a smaller workforce than competitors, and Dassault Systèmes was created later than other well-established companies in this sector, mostly American, such as CADAM, ComputerVision or CALMA, with hundreds of employees. Moreover, among French competitors, Datavision had a fairly comparable offer with Euclid. Dassault Systèmes started with barely 20 people and a single customer, Dassault Aviation.

The capital was initially shared between three owners: Benno-Claude Vallières (CEO of Dassault Aviation) with 10%, Charles Edelstenne (general secretary of Dassault Aviation) with another 10%, and the remaining 80% with the Dassault family. Edelstenne was appointed board chairman and Bernard CEO.

=== IBM partnership ===
From the beginning, a partnership with IBM was key to Dassault Systèmes' success. IBM ensured the entire marketing of CATIA. Getting CATIA enter the IT leader’s catalogue demanded a huge effort. The qualification process, which began in 1980, took several months. Competition against other software options was fierce. But "IBM had identified CADAM's shortcomings and was looking for a product for its catalogue that would complement it, particularly in the field of three-dimensional representations. After a long and thorough analysis by IBM technicians assigned at Dassault in its CADCAM center in Saint-Cloud, CATI was selected against its competitors, respectively presented by Northrop, and by Nissan.”

To comply with the partnership, Bernard and his team had to understand, translate and implement IBM's requirements, while properly positioning new products to accommodate CADAM, already in the IBM's catalogue for years. The similar look and feel as well as the interface between the two software packages (already developed at Dassault Aviation) was decisive in convincing the IBM sales force of the CAD/CAM solution consistency, and complementarity between CATIA and CADAM. This focus on consistency was rewarded at the end of 1991 when Dassault Systèmes acquired CADAM from IBM, which had acquired it two years earlier. In exchange, IBM took 10% of Dassault Systèmes shareholding. The deal also included an agreement whereby Dassault Systèmes became IBM's only CAD/CAM partner.

=== Company growth ===
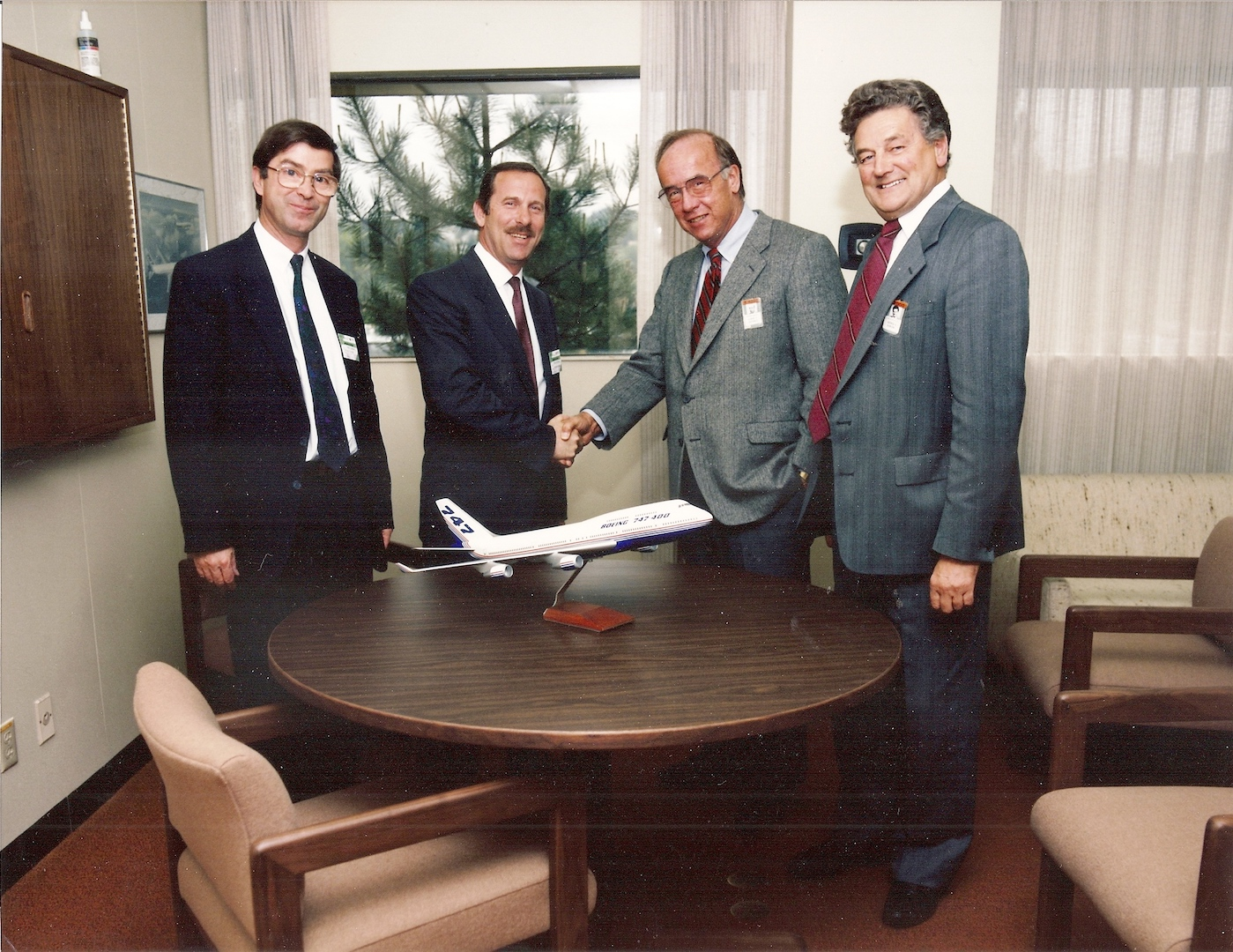
Francis Bernard and Charles Edelstenne with Boeing Group Directors

In its first year, Dassault Systèmes gained major customers including Honda in Japan, Mercedes and BMW in Germany (West Germany at this time), SNECMA (today part of the SAFRAN Group) in France, and Grumman Aerospace in the United States. IBM's salesforce showed its strength, helping convince a major company, Boeing, though Bernard spent several years managing a demanding pre-sale effort to convince Boeing of the business value.

Meanwhile, Bernard managed the company's workforce growth. In eight years, the company rose from 20 people to more than 500. In 1991, for its tenth anniversary, it had more than 800 people, and about 2500 customers (40% in automotive, 30% in aeronautics, 30% others). It had almost 8000 customers in 1993; subsidiaries were set up in the United States and Japan.

To meet customers’ needs, CATIA had to be constantly adapted to include new functions or interfaces to new hardware and software. The start-up was being challenged by continuous requirements for new applications while maintaining the consistency of the whole.

In 1988, Bernard created a subsidiary, Dassault Data Services (DDS), to enter the growing IT professional services market. The growing complexity of IT environments generated demand for tailored solutions and skills able to integrate diverse software packages. However, the DDS business remained basically intertwined with Dassault Systèmes products, offering training, consultancy and specific development. Currently, 95% of DDS shares are owned by Dassault Systèmes.

=== Software versioning ===
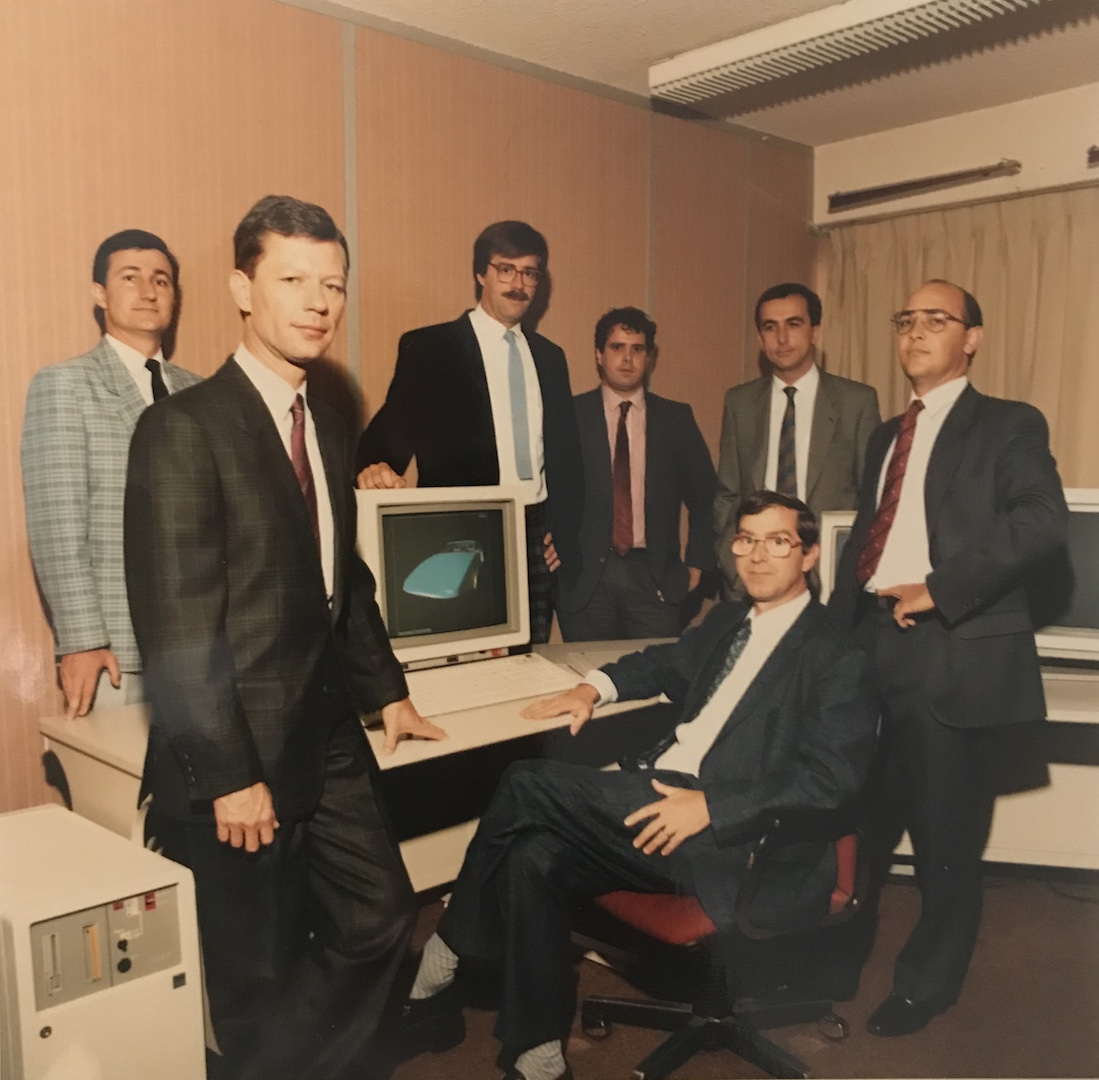
The Dassault Systèmes’ management in 1987: Francis Bernard, seated. Standing on the left, in the foreground, Dominique Calmels, at the back from left to right Bernard Charlès, Bernard Vermersh, Bruno Latchague, Philippe Forestier, Jean-Michel Morin

Bernard initiated a product policy based on versions (major changes) and "releases" (updates and further functions), strongly influenced by IBM. Its realization in a young company like Dassault Systèmes was achieved because of a strong internal consensus, an entrepreneurial spirit focused on flexibility, and a confidence in the company’s technological advance. « …[The CATIA] major advance over CADAM was the 3rd dimension. In 1984 drafting capabilities were added to CATIA, enabling it to function independently of CADAM. By 1985 CATIA Version 2 contained fully integrated drafting, solid and robotics functions, making it the aeronautical applications leader. By 1988 CATIA Version 3 contained AEC functionality and was ported to IBM's UNIX-based RS/6000 workstations. CATIA thus became the automotive applications leader as well. »

- 1981: CATIA Version 1, running on MVS with applications of 3D shape design, multi-axis machining, a CADAM-CATIA interface, kinematics functions modelling for example the movements of a landing gear or wing slats and flaps.
- 1984: CATIA V2, running on VM in addition to MVS. On the functional side, it added 2D drawing features, it handled composite structures, and included functions for the automotive industry.
- 1988: CATIA V3, integrating IBM workstations under Unix in connection to MVS mainframes. At the end of the 1980s, the demand for workstations was high, and manufacturers such as Sun or Hewlett Packard were becoming dominant in the scientific and industrial sectors. One of the key enrichments was the Digital mockup (DMU), which provided enhanced representations of assemblies and their components, in the 1990s. "At the time of the Mirage's design, the process was highlighted by Friday afternoon meetings at Dassault Aviation, next to a prototype. Coordination of skills, exchanges between design office and factory, happened around the physical model. But to achieve it, we had to build a prototype aircraft on scale 1, realistic (with real materials) and it had to evolve permanently. In the 1990s, the physical model was replaced by a DMU, which became the repository for all company departments (equipment, structures, coating, circuits, etc.)."
- 1993: CATIA V4, showing a profound evolution of the relationship with IBM. CATIA became independent from IBM hardware and, in addition to IBM Unix platform, operated on Hewlett Packard, Sun, Silicon Graphics workstations. “On the station side, the exemplary loyalty that Dassault Systèmes had shown to IBM was becoming unsustainable. Today, all major CAD publishers offer their products on at least two or three families of machines from Hewlett Packard, Silicon Graphics, Sun, IBM and Digital (not counting the PC offerings)." Among the important enhancements was the parametric design introduced by a newly formed company, PTC, which had built its Pro/Engineer software on very new principles. It marked a major transformation of representation capabilities. Parametric allows dimensions to become variable and when one changes those depending on it change accordingly. In other words, a change in a drawing dimension is passed on to the parts concerned and all 2D drawings are automatically updated.

=== Retirement ===
By 1995, Dassault Systèmes had adapted to many major technology disruptions: computer hardware had been transformed in the 1980s and 1990s; workstations had spread into industrial enterprises along with connectivity through local networks, competing with mainframes. In response, Dassault Systèmes' product offers had expanded, and addressed more industries; numerous functions were added, and configuration management developed. The company also added customers in countries including Russia, India, China, South Africa, Taiwan, Korea, Australia, and Israel. CATIA was being completely rewritten (V5), and the strategic decision to enter the Microsoft world was ongoing. With 1,000 employees, and subsidiaries in the USA, Germany and Japan, Dassault Systèmes had reached a leading position and wanted to deploy its offers on all PCs in the industrial sector. Between 1994 and 1995, Its net profit increased by 40% and the turnover by 10%.

In 1995, after managing the company for 14 years, Bernard quit his CEO position and handed it over to Bernard Charlès.

Bernard's career path as an engineer initially attracted by technology and innovation had evolved towards enterprise management with its manifold aspects: development, marketing, sales, partnership with IBM, human resources, and finances. He had anticipated the potential of 3D at a time it was just emerging, and imagined a digital platform (CATIA) that transformed design and manufacturing methods.

== Honours and distinctions ==
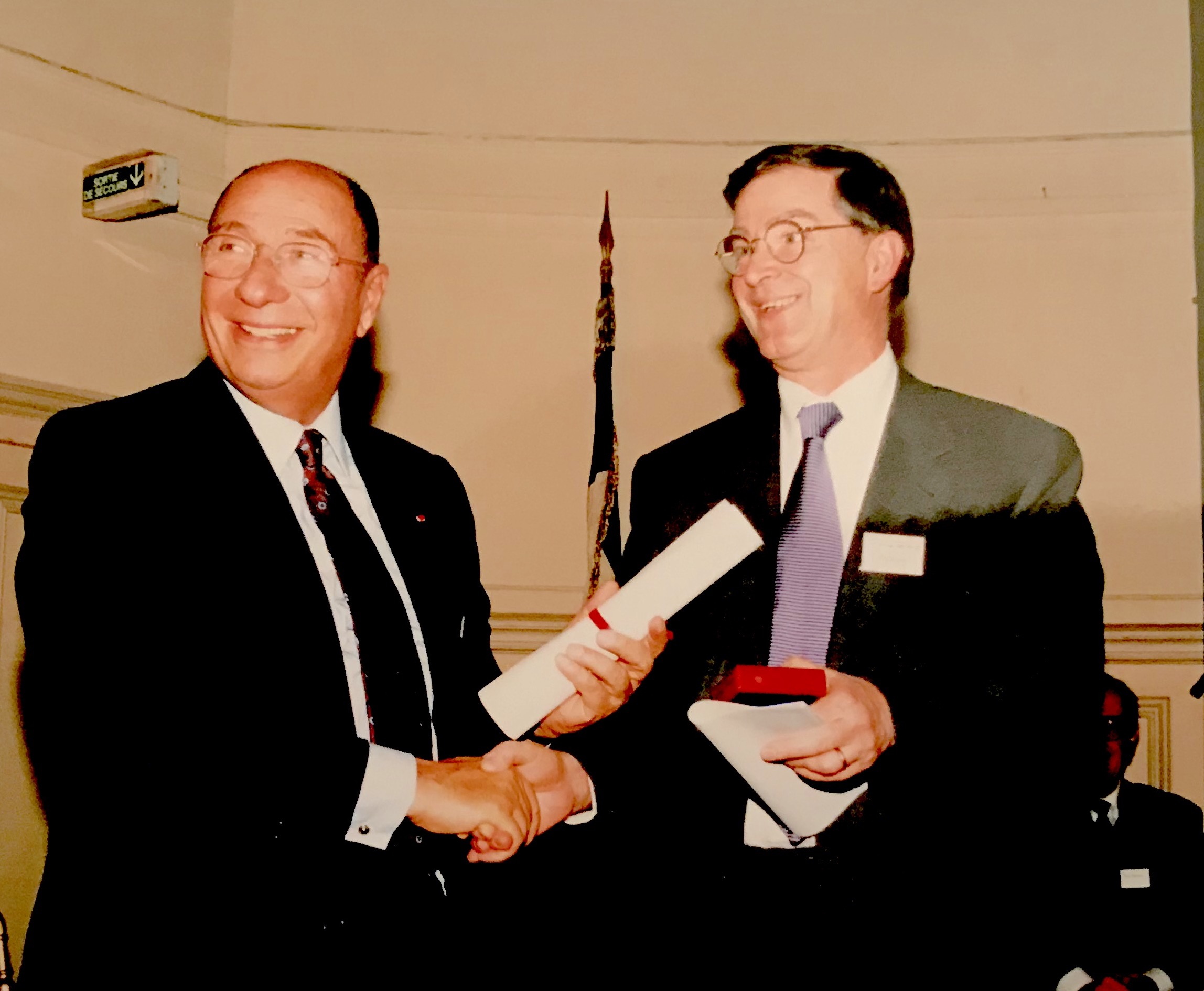
Chaptal Prize awarded by Serge Dassault

Bernard received the following distinctions:

- "General Nicolau Award 2003" awarded by the International Academy for Production Engineering
- Grand Prize of the Academy of Air and Space in 1997
- Chaptal 1998 awarded by the National Industry Incentive Society
- Winner of the Aviation Week & Space Technology award, IT/Electronics, in 1998
