= Deneb (disambiguation) =

Deneb is a supergiant star in the constellation Cygnus, also known as α Cygni.

Deneb can also refer to:

- Deneb Kaitos (disambiguation), a proper name applied to two different stars in the constellation Cetus
- Deneb el Okab (disambiguation), a proper name applied to two different stars in the constellation Aquila
- Deneb Algedi, the star δ Capricorni
- Deneb Dulfim, the star ε Delphini
- Deneb Algenubi, the star η Ceti
- SS Deneb, a German cargo steamship
- Deneb Robotics, a 3D factory simulation software company
- Deneb Karentz, biology professor at the University of San Francisco
- Deneb, a Phenom II processor core
- Deneb Sector, a supplement for the science fiction role-playing game Traveller

== See also ==
- Denebola, the star β Leonis
