= Dana TM4 =

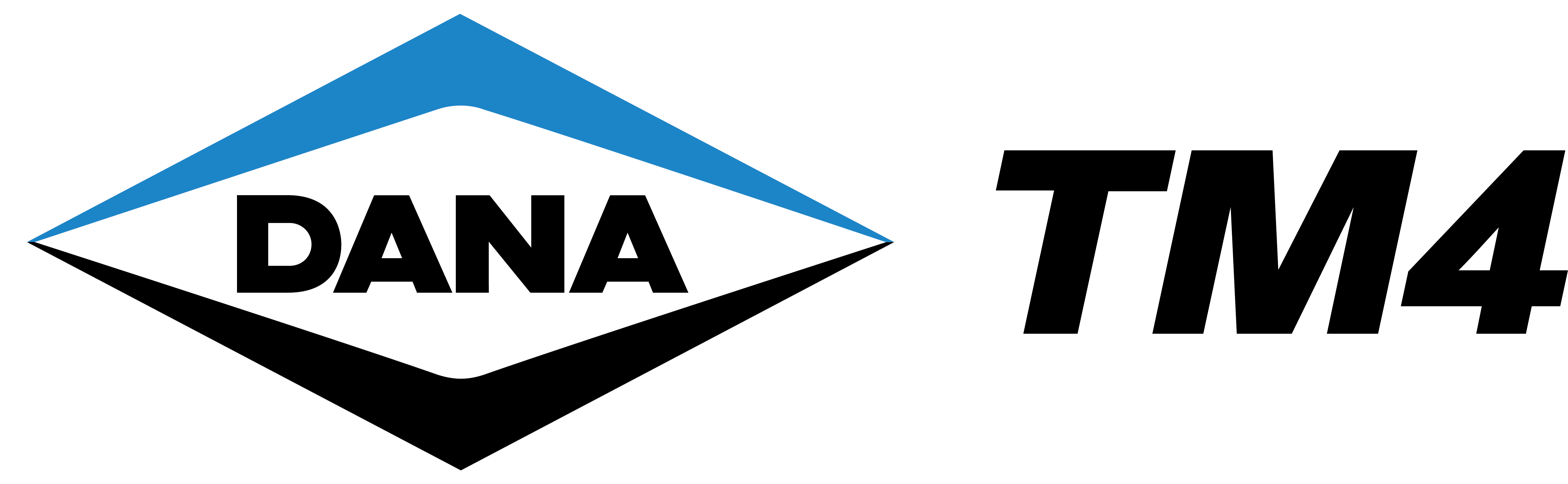
- Dana TM4 Logo
- Company type: Privately owned
- Industry: Cleantech, Transportation, Automotive, Commercial vehicle
- Founded: Boucherville, Québec, Canada (1998)
- Headquarters: Boucherville, Canada
- Products: Electric motors Power Electronics; Vehicle software
- Parent: 55% Dana Incorporated, 45% Hydro-Québec
- Website: www.danatm4.com

Dana TM4, previously known as TM4 Inc., is a joint-venture between Dana Corporation and government-owned public utility Hydro-Québec. Established in 1998, it is active in the development of electric vehicle motors and related power systems. After spinning-off from Hydro-Québec's research center to commercialize their electric powertrain technologies, TM4 encountered some success in the 2000s, participating in many short-lived OEM demonstration programs. Commercially, things began to take-off in the 2010s, especially after they diversified their product ranges to serve the commercial vehicle (bus and truck) market. As of 2018, thousands of electric and hybrid vehicles were equipped with TM4 systems.

To help TM4 become a global player in the supply of electric drivetrain components, Hydro-Québec, who had been its sole shareholder for most of TM4's existence, announced that it planned to set up a joint-venture with a world-scale auto parts manufacturer to facilitate the mass production and marketing of its product. In line with this strategy, it announced in June 2018 that Dana Corporation would take over as majority shareholder of the company, while it would keep a minority stake.

In 2019, Hydro-Québec announces that the company has invested $85 million to maintain its 45% interest in TM4, now called Dana TM4, and that now includes the following strategic relationships:

- The exclusive property of Chinese company Dana Electric Motor Co. Ltd, formerly called Prestolite E-Propulsion Systems (PEPS), in which Dana TM4 previously held a 50% interest. Dana Electric Motor Co. manufactures and markets electric powertrain systems, particularly for buses and trucks. This transaction will enable Dana TM4 to optimize its operations and ensure the development of its activities in China, the fastest-growing market in terms of transportation electrification.
- The integration of the activities of electric motor company SME, an Italian company which has developed a range of electric motors and controls for a wide range of off-highway electric vehicle applications, including material handling, agriculture, construction, and automated-guided vehicles. SME low-voltage systems are a perfect complement to the Dana TM4 high-voltage product line.

This investment puts Dana TM4 in a position to offer electric powertrain systems for all types of land vehicles, including light vehicles (cars and pickups), commercial vehicles (buses and trucks), and off-highway vehicles (construction, mining, and lift trucks).

== Background ==
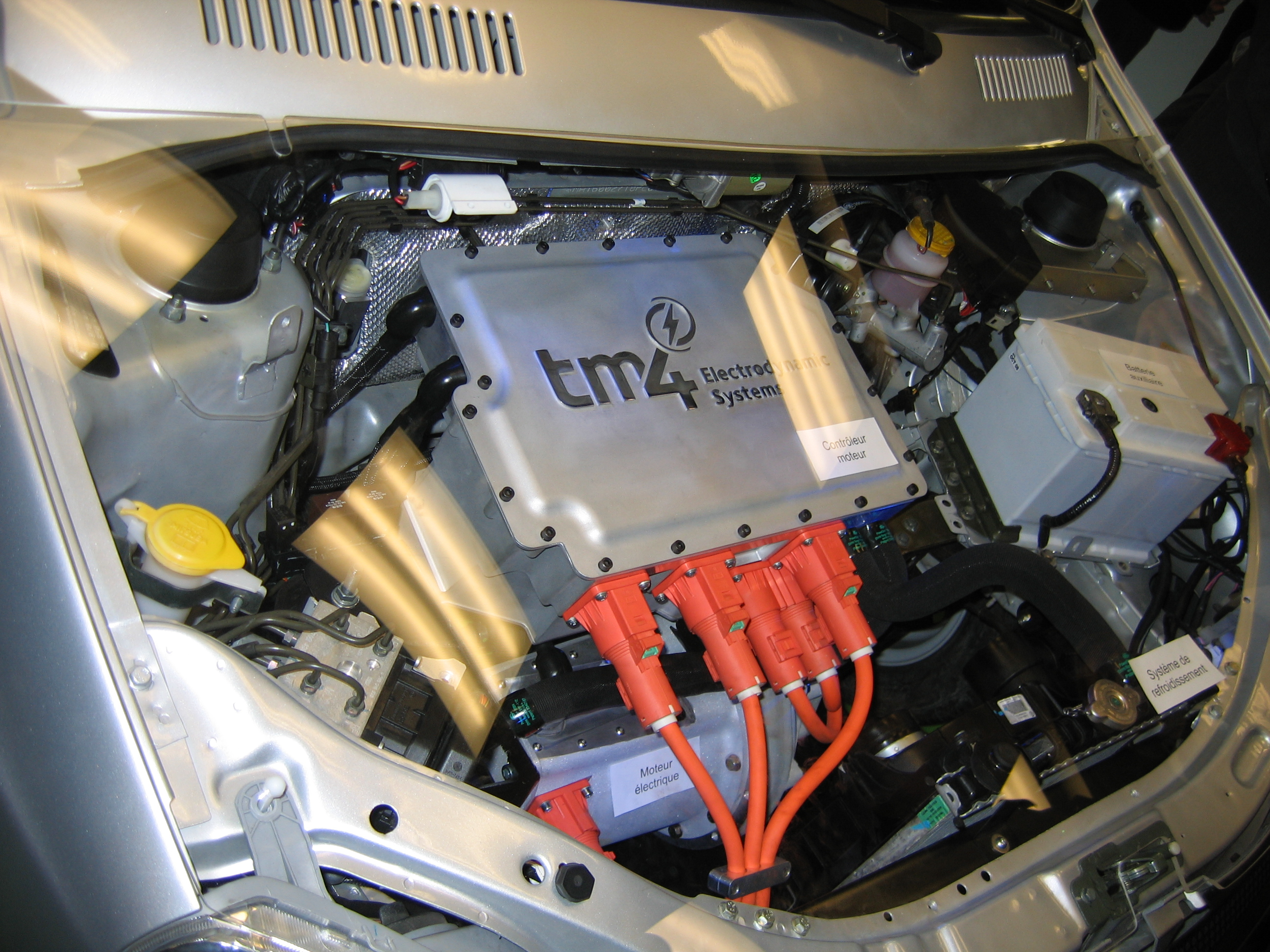
A TM4 MФTIVE motor

=== Technology development ===
On August 19, 1994, the Premier of Quebec, Daniel Johnson, had announced a C$100 million project to develop an electric car for the year 2000. On August 30, 1994, Hydro-Québec had presented their first prototype based on a Dodge Intrepid. The economy in fuel consumption was evaluated between 80 and 85%. The project was cancelled in 1995 and many have seen the abandonment of this project as a repetition of the history of the CF-105. In 1998, Hydro-Québec worked on a prototype with a joint venture between Dassault Group and Société de Véhicules Electriques, the first prototypes based on a Renault Kangoo were built in 2006.

Hydro-Québec has been criticized for not having taken advantage of some of its innovations. An electric wheel motor concept that struck a chord with Quebecers, first prototyped in 1994 by Pierre Couture, an engineer and physicist working at Institut de recherche d'Hydro-Québec (IREQ), is one of these. The heir to the Couture wheel motor is now marketed by TM4, a subsidiary that has made deals with France's Dassault and Heuliez to develop an electric car, the Cleanova, of which prototypes were built in 2006. Hydro-Québec announced in early 2009 at the Montreal International Auto Show that its engine had been chosen by Tata Motors to equip a demonstration version of its Indica model, which will be road tested in Norway. IREQ's researchers are also working on developing new battery technologies for electric cars. Current research is focusing on technologies to increase range, improve performance in cold weather and reduce charging time.

=== Pilot programs and expansion of product range ===
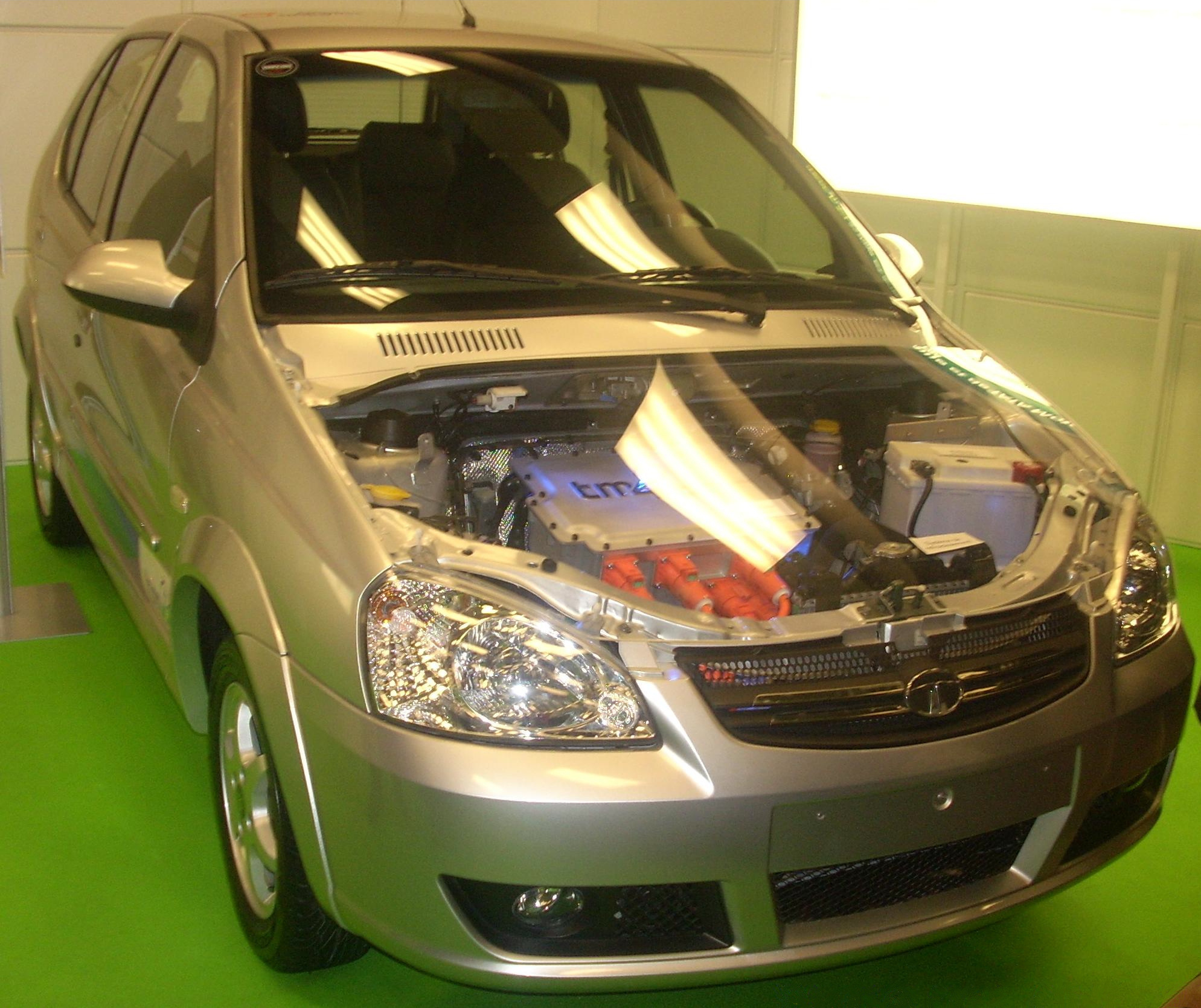
Tata Indica EV equipped with a TM4 MOTIVE motor

The first commercialization of the systems started in 2004 with the interest of Cleanova and Peugeot. Citroën had presented their new diesel hybrid Citroën C-Métisse equipped with the TM4 motor at the Paris auto show in 2006. In 2009, 110 units were delivered to the Miljø and Tata Motors demonstration project in Norway. In 2011, Tata Motors expect to sell up to 5000 of their Indica Vista EV in Europe, and to be able to face this demand, TM4 has upgraded its production facilities in Boucherville to be able to produce up to 10,000 units of their MOTIVE powertrain systems per year if needed.

Over the years TM4 has diversified its product range based on the needs of two segments of the transportation industry. Its MOTIVE systems are compact and power dense in order to be integrated into light-duty on and off-road vehicle platforms while the SUMO motors are high torque, direct drive system optimized for buses and commercial vehicles.

The Société de transport de Montréal (STM) announced that it would replace the aging fleet of buses with a new family of buses powered by TM4 engine. All buses that run on the network of the STM in 2026 should run on electricity. The current fleet of 1,600 buses need 50 million liters of diesel each year. The plan would eliminate the need of diesel and eventually reduce the greenhouse gas. Los Angeles-based Thor Trucks use a TM4 for their battery-electric truck.

=== Mass production and joint-venture in China ===
China being one of the biggest market for electric buses, TM4 announced in 2012 the creation of a 50/50 joint venture in China. In partnership with Prestolite Electric Beijing Limited (PEBL), TM4 created Prestolite E-Propulsion Systems (PEPS). Under this agreement, PEPS will produce the technologies developed by TM4 under license and will market them to the commercial vehicle and bus industry (the TM4 SUMO systems). In 2014, TM4 and PEPS announced the beginning of high volume production in the Beijing plant as well as its first large scale commercial orders, from major Chinese bus manufacturers such as Foton Motor.

In May 2017, it was announced that PEPS had produced and sold more than 5000 electric bus powertrains for the Chinese market. Later that month, the first Novabus LFSe buses using TM4 powertrains have started operating in Montreal in 2017. TM4 is also supplying Quebec-based Lion Bus with drivetrain systems, as well as many other truck and bus manufacturers and integrators in North America and Europe.

=== Dana acquisition and global expansion ===
On June 22, 2018, Dana Incorporated and Hydro-Quebec jointly announced that TM4 would be turned into a 55 / 45 joint-venture. Both parties believe that by partnering and complementing their respective strengths, TM4 will be able to reach its full potential.

In July 2019, Hydro-Québec announces that the company has invested $85 million to secure the growth of TM4, now called Dana TM4, and to ensure its leadership position in the electric powertrain sector. This investment includes the exclusive property of Chinese company Dana Electric Motor Co. Ltd, formerly called Prestolite E-Propulsion Systems (PEPS), by Dana TM4, in which it previously held a 50% interest. The new Dana TM4 entity also incorporated the activities of Italian low voltage inverter and motor manufacturer SME Group, as well as, in 2020 Ashwood Electric motors in the UK.

In 2020, Dana TM4 announced the opening of a new production facility for electric motors and inverters in the Pune region of India and in 2021, an announcement was made regarding a new production plant in Amal, Sweden.

On May 10th, 2024, Hydro-Québec announced it would be exercing the put option of its minority interest in Dana TM4, exiting the joint-venture once they have agreed with Dana on a fair market value for the transaction.
