= DELMIA =

Manufacturing software

- Developer: Dassault Systèmes
- Operating system: Windows / Unix
- License: Proprietary software
- Website: 3ds.com/delmia

DELMIA (Digital Enterprise Lean Manufacturing Interactive Application), a brand within Dassault Systèmes, is a software platform designed for use in manufacturing and supply chain professionals. It offers various tools encompassing digital manufacturing, operations, and supply-chain management, including simulation, planning, scheduling, modeling, execution, and real-time operations management.

== History ==
- January 2000 – Dassault Systèmes forms DELMIA as a brand for digital manufacturing and production solutions. It was formed after the acquisition and consolidation of Deneb Robotics, EAI-Delta, and Safework by Dassault Systèmes.
- April 2003 – DELMIA receives honors from the State of Michigan and Oakland County for its contribution to the county and state.
- November 2003 – DELMIA is profiled on CNN news channel as a winner in the network's "Champions of Industry" award series.
- September 2005 – DELMIA wins the Automation Alley "Technology Company of the Year" award.
- April 2007 – Frost & Sullivan selects Dassault Systèmes and DELMIA as the recipient of the 2007 Company of the Year Award within the North American product life-cycle management (PLM) solutions space.
- May 2008 – Release of Version 6 DELMIA to create, share, execute and optimize virtual production systems.
- May 2009 – DELMIA was recognized as an Automotive News PACE (Premiere Automotive Suppliers’ Contribution to Excellence) Award Winner.
- June 2010 – DELMIA Human models Teo and Sia get an upgrade and become lifelike with the Dassault Systèmes Version 6 2011 release.
- June 2010 – DELMIA introduces a video series called, "The Robot Whisperers"
- March 2011 – Dassault Systèmes acquires Intercim LLC. Intercim is now known as DELMIA Operations.
- July 2013 – The Dassault Systèmes Apriso acquisition is completed. Apriso will be integrated into the DELMIA application portfolio and virtual plus reality capabilities.
- July 2014 – Dassault Systèmes acquires Quintiq.
- December 2016 – Dassault Systèmes acquires IQMS, rebranded to DELMIAWorks.
- September 2022 – Dassault Systèmes acquires Diota, now DELMIA Augmented Experience.

== Market ==
DELMIA's clientele ranges from individuals to large corporations with software offerings serving multiple industries including: architecture, engineering, and construction (AEC), aerospace and defense, business services, consumer packaged goods and services, high tech, home and lifestyle, industrial equipment, infrastructure, and energy and materials.

Direct competitive solutions to DELMIA include: Siemens Digital Industries, SAP, O9Solutions, PTC, Rockwell Automation, Kinaxis, IBM, Oracle, Epicor, Panasonic, and BlueYonder.

== Products and services ==
=== Modeling technology ===
Industrial engineering is a branch of engineering that focuses on optimizing complex systems, processes, and organizations. One of the key tools used in industrial engineering is modeling technology. Modeling technology involves creating virtual representations of real-world systems using computer software. This allows engineers to simulate and analyze these systems before implementing changes or improvements in the physical world. It is a way to "test" changes before implementation, reducing risks and costs associated with trial and error.

A specific type of modeling technology that has gained popularity in recent years is digital or virtual twin technology. A virtual twin is a virtual representation of a physical asset, such as a machine or system. This technology allows for real-time monitoring, analysis, and optimization of the physical asset by using data from its digital twin.

=== Execution technology ===
Manufacturing execution technology, also known as manufacturing execution systems (MES), is a software-based solution that helps manufacturers manage and monitor their production processes in real-time. It integrates data from various sources such as machines, employees, and inventory to enable better decision-making and optimize operations.

Manufacturing operations management (MOM) is a broad term encompassing all the activities of running a manufacturing plant, from planning and scheduling to production monitoring and analysis. MES is an essential component of MOM, providing real-time visibility into the production process and facilitating efficient communication between different departments.

Manufacturing execution technology collects data from various sources, such as machines, sensors, and employee inputs. This data is then analyzed to provide real-time insights into the production process, enabling manufacturers to make informed decisions. MES also helps automate manual processes, reducing errors and improving overall efficiency.

=== Collaboration technology ===
Collaborative solutions use digital tools that enable individuals and teams to work together remotely in real-time. They focus on manufacturing and business operations, particularly in lean manufacturing environments where optimizing productivity and efficiency is crucial. With the rise of remote work in response to the COVID-19 pandemic, collaborative technology has become an essential tool for companies to keep their operations running while maintaining a lean approach to manufacturing. This technology also facilitates the exchange of ideas and knowledge between team members, leading to innovation and improved problem-solving.

Collaborative technology has assisted the way projects are managed and executed. By using digital tools such as project management software, virtual meetings, and online document-sharing platforms, teams can work together in real-time with increased efficiency and transparency.

== Product portfolio ==
=== Digital manufacturing and virtual twin experience ===
DELMIA deals with digital manufacturing, simulation tools, and virtual twin technology. These technologies allow manufacturers to create a digital version of their production facilities, including machines, equipment, and tools. This virtual twin can then be used to simulate and optimize manufacturing processes before any physical production takes place.

DELMIA's digital manufacturing scope also includes 3DLean, a set of tools and methodologies based on lean principles. 3DLean enables manufacturers to optimize their operations to reduce waste and increase productivity.

=== DELMIA Apriso ===
DELMIA Apriso focuses on manufacturing operations management and assists companies in optimizing their production processes through digital transformation.

DELMIA Apriso is able to integrate with enterprise resource planning (ERP) systems, allowing for communication between manufacturing and business operations. This integration improves efficiency and productivity by streamlining workflows and providing real-time data analysis.

In addition to ERP integration, DELMIA Apriso offers advanced production scheduling capabilities, enabling manufacturers to plan and manage their production schedules. This feature reduces lead times, minimizes inventory levels, and increases on-time delivery rates.

DELMIA Apriso also includes quality management features that allow manufacturers to monitor and control the quality of their products throughout the production process.

=== DELMIA Quintiq ===
The DELMIA Quintiq software serves supply chain management sectors. Centralized on advanced planning, scheduling, and optimization capabilities. Quintiq uses AI, machine learning, and cloud computing technologies. In 2019, DELMIA Quintiq was implemented into British high-speed rail operator, Eurostar's systems.

=== DELMIA Ortems ===
The core functionality of DELMIA Ortems allows companies to create detailed plans for their production processes based on various factors such as available resources, orders, and constraints. The software also offers real-time monitoring and analysis of production operations, allowing for agile adjustments in response to unforeseen events.

=== DELMIA Augmented Experience ===
DELMIA Augmented Experience (formerly, Diota) combines augmented reality with manufacturing processes to create an interactive experience by integrating it into the entire production process. Users can access real-time information and instructions through AR, in design, assembly, and maintenance stages.

This technology is used in the automotive and aerospace industries, where precision and safety are paramount. It allows workers to visualize proposed changes or new designs in a real-world setting before implementing them, reducing errors and saving time.

=== DELMIAWorks ===
Formerly IQMS, DELMIAWorks provides real-time manufacturing, production monitoring, quality control, supply chain management, customer relationship management and e-business solutions through ERP and other software for the automotive, medical, plastics and general manufacturing industries.

== See also ==
- digital manufacturing
- simulation
- manufacturing operations management
- industrial engineering
- 3d modeling software
- additive manufacturing
- augmented reality
- supply-chain management
