= Digital manufacturing =

Digital manufacturing is an integrated approach to manufacturing that is centered around a computer system. The transition to digital manufacturing has become more popular with the rise in the quantity and quality of computer systems in manufacturing plants. As more automated tools have become used in manufacturing plants it has become necessary to model, simulate, and analyze all of the machines, tooling, and input materials in order to optimize the manufacturing process. Overall, digital manufacturing can be seen sharing the same goals as computer-integrated manufacturing (CIM), flexible manufacturing, lean manufacturing, and design for manufacturability (DFM). The main difference is that digital manufacturing was evolved for use in the computerized world.

As part of Manufacturing USA, Congress and the U.S. Department of Defense established MxD (Manufacturing x Digital), the nation's digital manufacturing institute, to speed adoption of these digital tools.

== Three dimensional modeling ==
Manufacturing engineers use 3D modeling software to design the tools and machinery necessary for their intended applications. The software allows them to design the factory floor layout and the production flow. This technique lets engineers analyze the current manufacturing processes and allows them to search for ways to increase efficiency in production before production even begins.

== Simulation ==
Simulation can be used to model and test a system's behavior. Simulation also provides engineers with a tool for inexpensive, fast, and secure analysis to test how changes in a system can affect the performance of that system.

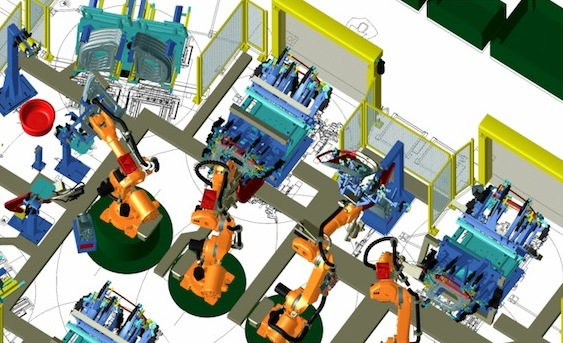
Robcad is a popular software used in digital manufacturing. Models of automated machinery and production lines can be created and simulated in real time.

These models can be classified into the following:

- Static - System of equations at a point in time
- Dynamic - System of equations that incorporate time as a variable
- Continuous - Dynamic model where time passes linearly
- Discrete - Dynamic model where time is separated into chunks
- Deterministic - Models where a unique solution is generated per a given input
- Stochastic - Models where a solution is generated utilizing probabilistic parameters

Applications of simulation can be assigned to:

- Product design (e.g. virtual reality)
- Process design (e.g. assisting in the design of manufacturing processes)
- Enterprise resource planning

== Analysis ==
Digital manufacturing systems often incorporate optimization capabilities to reduce time, cost, and improve the efficiency of most processes. These systems improve optimization of floor schedules, production planning, and decision making. The system analyzes feedback from production, such as deviations or problems in the manufacturing system, and generates solutions for handling them.

In addition, many technologies analyze data from simulations in order to calculate a design that is optimal before it is even built.

Debate continues on the impact of such systems on the manufacturing workforce. Econometric models have found that each newly installed robot displaces 1.6 manufacturing workers on average. Those models also have forecasted that by 2030 as many as 20 million additional manufacturing jobs worldwide could be displaced due to robotization.

However, other research has found evidence, not of job losses, but of a skills gap. Digital manufacturing is creating hundreds of new data-centric manufacturing jobs — roles like “collaborative robotics technician” and “predictive maintenance systems specialist" — but not enough available workers with the skills and training necessary to fill them.

== Tooling and processes ==
There are many different tooling processes that digital manufacturing utilizes. However, every digital manufacturing process involves the use of computerized numerical controlled machines (CNC). This technology is crucial in digital manufacturing as it not only enables mass production and flexibility, but it also provides a link between a CAD model and production. The two primary categories of CNC tooling are additive and subtractive. Major strides in additive manufacturing have come about recently and are at the forefront of digital manufacturing. These processes allow machines to address every element of a part no matter the complexity of its shape.

=== Examples of additive tooling and processes ===
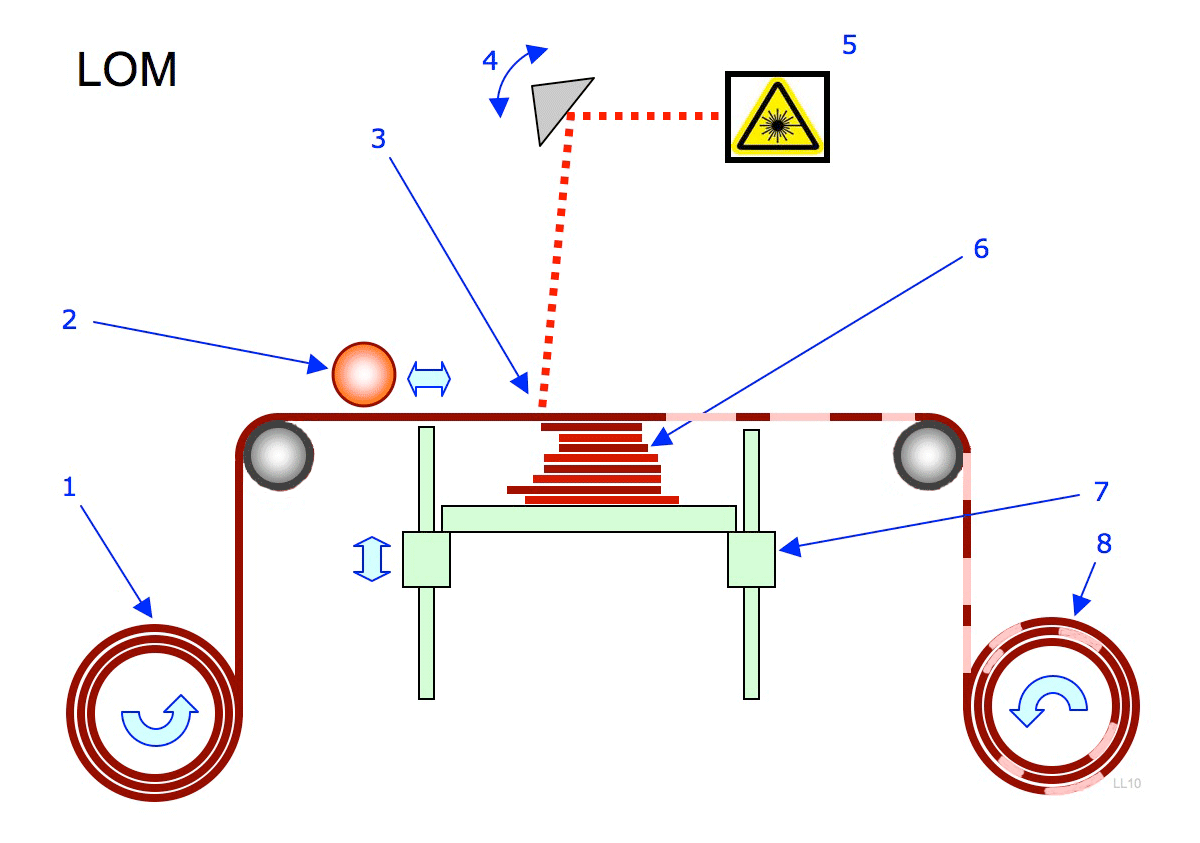
Example of Laminated object manufacturing process Laminated object manufacturing: principle drawing. 1 Supply roll. 2 Heated laminated roll. 3 Laser cutting beam. 4 Prism steering device. 5 Laser. 6 Laminated shape. 7 Movable table. 8 Waste roll (with cutout shapes).

- Stereolithography - In this process, solid parts are formed by solidifying layers of a photopolymer with ultraviolet light. There is a wide range of acrylics and epoxies that are used in this process.
- Ink-Jet Processing - Although the most widely used ink-jet process is used for printing on paper, there are many that are applied in engineering. This process involves a printhead depositing layers of liquid material onto a filler powder in the shape of the desired object. After the powder is saturated, a fresh new layer of powder is added continually until the object is built. Another less known material drop deposition process use a build and support material to produce a 3D model. The build material is Thermoplastic and the support material is wax. The wax is melted away after the layered model is printed. Another similar technique uses (DBM) Droplet based manufacturing to build Thermoplastic models without support with 5 axis drop positioning
- Laser sintering and fusion - This process utilizes heat produced by infrared lasers to bond a powdered material together to form a solid shape.
- Solid ground curing - A layer of liquid photopolymer is spread over a platform. An optical mask is generated and laid over the polymer. A UV lamp cures the resin that is not blocked by the mask. Any remaining liquid is removed and the voids are filled with wax. Liquid resin is spread over the layer that was just produced and the process is repeated. When the part is finished, the wax can be melted out of the voids.
- Laminated-Object Manufacturing - A sheet material is laid on a platform and a laser cuts the desired contour. The platform is lowered by one sheet thickness and a new sheet is laid with a layer of thermal adhesive between the two sheets. A heated roller presses the sheets together and activates the adhesive. The laser cuts the contours of this layer and the process is repeated. When the part is finished, the leftover sheet material around the perimeter of the part must be removed. The final part is coated with sealant.
- Fused filament fabrication- FFF is the most commonly used form of 3-D printing. Thermoplastic material is heated just beyond solidification and extruded onto a platform in the desired shape. The platform is lowered, and the next layer is extruded onto the previous layer. The process is repeated until the part is complete.

=== Examples of subtractive tooling and processes ===
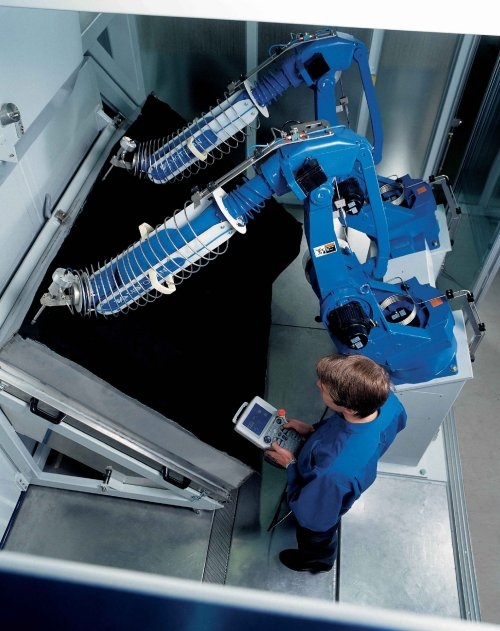
A CNC waterjet cutter is an example of the types of computer controlled tooling that are essential to digital manufacturing.

- Water Jet Cutting - A water jet cutter is a CNC tool that uses a high pressure stream of water, often mixed with an abrasive material, to cut shapes or patterns out of many types of materials.
- Milling - A CNC mill uses a rotational cutting tool to remove material from a piece of stock. Milling can be performed on most metals, many plastics, and all types of wood.
- Lathe - A CNC lathe removes material by rotating the work-piece while a stationary cutting tool is brought into contact with the material.
- Laser cutting - A Laser cutter is a CNC tool that uses a focused laser beam to cut and engrave sheet material. Cutting can be done on plastics, woods and on higher power machines, metal. Recently, affordable CO_{2} laser cutters have become popular with hobbyists.

== Benefits ==
- Optimization of a parts manufacturing process. This can be done by modifying and/or creating procedures within a virtual and controlled environment. By doing this the use of new robotic or automated systems can be tested in the manufacturing procedure before being physically implemented.
- Digital manufacturing allows for the whole manufacturing process to be created virtually before it is implemented physically. This enables designers to see the results of their process before investing time and money into creating the physical plant.
- The effects caused by changing the machines or tooling processes can be seen in real-time. This allows for analysis information to be taken for any individual part at any desired point during the manufacturing process.

== Types ==
=== On demand ===
- Additive Manufacturing - Additive manufacturing is the "process of joining materials to make objects from 3D model data, usually layer upon layer." Digital Additive manufacturing is highly automated which means less man hours and machine utilization, and therefore reduced cost. By incorporating model data from digitized open sources, products can be produced quickly, efficiently, and cheaply.
- Rapid Manufacturing - Much like Additive manufacturing, Rapid manufacturing uses digital models to rapidly produce a product that can be complicated in shape and heterogeneous in material composition. Rapid manufacturing utilizes not only the digital information process, but also the digital physical process. Digital information governs the physical process of adding material layer by layer until the product is complete. Both the information and physical processes are necessary for rapid manufacturing to be flexible in design, cheap, and efficient.

=== Cloud-based design and manufacturing ===
Cloud-Based Design (CBD) refers to a model that incorporates social network sites, cloud computing, and other web technologies to aid in cloud design services. This type of system must be cloud computing-based, be accessible from mobile devices, and must be able to manage complex information. Autodesk Fusion 360 is an example CBD.

Cloud-Based Manufacturing (CBM) refers to a model that utilizes the access to open information from various resources to develop reconfigurable production lines to improve efficiency, reduce costs, and improve response to customer needs. A number of online manufacturing platforms enables users to upload their 3D files for DFM analysis and Manufacture.

== See also ==
- Injection moulding
- Rapid prototyping
