= Deneb el Okab =

The traditional star name Deneb el Okab refers to two stars in the constellation Aquila:

- Epsilon Aquilae
- Zeta Aquilae

The name derives from the Arabic term ذنب العقاب ðanab al-ʽuqāb meaning "the tail of the eagle".

== See also ==
- Deneb, α Cygni
- Deneb (disambiguation)
