= Citroën C-Métisse =

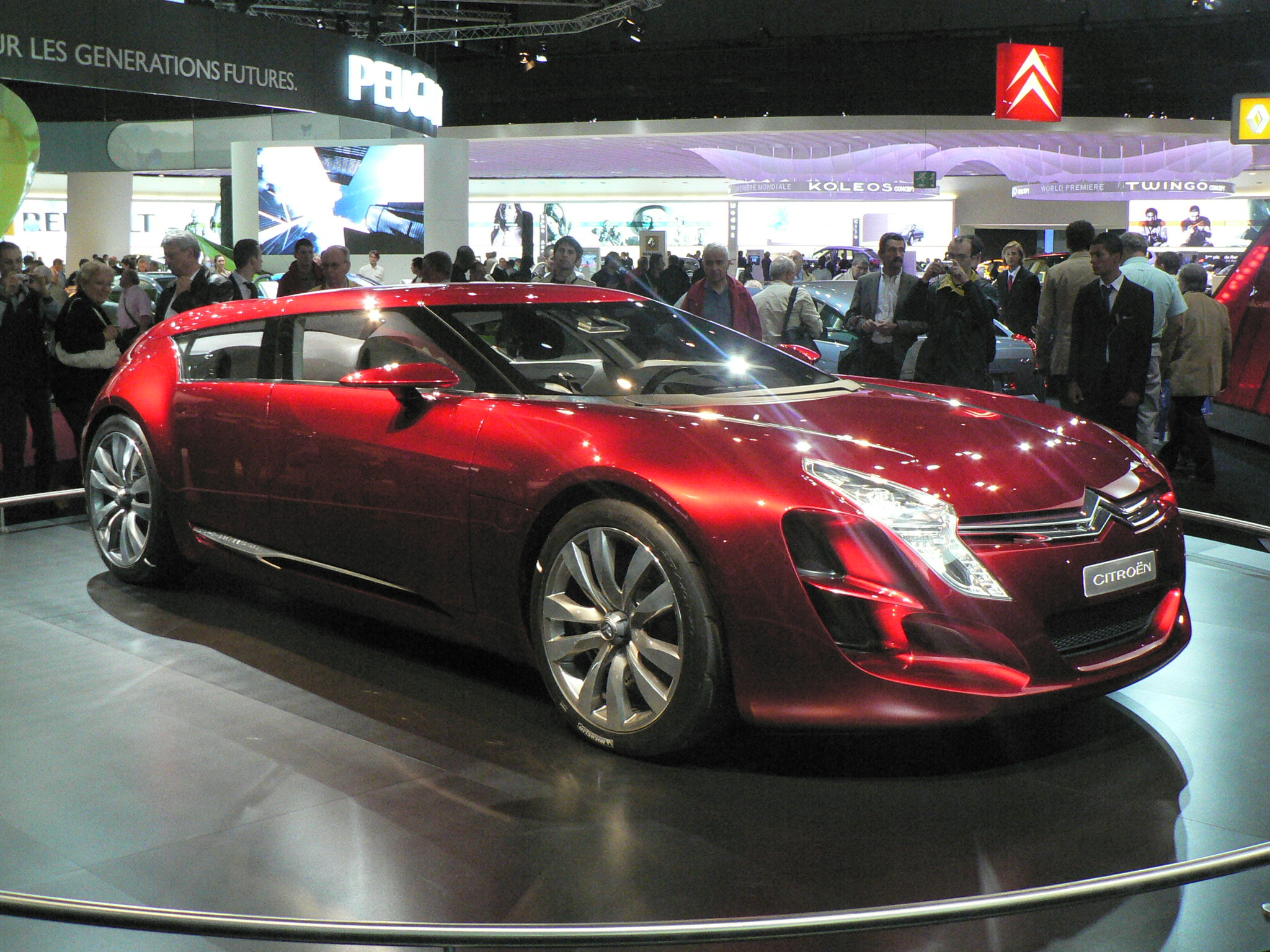

Overview
- Manufacturer: Citroën; Stola
- Production: 2006 (Concept car)

Body and chassis
- Class: Concept car
- Body style: 5 door (2+2) shooting brake
- Layout: Front engine, all wheel drive
- Doors: butterfly doors (front) suicide scissor doors (rear)

Powertrain
- Engine: 2.7 L DT17 diesel V6
- Electric motor: 2x TM4 (wheels hub motors)

Dimensions
- Length: 4.74 metres (186.6 in)
- Height: 1.24 metres (48.8 in)

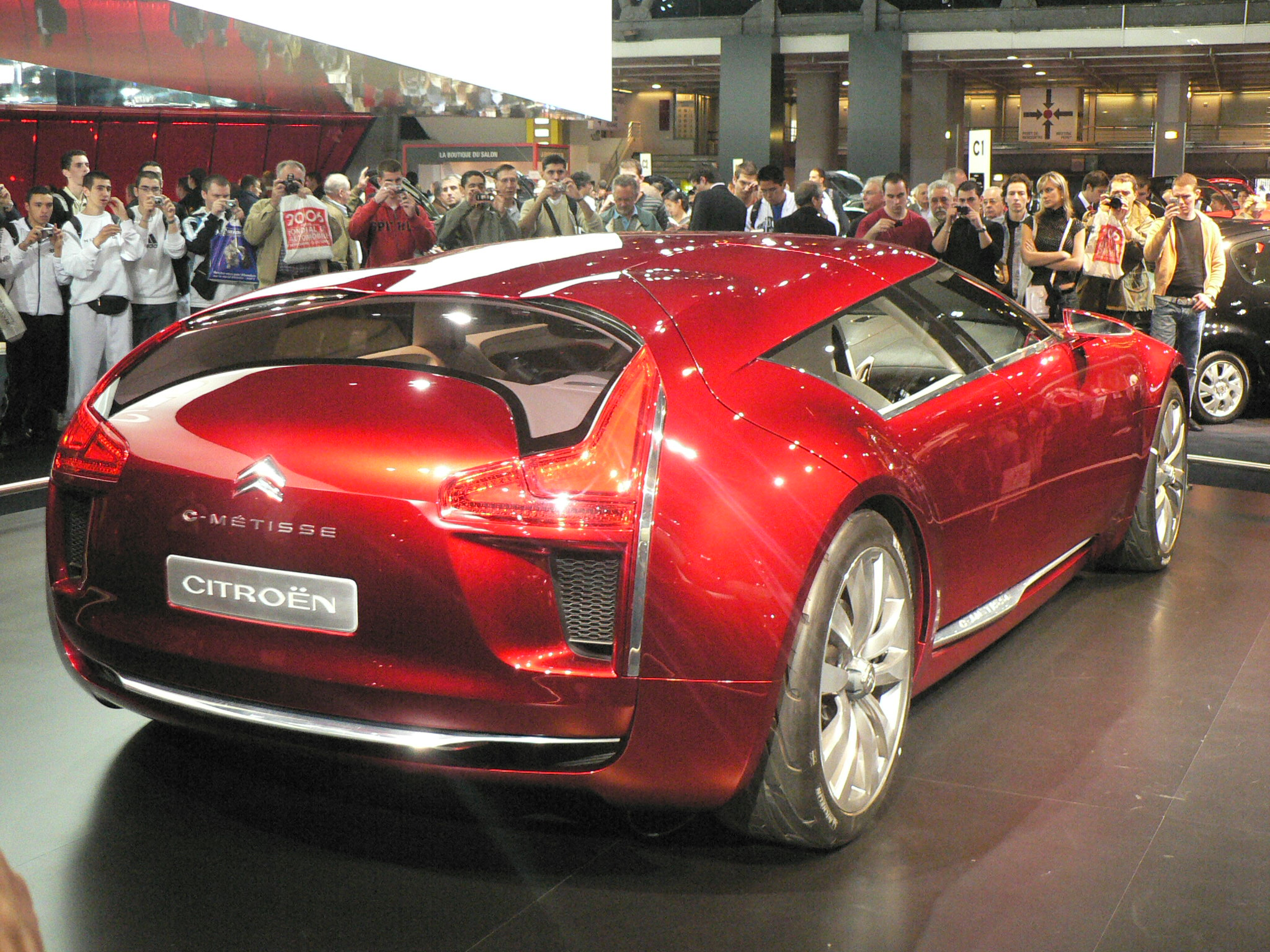
Rear view

The Citroën C-Métisse is a concept car which was produced by the car manufacturer Citroën in collaboration with coachbuilder Stola. It was first introduced in the autumn of 2006 at the Paris Motor Show. It has been stated that the reason for creating such a car was to show that any hybrid car can have the same performance as any petrol or diesel-powered car.

The car is designed as a five-door 2+2 shooting brake. The first official pictures were revealed in September 2006. This is not the first time that Citroën has produced a hybrid car; in January 2006, they revealed the hybrid-powered version of the Citroën C4 alongside the hybrid-powered Peugeot 307. The car can use front-wheel, rear-wheel and all-wheel drive depending on the situation.

== Specifications ==
- Engine: 2.7 L V6 diesel with 208 hp (155 kW) on the front axles and two electric-wheel motors, by TM4 Electrodynamic Systems, with 20 hp (15 kW) on the rear axles
- 0–100 km/h (0–62 mph): 6.2 s
- Top Speed: 250 km/h (155 mph)
- Fuel Consumption: 6.5 litres per 100 kilometres (43 mpg_{‑imp}; 36 mpg_{‑US})

== See also ==
- List of hybrid vehicles
