= 3dvia =

Computer software company

3DVIA
- Type: Public
- Founded: 2007; 19 years ago
- Headquarters: Paris, France and Waltham, Massachusetts
- Key people: Bernard Charlès
- Number of employees: 7,459
- Website: www.3ds.com/products/3dvia

3DVIA is a brand of Dassault Systèmes that is focused on the development of 3D authoring, publishing, and hosting tools for professional and consumer markets. The company's products are targeted at manufacturing, design, and marketing professionals.

== Products ==
The 3DVIA Community is a social network for 3D modelers, professionals, and 3D enthusiasts.

3DVIA composer is 3D technical communication software that lets users explain products using existing 3D data. Users can create high-resolution 2D illustrations and 3D animations to support a variety of product deliverables such as technical documentation, 3D work instructions, animated service applications, and sales and marketing collateral.

3DVIA Hosting allows users to host, manage, and access their 3D assets from any web or iOS device at any time.

3DVIA Mobile is a 3D interactive content viewer for iOS platforms (iPhone, iPad, and iPod touch). It uses proprietary technology to take over 30 3D content formats and make them viewable on iOS devices.

3DVIA Shape is a free, online 3D modeling application that lets users create 3D models and share them in the 3D VIA Community. The application targets novice 3D modelers who want to design for recreational purposes, as well as experienced 3D modelers who need to create draft model prototypes.

3DVIA Store is software developed for use by brand manufacturers and retailers. It enables users to realistically simulate retail settings inside immersive 3D environments.

3DVIA Studio is/was an interactive application authoring environment that was designed specifically to accept large CAD data assets and use them within game simulations and training applications. The application has also been used for entertainment titles within entertainment and social gaming.

== History ==
3DVIA was formed in 2007 by Dassault Systèmes with the mission of democratizing 3D technology for use by consumer markets, new media, and non-engineering professional markets. The brand group was created through the collection of several internal projects and the earlier acquisition of Virtools, a gaming engine and prototyping application.

In 2007, 3dvia.com (renamed from teapotters.com) was released, and it focused on creating a social network and content community for 3D artists and modelers. The site allowed users to upload 3D content in numerous 3D formats and then interactively view them through a web-browser. Later in 2007, the company released a free 3D modeling application called 3DVIA Shape. It was targeted at consumers and used in partnership with the Microsoft Virtual Earth program. The Microsoft Virtual Earth Shape version of the product was released as the official 3D modeling application for Microsoft's 3D globe application.

The 3DVIA brand was further expanded in 2007 through the acquisition of Seemage. Rebranded as 3DVIA Composer, the Seemage product line focused on re-purposing existing product design data for the creation of 2D and 3D product communications including technical illustrations, 3D animations, and interactive online applications.

3DVIA moved into the mobile market in 2008 with the release of 3DVIA Mobile, one of the first 3D model viewers on iOS. 3DVIA Mobile allowed users to view 3D models in an interactive view on an Apple iPhone and connected them to their content hosted on 3DVIA.com.

In early 2009, 3DVIA released 3DVIA Virtools Version 5, they offered a development environment to create 3D real-time applications and related services, targeted at system integrators, game studios and corporate end-users.

The brand extended its reach into the indie-game market with the release of a free real-time game engine called 3DVIA Studio in March 2010. The product game users the ability to create and publish interactive 3D games and experiences to Facebook and 3dvia.com. It also allowed users to purchase content for use in their projects from the 3DVIA Market, an eCommerce service for 3D content, launched at the same time on 3dvia.com.

In June 2011, 3DVIA Hosting, a 3D file sharing service, was released.
