= Deneb Kaitos =

Deneb Kaitos may refer to the following stars in the constellation Cetus:

- Beta Ceti
- Iota Ceti

== See also ==
- Deneb, α Cygni
- Deneb (disambiguation)
