= Deneb Robotics =

Defunct American software company

- Industry: CAD, CAM
- Founded: 1985; 41 years ago
- Defunct: 1997; 29 years ago
- Fate: acquired
- Successor: DELMIA
- Headquarters: Auburn Hills, Michigan
- Key people: Scott Walter, Jay Harrison, Nathan Yoffa, Rakesh Mahajan
- Products: Igrip
- Owner: Dassault Systèmes

Deneb Robotics was a company founded by Scott Walter, Jay Harrison, Nathan Yoffa, and Rakesh Mahajan in 1985. The company pioneered graphics-based 3D factory simulation software for simulation and digital manufacturing tools. The application area reached from concept development to shop floor implementation, including off-line programming. Deneb Robotics is known for their IGRIP, Quest, Ultra and VirtualNC software packages.

The company was acquired by Dassault Systèmes in 1997 and is branded DELMIA. Major companies such as Boeing, and General Motors used Deneb's suite of tools to optimize their design and manufacturing processes.
