= Éric Trappier =

French businessman and engineer (born 1960)

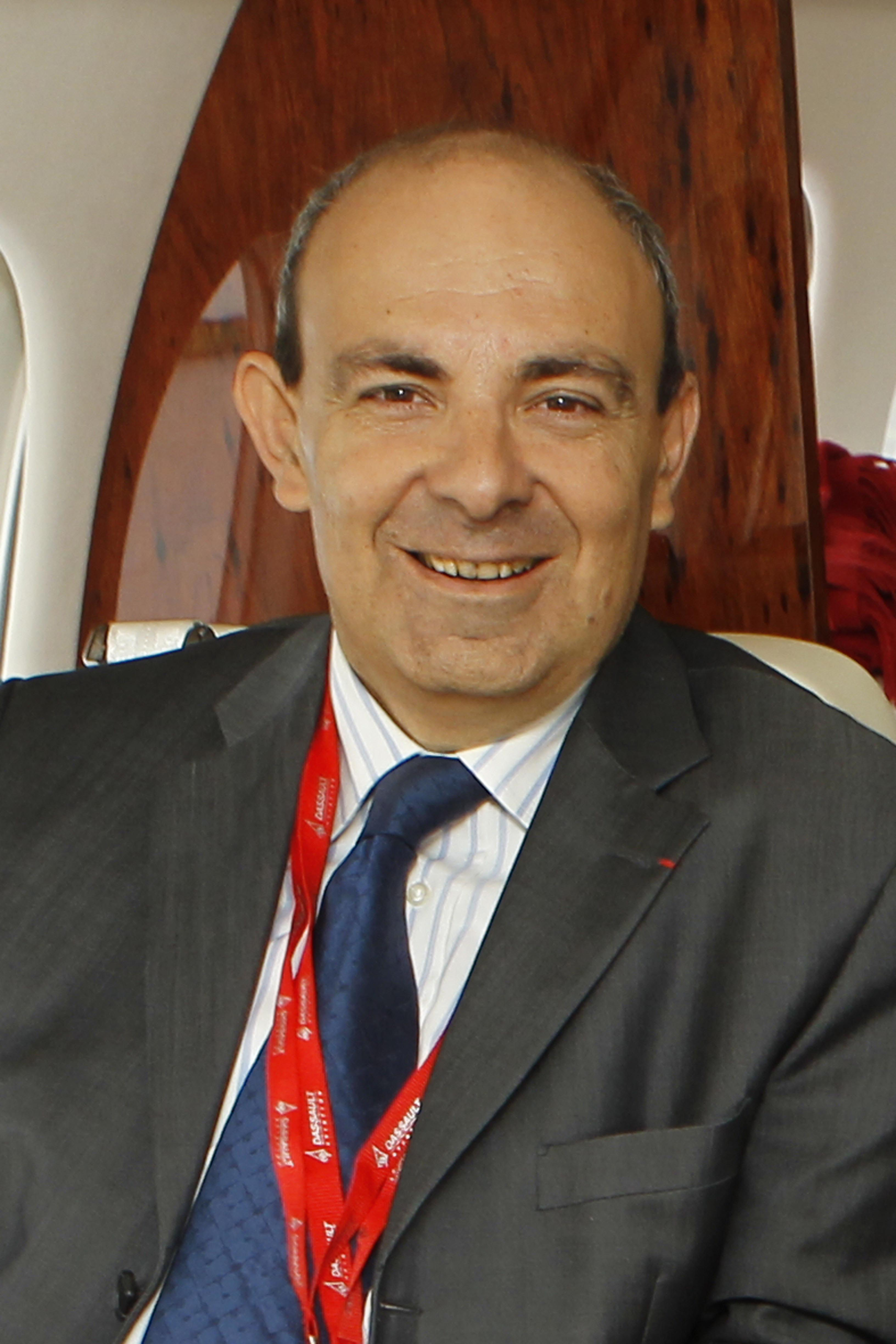
- Born: 6 January 1960 (age 66); Paris, France
- Education: Telecom SudParis (engineer's degree, 1983)
- Occupation: CEO of Dassault Aviation (2013–present)

Éric Trappier (French pronunciation: [eʁik tʁapje]; born 6 January 1960) is a French businessman and engineer. Since January 2013, he has been the chief executive officer (CEO) of French aircraft manufacturer Dassault Aviation, a subsidiary of the Dassault Group. In 2025, Trappier became the chairman of Groupe Industriel Marcel Dassault, the Dassault family's holding company.

== Early life and career ==
Trappier was born and raised in Paris. He received an engineering degree from Telecom SudParis in 1983. He joined Dassault Aviation soon after graduation (1984). He has spent most of his career in the defense sector. He was named the company's international sales manager in 2002, and international general manager in 2006. He served as international executive vice president of the company before being named to the CEO position. He replaced Charles Edelstenne in that position when Edelstenne reached the company's mandatory retirement age (75).

In May 2017, the AeroSpace and Defence Industries Association of Europe announced the appointment of Trappier as its president.

On 8 June 2017, the executive committee of the French Aerospace Industries Association GIFAS elected Trappier, the incumbent first deputy chairman of GIFAS, as the new chairman of GIFAS.

Trappier was disappointed by the failure of a deal to build a multi-national technology demonstrator of a combat drone for $2.5 billion because the British government pulled the subsidy. The project had been stalled for six years already to date.

In March 2021, Trappier said that the Future Combat Air System (FCAS) project and the British-Swedish-Italian Tempest project would not be merged. In the words of another journalist, in the same interview Trappier "delivered a stinging rebuke" to his partner Airbus.

In June 2022, Trappier called for mediation in discussions he was having over the three-party intra-European conglomeration that aimed to build the FCAS fighter jet.

In December 2022, the three governments of the FCAS project partners approved Phase 1B in a €3.2 billion subsidy.

Trappier announced that over the 2022 year, his company had secured contracts for 156 Rafales, including 92 orders for export. More than half of these were sold to the United Arab Emirates.

In January 2023, Trappier complained that the Russo-Ukrainian war and attendant sanctions created problems in the European supply chain of some materials and energy.

In March 2023, Trappier insisted that Dassault be the lead contractor (instead of Airbus) for the FCAS.

In May 2023, Dassault was seen to be advancing work on the next-generation Rafale fighter jet in spite of the FCAS partnership it had signed with the Germans and the Spanish.

In May 2023, Trappier railed against the Commission of the European Union because they had excluded business jets from their list of "green industries" which "can be considered sustainable investments" and thus would be removed from subsidy. He argued that sustainable aviation fuel is a panacea.

In January 2025, Trappier was appointed the chairman of the Dassault family's holding company, Groupe Industriel Marcel Dassault, which controls the family's entire business holdings. He replaced Edelstenne in the position.

== Positions ==
=== Positions in the group ===
- Chairman and chief executive officer of Dassault Aviation.

=== Other positions outside the group ===
Outside the group, Eric Trappier is:

- President and administrator of the French Aerospace Industries Association GIFAS (Groupement des Industries Françaises Aéronautiques et Spatiales)
- Chairman of CIDEF (Council of French Defense Industries – Conseil des Industries de Défense Françaises).
- Administrator of Thales Group
- Administrator GIE Rafale International
- Administrator ODAS, SOFEMA, Eurotradia
- President of AeroSpace and Defence Industries Association of Europe.

Business positions
Preceded by Charles Edelstenne	CEO of Dassault Aviation; 2013–present	Succeeded by Incumbent
