= Lion Electric Company =

Canadian bus and truck manufacturer

- Native name: La Compagnie Électrique Lion
- Formerly: Autobus Lion
- Traded as: NYSE: LEV (formerly); TSX: LEV (formerly); OTCQX: LEVGQ
- Industry: Commercial vehicles
- Founded: 2011
- Headquarters: Saint-Jérôme, Quebec, Canada
- Area served: Canada
- Key people: Marc Bédard and Camile Chartrand
- Products: Buses and trucks
- Production output: 852 (2023)
- Services: Bus and truck manufacturing
- Revenue: ▲US$253.5 million (2023)
- Operating income: ▼US$−114.0 million (2023)
- Net income: ▼US$−103.7 million (2023)
- Total assets: ▲US$841.1 million (2023)
- Total equity: ▼US$358.9 million (2023)
- Owner: Marc Bédard and Camile Chartrand
- Number of employees: 1,400 (2023)
- Website: www.thelionelectric.com

LION (previously Lion Electric Company/La Compagnie Électrique Lion) is a Canadian electric vehicle manufacturer headquartered in Saint-Jérôme, Quebec. Founded in 2011 as Lion Bus (Autobus Lion), the company is primarily known for its production of yellow school buses, of which it was the first to mass produce as a fully electric vehicle.

The company was renamed LION in the summer of 2025, following its emergence from creditor protection and bankruptcy and its purchase by a group of investors. During the early 2020s, the company also developed multiple product lines, including electrified transit buses and commercial truck chassis and semitractors.

Since its founding, the company has assembled vehicles at its facility in Saint-Jérôme, Quebec; the company also produced buses in Joliet, Illinois from 2023 to 2024.

== History ==
=== Autobus Lion (2011–2017) ===
The first school bus manufacturer founded in North America in the 21st century, Autobus Lion/Lion Bus is also the first manufacturer of full-size school buses in Canada since the closure of Les Enterprises Michel Corbeil in 2007. Lion Bus was created in 2008 by former Corbeil executives Marc Bédard and Camile Chartrand (serving as Lion President and retired COO, respectively).

In 2011, the company introduced its first bus, the Lion 360°, a cowled-chassis (conventional style) school bus, produced in a partnership with Spartan Chassis, Inc. In contrast to other manufacturers of full-size buses, the 360 was offered by itself, to streamline production costs.

=== La Compagnie Électrique Lion (2017–2024) ===
In June 2017, Lion Bus rebranded itself as the Lion Electric Company. As part of the transition, the company announced the development of a second bus design, a flat-floor fully electric minibus for school and transit applications (later unveiled as the LionM and LionA, respectively). In addition, Lion announced the development of Class 5-8 fully electric trucks, with a planned launch in fall 2018.

In November 2017, Power Energy (a wholly owned subsidiary of Power Corporation Canada), announced a major investment in Lion Electric. In the summer of 2018, the company established a base of operations in central California.

In 2021, Lion announced a new manufacturing facility in Joliet, Illinois to produce its electric buses and trucks, and became a public company by merging with a special-purpose acquisition company (SPAC). In May 2021, Lion received an order from First Student for 260 electric buses, its largest order at that point.

The company stated in December 2024 that it was entering creditor protection in Canada and Chapter 15 bankruptcy in the US, as it defaulted on its debt; Lion laid off 920 employees during the year, including a temporary layoff of 400 employees at the Illinois plant.

=== LION (2025–present) ===
As Lion entered creditor protection at the end of 2024, the company announced that all remaining production was focused on producing and delivering outstanding vehicle orders, with the company placing itself for sale to finance further restructuring and avoid complete closure. In February 2025, Lion was introduced to a class-action lawsuit in Canada from its shareholders, claiming it misrepresented the stability of its finances; after 2023, the company stock had collapsed in price, becoming virtually worthless. In the same month in the United States, a law firm began an investigation into Lion in an effort to determine whether the company committed securities fraud, coinciding with an EPA investigation into the catastrophic failure of multiple Lion EV buses placed into service in Maine.

Following nearly $180M CDN of investment from Quebec, the province ended financial support of the company at the end of April 2025.

In May 2025, the sale of the company was completed for $6M CDN to a group of investors led by a Lion director and a real-estate developer, with the company changing its name to the capitalized LION. The restructure brought a number of changes, as the company sold off its manufacturing facilities in the United States and its battery-pack production facility. LION also ended development and production of its Lion6 and Lion8 commercial trucks to focus entirely on school bus production (moving entirely to the LionC and LionD lines). In another change, the revived company made an extensive retraction on its focus market; along with pulling out of the United States entirely, LION has also currently centered its regrowth entirely on its home province of Quebec. The company has faced ongoing challenges, including voided warranties for U.S. customers and incidents of bus fires, leading to further investigations and operational restrictions.

== Products ==
Lion 360 eLion

Overview
- Type: Bus
- Manufacturer: Autobus Lion (2011–2017); La Compagnie Électrique Lion (2017–present)
- Production: 2011–present
- Assembly: Canada: Saint-Jérôme, Québec; United States: Joliet, Illinois (2023–2024)

Body and chassis
- Layout: FR layout, 4x2
- Platform: Spartan Front Engine
- Chassis: Cowled chassis (conventional-style)

Powertrain
- Engine: Cummins 6.7L ISB6.7 diesel I6; NGV Motori 7.6L DT466 CNG I6
- Electric motor: TM4 SUMO MD
- Power output: 250 kW (335 hp)
- Battery: Lithium-ion
- Electric range: 100 mi (161 km)
- Plug-in charging: SAEJ1772

Dimensions
- Wheelbase: 254 in (6,452 mm); 276 in (7,010 mm)
- Width: 101.5 in (2,578 mm)
- Height: 124 in (3,150 mm)

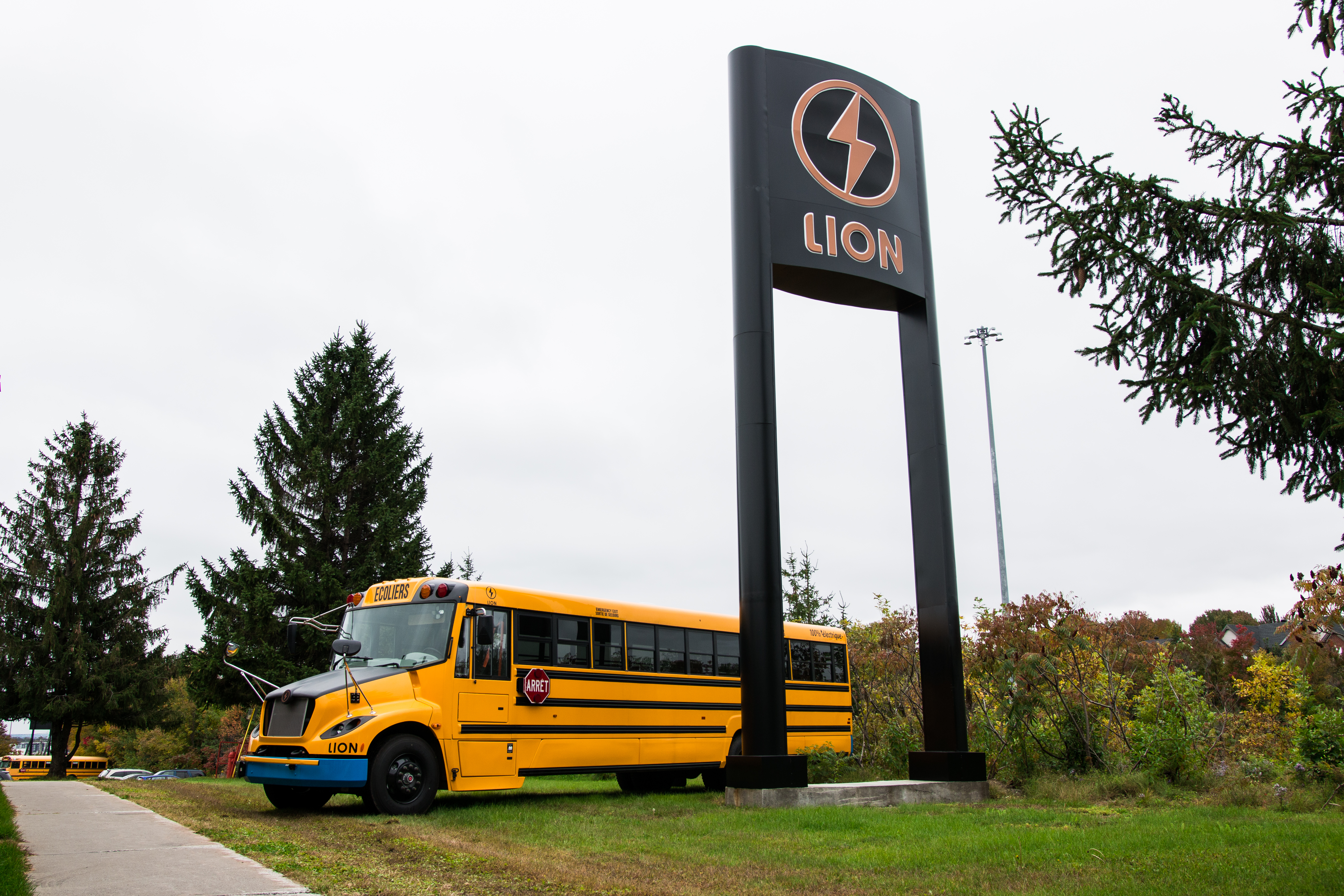
Lion eLion school bus

=== Lion 360° ===
Launched in 2011, the Lion Bus 360° is a cowled-chassis (conventional) bus sold as either a school bus, MFSAB (activity bus), or a commercial-use bus. As with the Blue Bird Vision, the 360 does not use a chassis and hood of a production medium-duty truck, instead having a proprietary chassis developed for the bus by Spartan Chassis (a subsidiary of Spartan Motors, former parent company of Carpenter). Though few body configurations were initially offered (to streamline production), the 360 was offered with options such as wheelchair lifts or underfloor luggage compartments.

In its development, several features of the 360 focused on lengthening the service life of school buses. In the interest of corrosion resistance, the body does not use steel exterior panels, consisting of composite body panels, with the lower bodywork using TPO Thermoplastic olefin panels. In a break from school bus design precedent, the 360 is produced with a 102-inch wide body (rather than 96 inches); the change was intended for either wider center aisles or to better accommodate 3-point seatbelts.

In May 2015, Lion unveiled a CNG-fueled variant of the 360, becoming the first manufacturer to produce a Type C school bus powered by a CNG-fueled engine, a NGV Motori version of the International DT466 engine. It is unclear how many were produced.

=== Lion eLion (LionC) ===
LionC electric school bus, 2024.

Launched in 2015, the eLion is a fully electric vehicle, sharing its body and Spartan chassis with the 360. In place of the Cummins diesel, a 250 KiloWatt TM4 SUMO MD electric motor is used along with LG lithium-ion batteries. The eLion is externally distinguished from the 360 by its colored bumpers, which are either painted blue or green.

=== LionM/LionA/LionD ===
Launched in 2018, the LionM (originally the eLionM) is a low-floor midibus/minibus produced in a 26-foot length. Offering kneeling and an integrated wheelchair ramp, the LionM was developed for transit, paratransit, and shuttle applications. The LionA is a Type A school bus, adopting the axle configuration of a much larger Type D bus. with a larger school bus called LionD.

The LionM and LionA are equipped with either one or two 80 kWh LG Chem lithium-ion battery packs mounted below the floor, allowing for either a 75-mile or 150-mile driving range. Alongside a 19.2 kW J1777 charger, DC fast-charging is an option, along with battery swapping.

=== Lion8 ===
Introduced in March 2019, the Lion8 is a Class 8 fully electric truck, produced in a cabover configuration. Developed primarily for urban and vocational use, the Lion8 currently has a range of 250 miles. It is equipped with a 470 hp (350 kW) TM4 SUMO HD electric motor and a 480 kWh battery.

== See also ==
- School bus
- Spartan Motors - chassis supplier
