= Dassault Group =

French aerospace and software company

Groupe Industriel Marcel Dassault SAS
- Company type: Private
- Industry: investment funds and similar financial entities
- Founded: 1929; 97 years ago
- Founder: Marcel Dassault (born Marcel Bloch)
- Headquarters: Rond-point des Champs-Élysées-Marcel-Dassault, Paris, France
- Key people: Laurent Dassault; Éric Trappier
- Revenue: €41.1 billion (2018)
- Owner: Dassault family
- Number of employees: 23,400 (2010)
- Website: www.dassault.fr

Groupe Industriel Marcel Dassault SAS (French pronunciation: [daso]; also GIM Dassault or Dassault Group) is a French corporate group established in 1929 with the creation of Société des Avions Marcel Bloch (now Dassault Aviation) by Marcel Dassault, later led by his son Serge Dassault, and led from 2018 to 2025 by co-founder of Dassault Systèmes, Charles Edelstenne. Since 2025, the group has been led by Éric Trappier, who is also the Chairman and CEO of Dassault Aviation.

According to Challenges, the Dassault family's combined net worth is estimated at around 23.5 billion euros.

== Subsidiaries ==
- Dassault Aviation
  - Dassault Falcon Jet
  - Dassault Falcon Service
  - Sogitec (simulation and integrated logistic support systems)
- Dassault Systèmes (software and PLM development solutions)
- Société de Véhicules Electriques (SVE), a joint venture between Dassault and Heuliez for the development of electric and plug-in electric hybrid vehicles (Cleanova II based on Renault Kangoo), its president and CEO is Gérard Thery. In 2010, Dow Kokam LLC acquired SVE, though Dassault Group still holds a minor share.
- Groupe Figaro (media, including Le Figaro and L'Internaute)
- Immobilière Dassault—an office and residential real estate firm focusing on properties in Paris, all revenues of which are generated in France
- Artcurial (auctions)
  - Arqana (thoroughbred auctions) (30%)
- Château Dassault (wine)
- Veolia
- SABCA
