= Bernard Charlès =

French business executive (born 1957)

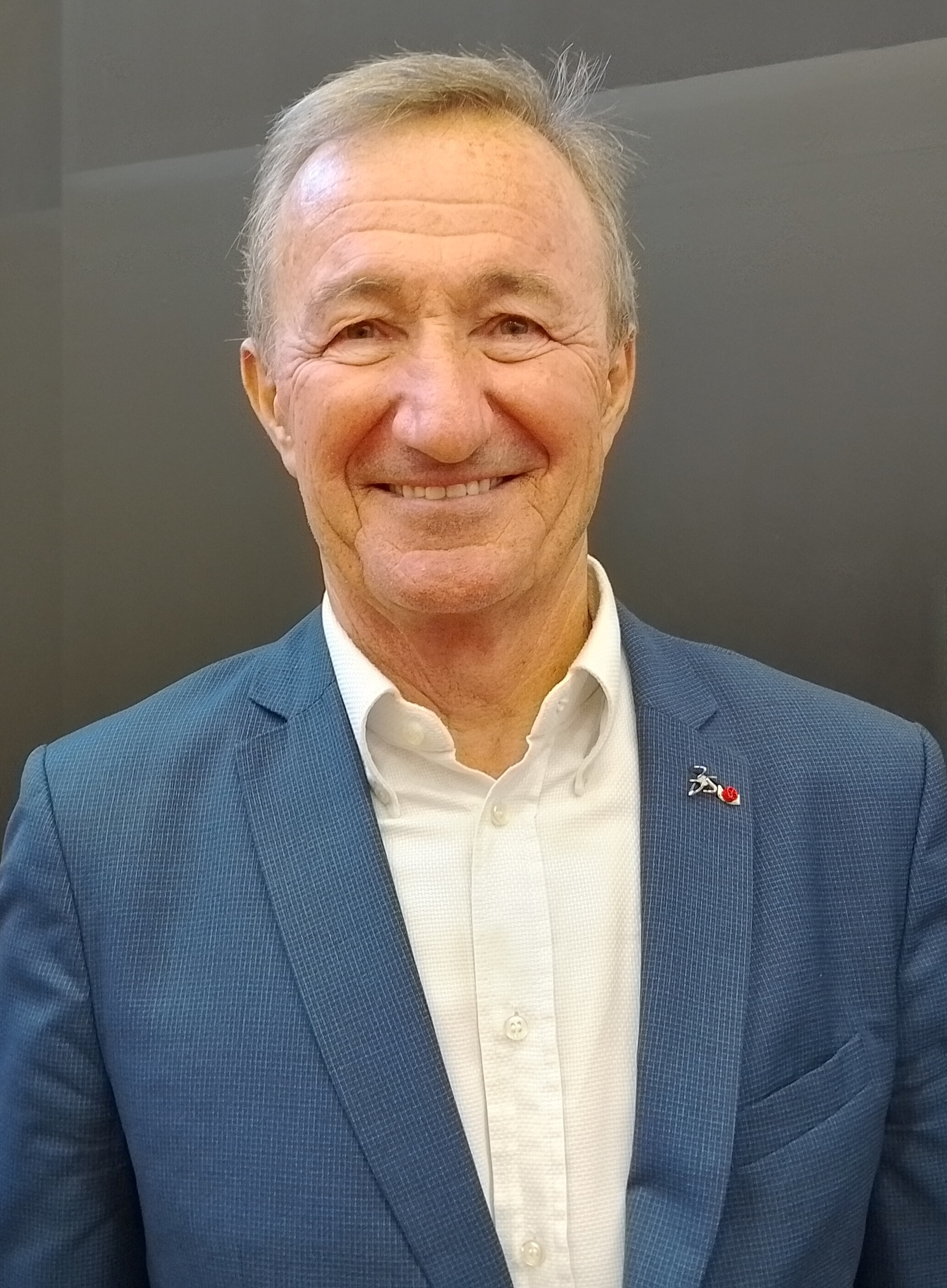
- Born: 30 March 1957; Brittany
- Occupation: Businessperson
- Employer: Dassault Systèmes (1983–)
- Awards: Officer of the Legion of Honor (2012); Commander of the Legion of Honour (2021)

Bernard Charlès (born 1957) is a French business executive. He is the former Chairman of the board of directors of Dassault Systèmes. Charlès was the 13th best-performing CEO in the world according to the Harvard Business Review 2017 ranking. In 2018 Dassault Systèmes was named the most sustainable corporation in the world in the Global 100 Most Sustainable Corporations in the World index by Corporate Knights.

== Early life and education ==
Bernard Charlès was born and grew up in Brittany, France.

He is a graduate from the Ecole Normale Supérieure engineering school in Cachan (ENS Cachan) and has a PhD in mechanical engineering majoring in automation engineering and information science. He also holds an agrégation — the most senior teaching qualification achievable in France (specializing in mechanical engineering).

== Professional career ==
Bernard Charlès joined Dassault Systèmes in 1983 to develop new design technology – less than two years after the company was created. In 1986 he founded a New Technologies, Research and Strategy department. In 1988 he was named to the position of President of Strategy, Research & Development.

In 1989, he initiated the creation of the digital mock-up (DMU), complete virtual 3D model of a product that replaced physical prototypes.

Charlès was appointed president and chief executive officer of Dassault Systèmes in September 1995. In 1996, he became a member of the board of directors. The same year he organized the flotation of Dassault Systèmes on the stock market.

In 2000, with the idea of Product Lifecycle Management (PLM), he extended the concept of the digital mock-up to the entire lifecycle of a product. In parallel he made a series of acquisitions and brand creation: ENOVIA in 1998, DELMIA in 2000 and SIMULIA in 2005. To reinforce the company's business scope and sales capabilities, he decided to acquire SolidWorks in 1997, and to gain control of Dassault Systèmes’ entire distribution network, previously managed by IBM.

In 2012, with 3DEXPERIENCE, Charlès announced a new vision for the company based on the idea that 3D should also include the simulation of the consumer experience. He set a specific purpose to “The 3DEXPERIENCE Company”: “Dassault Systèmes provides business and people with 3DEXPERIENCE universes to imagine sustainable innovations capable of harmonizing product, nature and life.”

To support this ambition, he carried on an acquisition (Gemcom in 2012, Apriso in 2013, RTT, Quintiq and Accelrys in 2014) and diversification strategy with 3DSWYM for social innovation, EXALEAD and NETVIBES for data intelligence, GEOVIA in the Natural Resources sector, 3DVIA for a B2C approach, BIOVIA for virtual biosphere and materials, and 3DEXCITE for real-time, high-end visualizations.

In May 2016, he was named vice-president of the board of directors of Dassault Systèmes, of which he had become member in 1993.

In January 2022, he took over from Charles Edelstenne as chairman of the board, becoming the chairman and CEO of the company.

Since January 2024, he has been chairman of the board, with Pascal Daloz having taken on the role of CEO of Dassault Systèmes.

Since May 2015, Bernard Charlès has been co-leading the French government project “Industry of the Future”. This alliance is a group of technology companies, professional associations and academic partners whose mission is to promote the French government's program to digitally transform industry in France.

He is the Honorary Chairman of La Fondation Dassault Systèmes.

Charlès was elected a member of the National Academy of Engineering in 2017 for leadership in providing major software tools for simulation-based engineering.

In February 2026, Charlès stepped down from his position as executive chairman at Dassault Systèmes and was subsequently replaced by CEO Pascal Daloz.

== Honors ==
Bernard Charlès holds the knight of Commander in the French Legion of Honour and is a member of the National Academy of Technologies of France. He is a foreign member of the US National Academy of Engineering.
