= Deneb Karentz =

Marine biology professor

- Education: BS University of Rhode Island; MS Oregon State University; PhD University of Rhode Island
- Scientific career
- Fields: Marine biology Ozone depletion
- Workplaces: Professor, University of San Francisco
- Thesis: Patterns and rates of DNA synthesis and cell division in marine dinoflagellates (1982)
- Website: Deneb Karentz at University of San Francisco

Deneb Karentz is full-time faculty, professor, and former chair of the Biology Department at University of San Francisco. Her research focuses on the ultraviolet photobiology of marine organisms and understanding their strategies for protection from UV exposure, particularly in relation to the ecological implications of Antarctic ozone depletion.

== Early life and education ==
Karentz grew up in Millis, Massachusetts, the daughter of Rose and Varoujan Karentz, and turned to athletics in high school as a two-sport captain to complement a proud academic standing. Karentz earned her BS at the University of Rhode Island in 1973, MS at Oregon State University in 1976 and PhD at the University of Rhode Island in 1982. Her graduate research focused on the physiology and ecology of marine phytoplankton. She has lived in San Francisco, California since 1983. She held an NIH National Service Award Fellowship for post-doctoral research at the Laboratory of Radiobiology and Environmental Health, University of California San Francisco from 1983-1986. She worked in the lab of James E. Cleaver, conducting research on the molecular genetics of an inherited human disease, xeroderma pigmentosum (XP). Patients afflicted with XP are extremely sensitive to sunlight and are unable to repair UV-induced damage to DNA. Karentz remained at UCSF as a research biologist until hired as a professor of Biology and Environmental Science at the University of San Francisco in 1992.

== Career and impact ==
Karentz became involved in Antarctic research in 1986 as a volunteer on a field team studying the photophysiology of springtime phytoplankton in McMurdo Sound. Karentz's research focuses on the ultraviolet photobiology of marine organisms: identifying strategies for protection from UV exposure and understanding mechanisms for repair of UV–induced damage. Her work has focused on investigating the ecological implications of Antarctic ozone depletion. Over the past 30 years, she has made the trip to Antarctica over 20 times.

From 1986 - 2016 her research has been conducted at Palmer and McMurdo Stations, and aboard several research cruises in the Bellingshausen Sea and the Ross Sea. Since 1994 she has also been an instructor for the NSF advanced international integrative biology course taught at McMurdo Station and Palmer Station for early career scientists from across the world. She served for two years as the associate program manager for the Biology and Medicine Program at the U.S. National Science Foundation Office of Polar Programs. She has served as a U.S. representative to the Group on Life Sciences for the Scientific Committee on Antarctic Research, and is currently the second US delegate to SCAR. She is also (since 2011) a private sector advisor for the US delegation to the Committee on Environmental Protection under the Antarctic Treaty System.

== Awards and honors ==
An Antarctic ice-covered lake, Lake Karentz, was named after her in 2005 by the U.S. Board of Geographic Names in recognition of her contribution to the study of Antarctica. In 1992 she was awarded the Luigi Provasoli Award for Outstanding Paper in the Journal of Phycology (1991-1992) from the Phycological Society of America for Karentz, D., J.E. Cleaver and D.M. Mitchell. 1991. Cell survival characteristics and molecular responses of Antarctic phytoplankton to ultraviolet-B radiation exposure. Journal of Phycology 27:326-341.
