= Charles Edelstenne =

French businessman (born 1938)

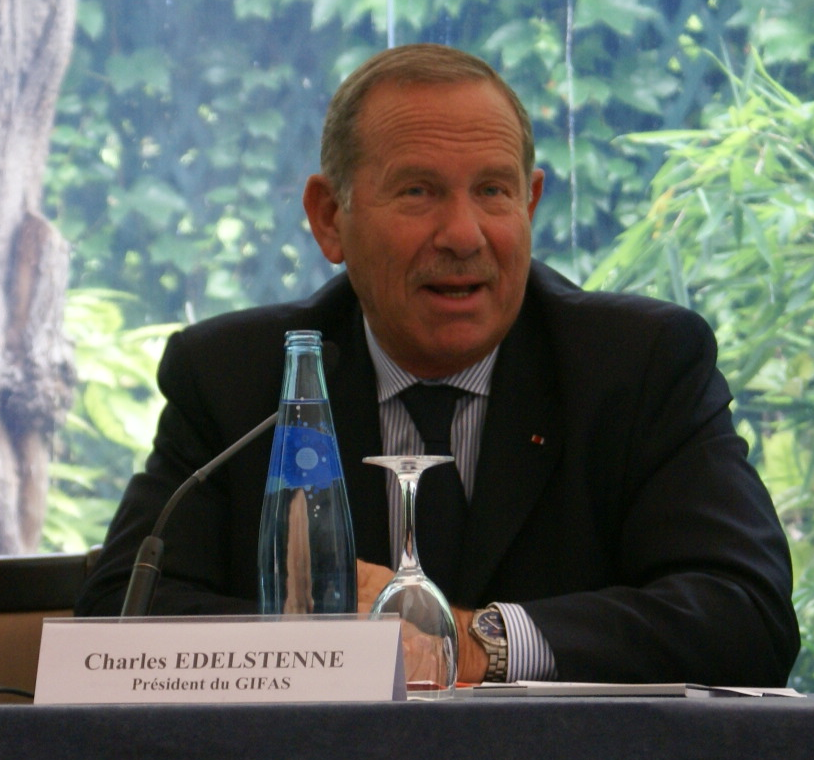
- Born: 9 January 1938 (age 88); Paris, France
- Occupations: General manager of Dassault Group, chairman of Dassault Systèmes

Charles Edelstenne (born 9 January 1938) is a French businessman. Edelstenne was the general manager of the Dassault Group, before being replaced by Éric Trappier in 2025. He was the CEO of Dassault Aviation until 2025, when he replaced by Trappier in 2013, and he is also the chairman of Dassault Systèmes.

Trained as a French chartered accountant, he joined Dassault Aviation, then called Avions Marcel Dassault-Breguet Aviation in 1960 as chief financial officer (CFO). In 1975, he became general secretary of Dassault, then vice president in 1986. He replaced Serge Dassault as Dassault CEO in 2000. From 1993 to 2002, he was chairman and CEO of Dassault Systèmes. Since he became CEO of Dassault Aviation, he resigned as CEO of Dassault Systèmes but remains its chairman.

He was president of the French GIFAS (Groupement des Industries Françaises Aéronautiques et Spatiales) from 2005 to 2009, followed by Jean-Paul Herteman.

He and his family own just over 6% of Dassault Systèmes' capital.

== Honors and awards ==
- Commander of the Order of Legion of Honour
- Officer of the Ordre National du Mérite
