= Cleanova =

Set of plug-in hybrid vehicles

Cleanova is a set of plug-in hybrid vehicles by the Société de Véhicules Electriques (SVE), a joint venture between Dassault, Heuliez and Hydro-Québec. Cleanova II is based on Renault Kangoo. In January 2010, SVE was taken over by Dow Kokam (USA Dow Chemical and US-Korean Townsend Kokam). In 2009, Dow Kokam received a $161 million U.S. Department of Energy Grant for Next-Generation Battery Production for the hybrid and electric vehicle markets. The Michigan-based facility - Townsend Kokam Advanced Battery - is expected to produce enough batteries to supply 60,000 hybrid or electric vehicles per year. Three battery technologies are used in the Cleanova: Li-Mn_{2}O_{4}, Li-FePO_{4}, and Li-NiCoAl, with storage capacity adjustable to customer needs (16 to 30 kWh). Half the battery capacity can be restored within 30 minutes.

Speeds of up to 130 km/h (81 mph) can be achieved in electric mode.

The French postal services company "la Poste" ordered some 500 Kangoo Cleanova's.

== Electric vehicle ==
In this version, the battery charges exclusively from the mains.

== Plug-ins ==
Plug-in hybrid with three modes:

- All-electric
- Series
- Parallel

The driver can switch manually between the three modes.

The powertrain can deliver up to 100 kW (130 hp).

== Autolib ==
Payment for bike and car hire schemes with ticketing systems for traditional modes of public transport are under development. Two electric vehicle manufacturers are said to be planning to supply cars: the Dassault Group and Bolloré. The former has a vehicle called the Cleanova, which adopts the body of the Renault Kangoo van, while Bolloré's Bluecar has been developed with Italian styling house Pininfarina and was planned to go on sale commercially in 2009.

== See also ==
- Vélib'
