= CADAM =

CAD-related software

- Developer: Dassault Systèmes
- Release: 1977
- Stable release: CADAM Drafting V5-6 R2019 SP2 / Oct 03, 2019
- Operating system: AIX, HP-UX, SGI-[IRIX], SunOS, Windows, MS-DOS
- Website: www.cadam.com

CADAM (computer-augmented design and manufacturing) is CAD-related software that was developed by Lockheed. CADAM was originally written for IBM mainframes and later ported to UNIX workstations, including the IBM RT PC. A variant of CADAM called Micro CADAM was developed for MS-DOS.

== History ==
- 1977: IBM agreed to sell CADAM to aerospace companies.
- 1981: CADAM Release 18.3 was released. It provided support for IBM mainframes running VM/CMS.
- 1983: CADAM Inc is formed as a subsidiary of Lockheed Corp.
- 1985: CADAM Inc successfully sued Adage over the CADAM look-and-feel. It was one of the first look-and-feel court cases.
- 1987: CADAM Inc and SDRC won a massive GM C4 benchmark. CADAM agreed to port Professional CADAM to Sun, Apollo and HP.
- 1989: CADAM Inc was sold to IBM. CADAM Inc, an IBM Company, was formed.
- 1990: Microcadam was formed. CADAM Inc developed and enhanced CADAM (mainframes) and Professional CADAM (workstations). Microcadam developed Micro CADAM. Professional CADAM was ported to IBM RS/6000. It was one of the first non-IBM applications for the workstation.
- 1991: There was a decision in the Soules v. CADAM court case.
- 1991: CADAM V3R2 Released - arguably the best release to date.
- 1992: IBM sold CADAM Inc to Dassault Systèmes. This entity is called "Dassault Systèmes of America" (DSA). DSA maintains mainframe CADAM and Professional CADAM. Altium was created. Altium supported Micro CADAM, P-CAD and IBM CAD.
- 1993: An old version of Micro CADAM was made available via a free license for use on DOS PCs. Copies of this free version are still available on the internet.
- 1999/1998: Microcadam became CSC/Microcadam.
- 2000: Microcadam closed. Dassault Systèmes assumed support for Microcadam software.
- 2001: Protel took the name Altium.

== Legacy ==
In 2025, an open-source project named CADAM, a text-to-CAD web application, was released on GitHub.
