= Dassault Systèmes =

French software company

Dassault Systèmes SE

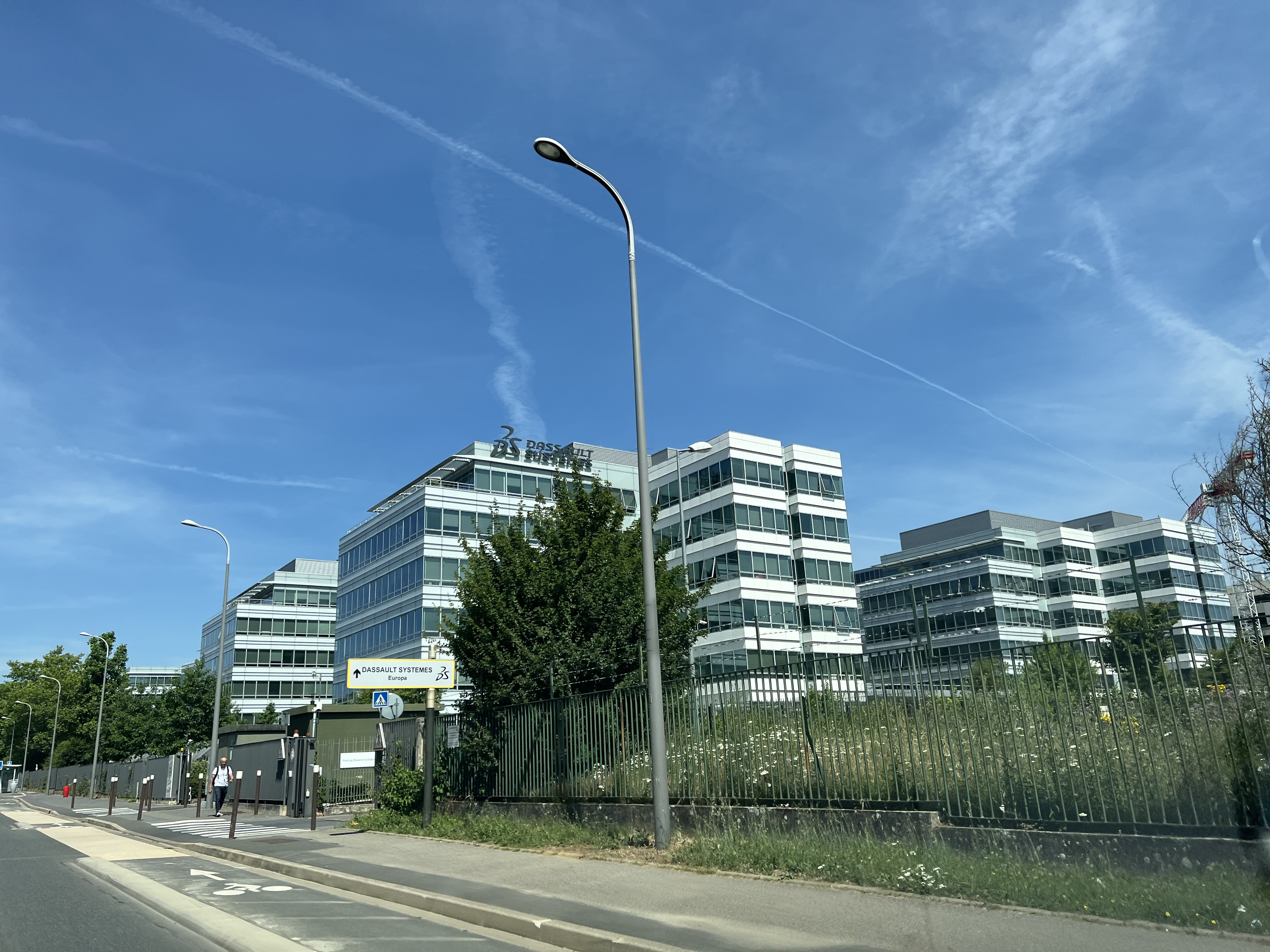
- Type: Public
- Traded as: Euronext Paris: DSY; CAC 40 component; Nasdaq: DAST (former)
- Industry: CAD/CAM/CAE/ PLM Software
- Founded: 1981; 45 years ago
- Founder: Francis Bernard
- Headquarters: Vélizy-Villacoublay, France
- Key people: Charles Edelstenne (honorary chairman); Pascal Daloz (CEO; chairman)
- Products: 3D design software, 3D Digital Mock-up and Product lifecycle management (PLM)
- Revenue: ▲€6.24 billion (2025)
- Operating income: ▲€1.35 billion (2025)
- Net income: ▼€1.20 billion (2025)
- Total assets: ▲€15.05 billion (2025)
- Total equity: ▲€8.79 billion (2025)
- Number of employees: 25,000 (2025)
- Parent: Dassault Group
- Website: 3ds.com

Dassault Systèmes SE (French pronunciation: [daso sistɛm]) (abbreviated 3DS) is a French multinational software corporation which develops software for 3D product design, simulation, manufacturing and other 3D related products.

Founded in 1981, it is headquartered in Vélizy-Villacoublay, France, and has 25,000 employees across 184 global offices.

== History ==
=== 1980s ===
Dassault Systèmes (also known as 3DS) grew out of the aerospace industry's search for more sophisticated drafting tools to streamline the development process and aid in the increasing complexity of aviation design. Dassault Systèmes spun out in 1981 (as part of Dassault Group) to develop and market their 3D surface design software CATI, later renamed CATIA. That same year, Dassault Systèmes signed a sales and marketing agreement with IBM, allowing IBM to resell the CATIA CAD software.

=== 1990s ===
In the 1990s, Dassault Systèmes' software was used to develop seven out of every ten new airplanes and four out of every ten new cars worldwide. Major players in the aviation and automotive industries, including Honda, Mercedes-Benz, BMW and Boeing, were able to design and mock-up their products in CATIA rather than using CAD programs and physical prototypes. The Boeing 777, the Falcon 2000 business jet, and the Rafale jet fighter were designed using CATIA.

Dassault Systèmes launched an initial public offering (IPO) on both the Paris Bourse and Nasdaq in 1996. Following its success, the next year, the company acquired SolidWorks and Deneb Robotics, which later became part of the DELMIA brand, and additional software to build toward product lifecycle management (PLM). The SolidWorks acquisition strengthened Dassault Systèmes' 2D drafting capacity and provided entry into the Microsoft market, while other acquisitions added digital manufacturing software to the product lineup. These acquisitions paved the way for Dassault Systèmes to introduce a total manufacturing system with their subsidiary brand, DELMIA, in 1998. The new offering enabled access to data across the spectrum of manufacturing processes, while remaining independent of the CAD environment.

By the end of 1998, the CAD software industry vendors were devising strategies to become internet-enabled. The main focus was to enable the viewing of 3D models in web browsers and build interfaces to product data management (PDM) systems. Dassault Systèmes was one of the leaders in enabling these functions for its users. The company benefited from their experience integrating CAD software across networks for the Boeing 777 project, and had already made moves toward internet-enabled CAD software in 1996 with CATIA Conferencing Groupware; which enabled review and annotation of models using the internet. The introduction of ENOVIA further marked their industry-leading place by providing internet-enabled PDM and 3D product lifecycle management. Dassault Systèmes' acquisitions continued into 1999, when two CAD software vendors were purchased: Matra Datavision and Smart Solutions. Also in 1999, Dassault Systèmes released CATIA Version 5, which was the first version to be fully implemented in the Microsoft Windows environment.

=== 2000–2011 ===
As the demand for digital and virtual experiences increased in 2000, Dassault Systèmes launched DELMIA, which provides digital manufacturing tools for virtual planning, simulating, and modeling of production processes.

The mid-2000s heralded a series of acquisitions for Dassault Systèmes to improve their product offerings and expand their market reach, and Dassault Systèmes launched new software and tools. In 2005, Dassault Systèmes sought to improve the quality of 3D interactions and simulations. First they acquired Abaqus, a US-based company specializing in software that allows engineers to simulate and observe the performance of components in products.

Then they acquired Virtools, software that enables companies to create 3D applications. The following year, the company extended its market reach into high-tech, consumer products, and medical devices through the acquisition of MatrixOne, which would be linked with ENOVIA. In 2007, subsidiary brand 3DVIA was launched to create a social network and content community for 3D artists and modelers.

=== 2012–2019 ===
As the 2000s progressed, Dassault Systèmes began to enter online applications and build toward more online applications for product data management, collaboration, realistic simulation and more. Examples of this strategy include the purchase or launch of brands such as EXALEAD for information intelligence, NETVIBES for business analytics, 3DEXCITE for marketing, and GEOVIA for modeling the planet. In 2012, the company launched the 3DEXPERIENCE platform to connect its software applications.

CATIA under the 3DEXPERIENCE platform enables users to go beyond physical product definition to model any product in the context of its real-life behavior. Systems, architects, engineers, designers and all contributors collaborate on fit, form, function, and customer experience.

Dassault Systèmes also began to offer its version of digital twins, which the company calls virtual twin experiences and are powered by the 3DEXPERIENCE platform. Virtual twins help companies visualize, model and simulate an entire environment to explore how a product or process will behave when assembled, operated or subjected to a range of events.

To expand their capabilities and industries served through the 3DEXPERIENCE platform, Dassault Systèmes completed additional acquisitions, including:

- Dynasim AB (2006)
- Simpoe S.A.S. (2013)
- Realtime Technology (2014)
- Accelrys (2014)
- Quintiq (2014)
- CST (2016)
- Outscale (majority stake, 2016)
- Centric (majority stake, 2018)
- IQMS (2018)
- Medidata Solutions (2019)
- Argosim

Throughout the decade, Dassault Systèmes advanced into the life sciences and healthcare industry, including launching the Living Heart Project for simulating heart function in 2014 and acquiring subsidiary brand MEDIDATA for managing clinical trials, in 2019.

=== 2020–present ===
In 2020, Dassault Systèmes expanded its focus from “Things to Life” by applying what they have learned over the past four decades and applying it to the human body. By developing a virtual twin experience of the human body, they can model, search, test and treat a human body as precisely, safely and effectively as cars, buildings or airplanes and customize the care of each individual.

To expand the capabilities served through the 3DEXPERIENCE platform, Dassault Systèmes completed additional acquisitions, including:

- NuoDB (2020)
- Proxem (2020)
- Diota (2022)

In late 2022, Dassault Systèmes, along with French companies Docaposte, Bouygues Telecom and Banque des Territoires, announced plans to create Numspot, a joint effort to build a European sovereign cloud service for the financial, health and public sectors that would rely on the infrastructure of 3DS Outscale.

In 2022, the company named Philippine de T'Serclaes as its chief sustainability officer.

In 2024, Korea Fair Trade Commission fined Dassault Systèmes Korea 738 million KRW for imposing policies between October 2016 to December 2020 that disallowed its dealers from prospecting customers already involved in a sales consultation with a different dealer.

In January 2026, Turkey has opened investigation into the company for possible anti competitive practices.

== Products and brands ==
Dassault Systèmes' currently supported roster of brands and industries served (as of May 2024):

3DS Brands
Name	Industry
3DEXCITE	Engagement marketing
3DVIA	Virtual Home Design Software
BIOVIA	Scientific Software
CATIA	Computer-Aided Design
Centric PLM	PLM Software
DELMIA	Manufacturing Operations Software
ENOVIA	PLM Software
GEOVIA	Geology Modeling Software
MEDIDATA	SaaS for Clinical Trials
NETVIBES	Data science
OUTSCALE	Cloud computing
SIMULIA	Simulation Software
SOLIDWORKS	Computer-Aided Design

== Corporate information ==
=== Company management ===
Dassault Systèmes is led by Chief Executive Officer Pascal Daloz. He succeeded Bernard Charlès on January 1, 2024. Charlès, who had held the position since 1995, remained as executive chairman of the board until February 2026, when he stepped down citing personal reasons. Pascal Daloz took the position of board chairman upon Charlès's departure.

=== Market data ===
Groupe Industriel Marcel Dassault owned 39.91 percent of shares in 2025, making it the company's main shareholder; public shares were at 49.38 percent. Other major shareholders included Charles Edelstenne, Bernard Charlès and Pascal Daloz.

=== People and culture ===
Dassault Systèmes has 25,000 employees worldwide. It is headquartered in Vélizy-Villacoublay, France.
