= Labande =

Labande is a surname. Notable people with the surname include:

- Edmond-René Labande (1908–1992), French archivist and historian
- Léon-Honoré Labande (1867–1939), French museum curator, historian, and archivist

== See also ==
- Labandeira
