= Armand Doria =

French aristocrat, art collector and patron

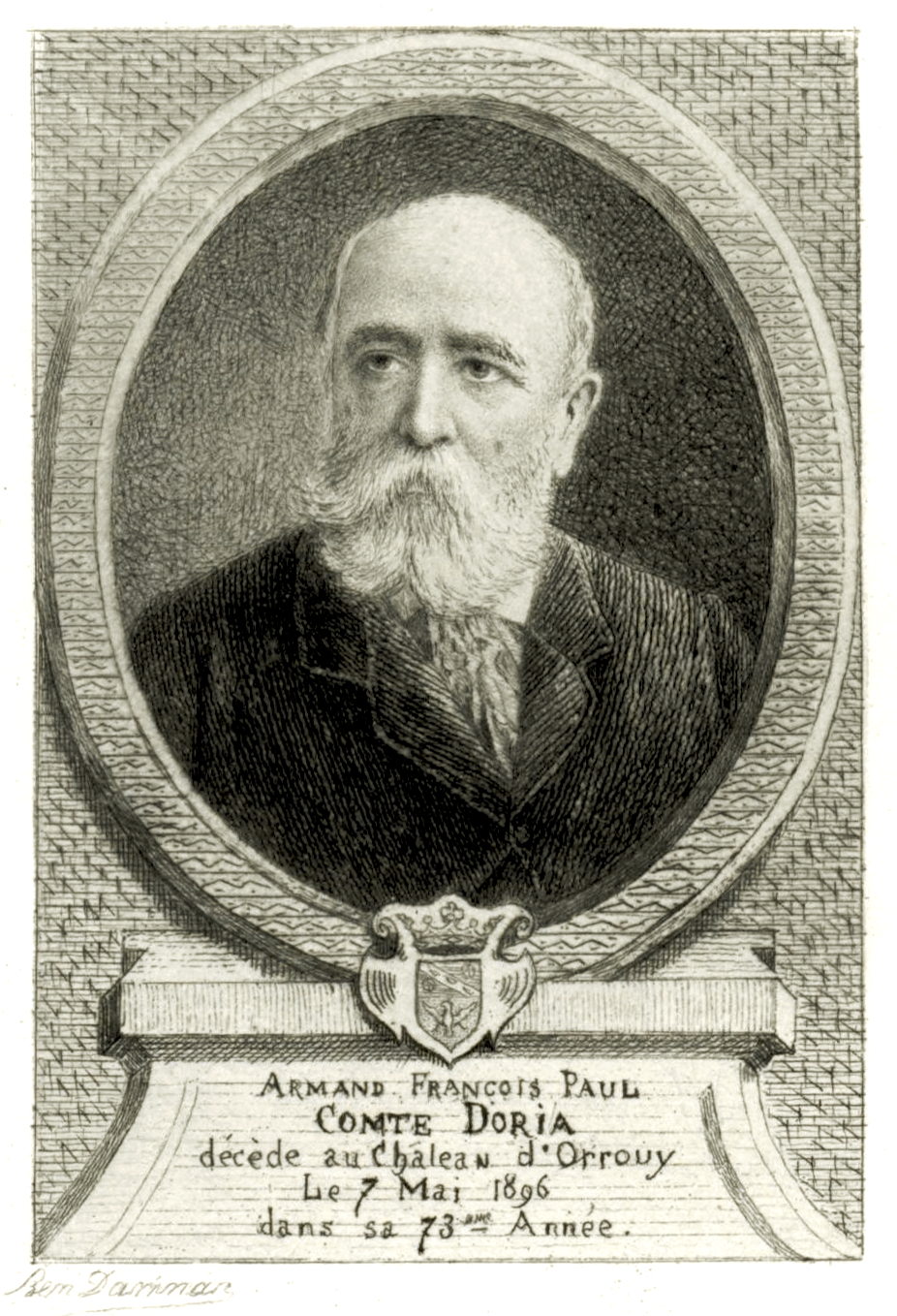
- Born: Armand-François-Paul des Friches Doria; April 24, 1824; Paris, France
- Died: May 7, 1896 (aged 72)
- Occupation: Art collector
- Spouse: Marie-Berthe de Villiers
- Children: 1 son, 1 daughter
- Parent: Stanislas-Philippe-Henri Doria

Count Armand Doria (1824-1896) was a French aristocrat, art collector and patron. He served as the mayor of Orrouy from 1864 to 1896. He acquired a significant collection of impressionist works, including paintings subsequently exhibited in museums in Europe and the United States.

== Early life ==
Count Armand-François-Paul des Friches Doria was born on April 24, 1824, in Paris, France. His father, Stanislas-Philippe-Henri Doria, was a marquis, which title his elder brother, Arthur, inherited. His paternal family was ennobled in 1539, during the ancien régime.

Count Doria grew up in the family castle in Cayeux-en-Santerre and a hôtel particulier on the rue de la Perle in Le Marais, Paris. He was raised as a Roman Catholic, and confessed to Félix Dupanloup.

== Career ==
Count Doria served as the mayor of Orrouy from 1864 to 1896. During the Franco-Prussian War of 1870, he encouraged local inhabitants to enlist in the French army and protected the town from the Prussian invaders. Count Doria was conservative, and he was influenced by the works of Joseph de Maistre, Louis Gabriel Ambroise de Bonald and Antoine Eugène Genoud.

Count Doria was a patron of the arts and art collector. For example, he was a patron to Adolphe-Félix Cals, who stayed in his castle for an extended period of time. Other long-term guests were Gustave-Henri Colin and Victor Vignon. Count Doria also invited Jean-Baptiste-Camille Corot and Édouard Manet.

Count Doria was the owner of The Roman Campagna, with the Claudian Aqueduct, an 1826 painting by Corot which is now in the permanent collection of the National Gallery in London. Another Corot painting, View of Olevano, is at the Kimbell Art Museum in Fort Worth, Texas. He purchased many more paintings by Corot over the years. He was also the owner of La Leçon de tricot by Jean-François Millet. Another Millet painting he owned, View of Farm Buildings across a Field, is now in the collection of the Ashmolean Museum in Oxford. Additionally, Count Doria owned La maison du pendu by Paul Cézanne, but he exchanged it with art collector Victor Chocquet for another Cézanne painting, La Neige fondante. He also owned Les Grands boulevards by Pierre-Auguste Renoir, which is now in the collection of the Philadelphia Museum of Art.

Count Doria also mentored Léon-Honoré Labande, who served as the archivist of the Prince's Palace of Monaco from 1906 to 1939.

== Personal life ==
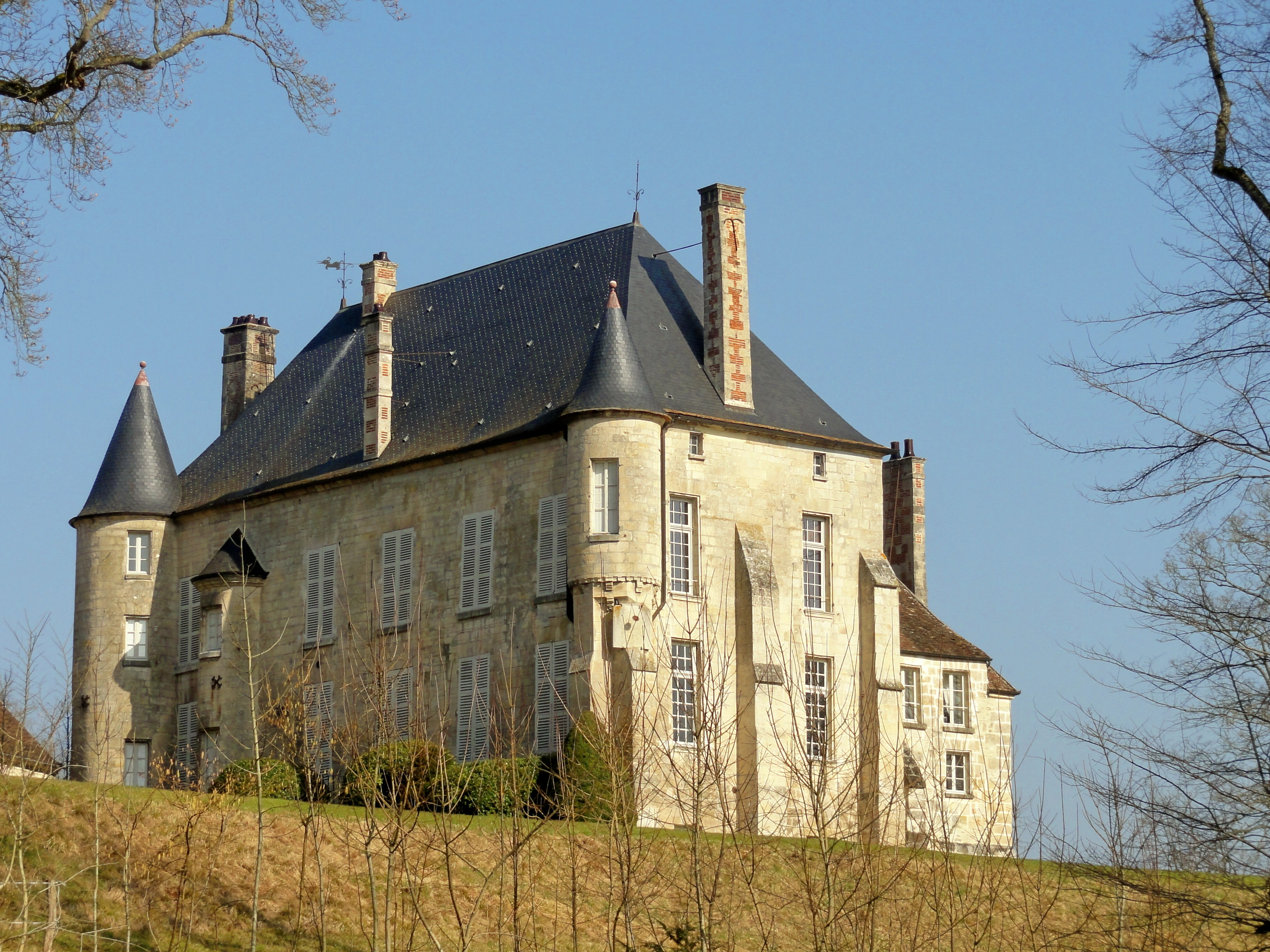
Château d'Orrouy.

Count Doria married Marie-Berthe de Villiers, the daughter of Prudent-Léopold de Villiers and Elizabeth Poulletier de Suzenet, in 1854. They resided at the Château d'Orrouy, owned by his grandparents, in Orrouy, Oise, Picardy. They had a son, François Doria, and a daughter, Marie-Luce. His wife died four years into their marriage. His daughter died when she was twenty years old.

== Death ==
Count Doria died on May 7, 1896. He was buried in Orrouy.
