= Victor Vignon =

French painter

- Born: 25 December 1847; Villers-Cotterêts
- Died: 15 March 1909 (aged 61); Meulan
- Occupations: French Impressionist landscape painter and graphic artist

Victor Alfred Paul Vignon (25 December 1847– 15 March 1909) was a French Impressionist landscape painter and graphic artist. He was involved with the Impressionism movement and its protagonists, as he exhibited at the fifth, sixth, seventh, and eight Paris Impressionist Exhibitions from 1880 to 1886.

== Biography ==
His mother was Marie-Noémi Cadiot, a sculptor who worked under the name "Claude Vignon" (after a character from the novel Béatrix by Balzac). When he was born, she was the proprietor of a hotel which was decorated by Puvis de Chavannes in the 1850s, so he had an early introduction to art. He studied with Camille Corot and Adolphe-Félix Cals. Originally, he worked in the Val-d'Oise, supplemented with trips to Clamart, Bougival, and La Celle-Saint-Cloud.

In the 1870s, he formed a friendship with Camille Pissarro and associated with his circle in Auvers-sur-Oise, including Paul Cézanne and Armand Guillaumin among the others. They frequently painted in each other's company while also sharing similar subjects. During this period his work embraced the brighter color palette and the brushstroke technique of Impressionism, thus leaving behind the style of the Barbizon School which characterized his formation and early production.

In 1878, besides having a large sale of works at Pierre-Firmin Martin, he exhibited for the first time at the Salon, where he showed two paintings. In 1880, he moved to Nesles-la-Vallée then, a short time later, settled in L'Isle-Adam, where he made friends with Vincent van Gogh and Dr. Paul Gachet became one of his best customers. In the same period, art dealer Théo van Gogh, brother of Vincent, also bought some of his works which are nowadays part of the collection at the Van Gogh Museum in Amsterdam.

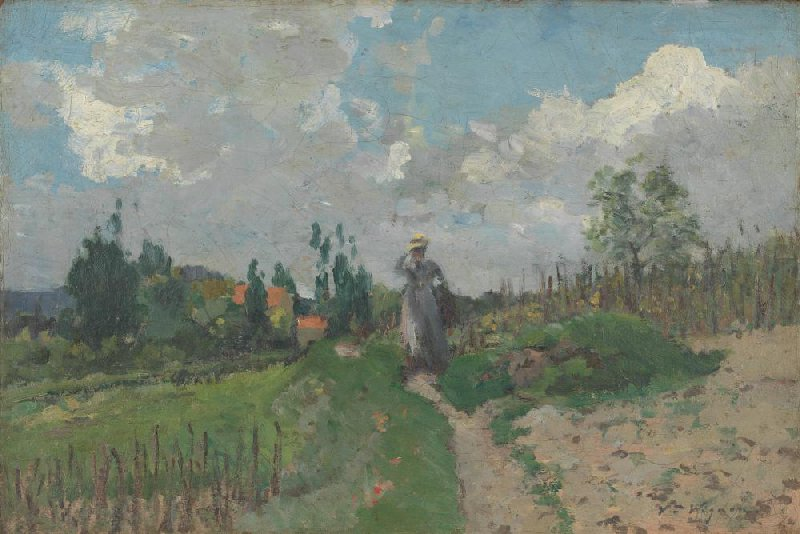
Victor Alfred Paul Vignon, Woman in a Vineyard, c. 1880, Van Gogh Museum

In 1880 and 1881, he participated to the fifth and sixth Paris Impressionist Exhibitions, whose invitation process was mostly managed by Edgar Degas. Despite some initial resistance from Claude Monet, who believed that his sharp outlines were not truly impressionistic, he most notably participated to the seventh Paris Impressionist Exhibition in 1882, which in contrast with the previous one was not managed by Degas, and whose participation was indeed severely restricted to a small circle of only nine "true" Impressionists. The other eight participants were Gustave Caillebotte, Paul Gauguin, Armand Guillaumin, Claude Monet, Berthe Morisot, Camille Pissarro, Pierre-Auguste Renoir, and Alfred Sisley. His participation with 15 paintings to such an exclusive exhibition cements his status in the Impressionism movement, while separating him from the group of participants who took part in the other less restricted exhibitions managed by Degas. Among the various reviews from the exhibition, critic Sallanches noted that the source of inspiration for Vignon is the same as the one of his friend Camille Pissarro, but he assessed Vignon as being less strong in composition while being more brilliant in colours. In 1886, Vignon participated in the 8th and last Impressionist Exhibition. Critic Félix Fénéon, an ardent promoter of the pointillism and the neo-impressionism movement led by Georges Seurat, negatively assessed Vignon's landscape compositions as generally invariable and dull. On the other hand, critics Fevre and Geffroy appreciated Vignon's painting style and the "emotional and sincere" aspect of his landscapes.

In 1894, a large solo exhibition of Vignon was held at the Bernheim-Jeune Gallery in Paris. In the preface of the exhibition catalogue, critic Roger Marx noted some influences from the old Dutch Masters but he significantly diminished the influence of Corot and the Barbizon school, as the extent of these influences constituted a common criticism against Vignon and his impressionistic style. At the end of his review, Roger Marx refers to Vignon as "a link between two schools that have succeeded one another, fought with one another", and also as "a transition between what has been and what will be, from the art of yesterday to the art of tomorrow".

Already afflicted by a heart condition and serious vision problems in the late 1880s, he never really had the chance to evolve into Post-Impressionism, and at the end of the 1890s he started to lose his sight. In 1900, Dr. Georges Viau, an oral surgeon who was an enthusiastic art collector, helped Vignon to get his works displayed at the Exposition Universelle. Three years later, Pierre-Auguste Renoir and Paul Durand-Ruel helped organize a retrospective of his work. After his death, Renoir and Julie Manet-Rouart (the daughter of Berthe Morisot) organized another exhibition. Among the others, other posthumous solo exhibitions took place in 1921 at the Bernheim-Jeune Gallery, 1923 at the Durant-Ruel Gallery in New York, and 1938 at Huinck & Scherjon in Amsterdam.

Very popular with art collectors, his works were and continue nowadays to be part of important private collections. Among the others, auctions held in the 1900s and 1910s, revealed a significant presence of his paintings within the collections of Dr. Georges Viau, F. Stumpf, Count Armand Doria, Louis Flornoy, Georges Feydeau, Albert Bernier, Nicholas Auguste Hazard, as well as art critics Roger Marx and Arsene Alexandre.

== Selected paintings ==
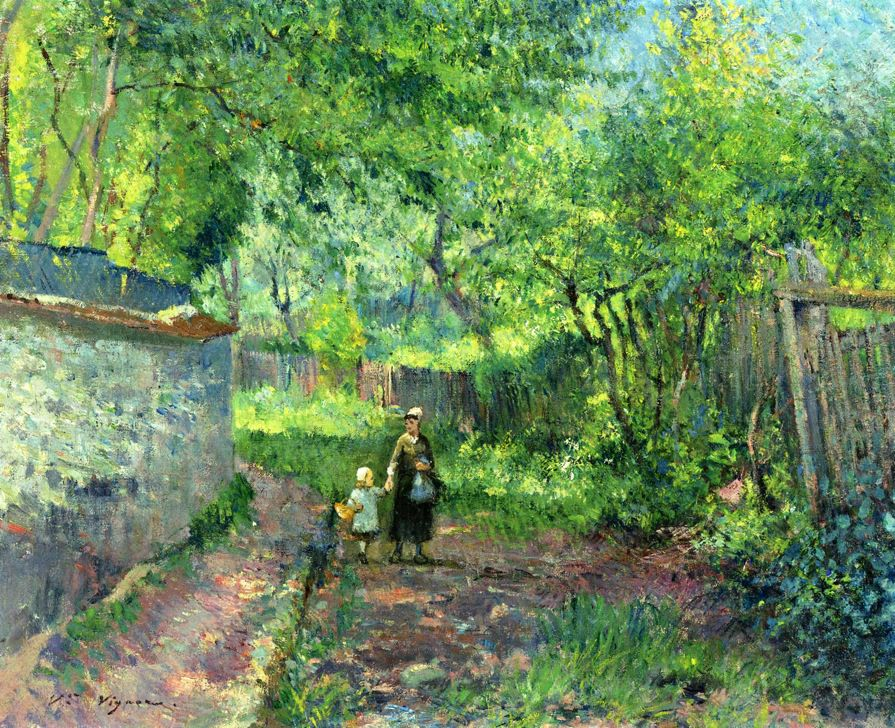
Mother and Child Taking a Walk

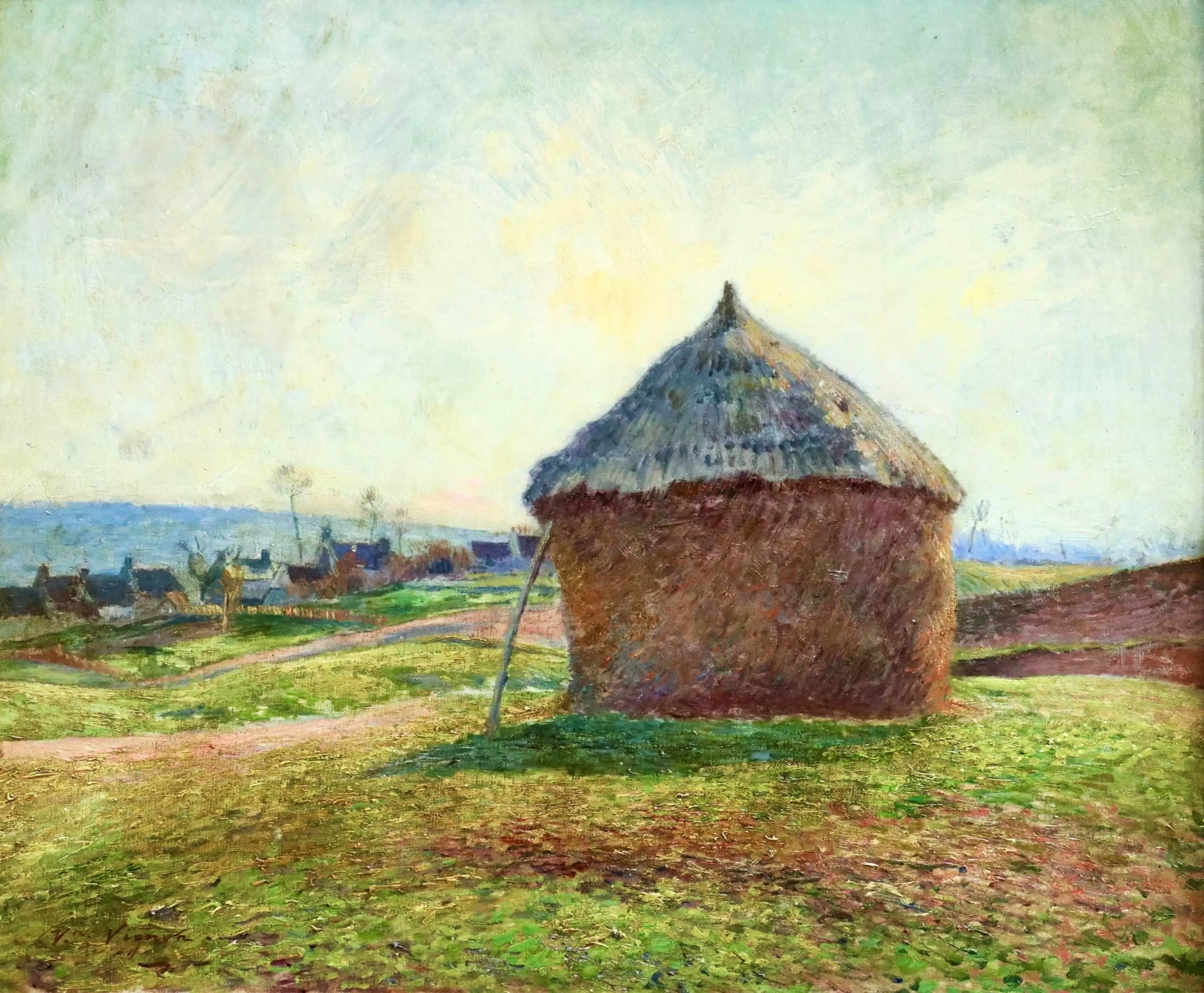
The Haystack

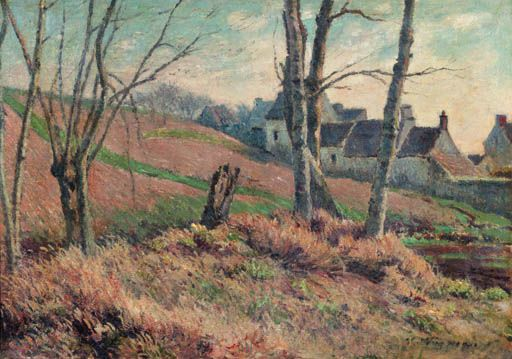
Group of Houses

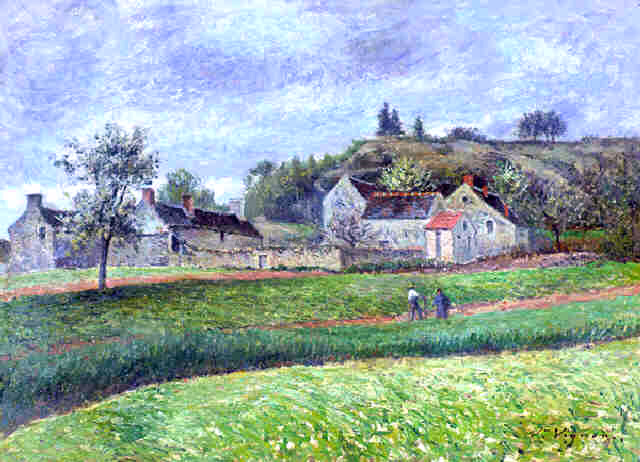
Village in Spring

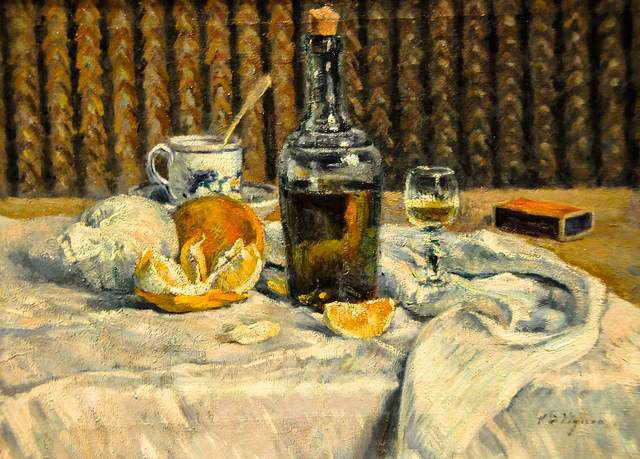
Still-life with Oranges
