= Château d'Orrouy =

Coordinates: 49.2928°N 2.8593°E

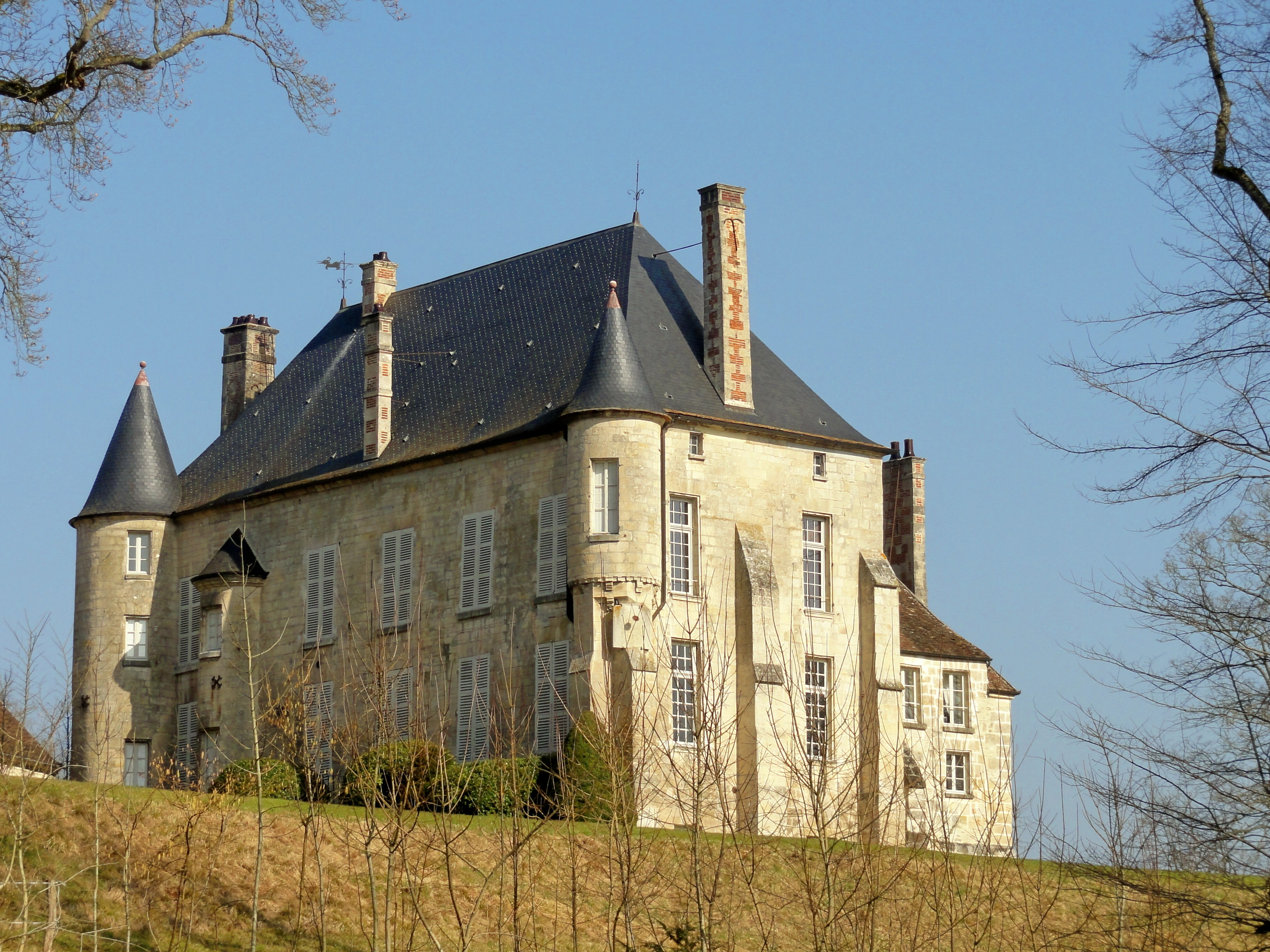
- Interactive map of the Château d'Orrouy area

The Château d'Orrouy is an historic castle in Orrouy, Oise, Hauts-de-France, France.

== History ==
"The castle, originally constructed in the 15th century, underwent a significant redesign during the 19th century, adopting the Gothic Revival architectural style

Initially belonging to the Foucault family, the castle passed through various hands: Joseph-Abraham Deshayes de Cambronne, manager of Louis Philippe II, Duke of Orléans's Appanage, his son Arnouph Deshayes de Cambronne, adjudicator of the National guard of the Château de Compiègne and Aide-de-camp of the king Charles X of France; before being inherited by Count Armand Doria in later years. Doria, an avid art collector, who frequently hosted renowned painters such as Jean-Baptiste-Camille Corot and Édouard Manet for short visits, and Adolphe-Félix Cals and Gustave-Henri Colin as extended guests.

The Château d'Orrouy became the command post of the Champlieu tank camp, led by Jean Baptiste Eugène Estienne, in which General Darius Paul Dassault (Chardasso) participated and whose pilot son, Georges, traced the longest automobile route of the world linking the Mediterranean to Niger, Chad, Congo and whose friend Joseph Kessel begins his novel Les Nuits de Sibérie with: “My friend, the pilot Estienne…”.

== Architectural significance ==
It has been listed as an official historical monument since March 30, 1989.
