= Onorato Caetani (died 1400) =

Italian nobleman

Onorato I Caetani (c. 1336 – 20 April 1400) was an Italian nobleman, who was the count of Fondi from 1348 and the Great Constable of the Kingdom of Naples also from 1348. He was also lord of Sermoneta, Bassiano, Marino and also Senator of Rome from 1384.

== Biography ==
He was born at Fondi, the son of Nicola I Caetani, lord of Sermoneta and Bassiano, and Giacoma Orsini, the daughter of Rinaldo and Giacomo Orsini of Marino. Around 1348, at Nicola's death, he inherited the county of Fondi, which was confirmed him by queen Joanna I of Naples in 1352. He thenceforth started to expand his lands in the northern Kingdom of Naples and southern Papal States (what is now southern Lazio). In 1356, he subdued Anagni and Sezze. His power was also based on familiar ties, both with other members of his family and their feudataries, and with powerful figures such as Francesco Del Balzo Orsini, whose sister he had married. A sister of Onorato married to Stefanello Colonna.

In 1367, Pope Urban V excommunicated Caetani, who was besieging Ferentino and was forced to retreat by a papal army. He later reconciled with the papacy and was named rector of Campagna e Marittima. He was among the noblemen who accompanied the return of Pope Gregory XI to Rome in 1377. The Pope, after his stay there was stopped due to a revolt, took refuge at Caetani's court in Anagni. However, the new Pope, Urban VI, deprived him of Campagna and Marittima in 1378: in exchange, Caetani housed at Fondi the cardinals who elected a rival Pope, Clement VII, who established his residence there. On 22 November 1378, Clement restored him as rector of Campagna and Marittima, and also granted him the fiefs of Sermoneta and Bassiano. In the winter of 1379, Caetani took part in the military operations of Clement's followers to capture Rome; despite their defeat, Clement awarded him 2,000 florins for his help and, after the move of his court to Avignon, used Caetani's lands near Fondi as their logistic base in Italy.

This period was Caetani's apex: he defeated his rivals at Ninfa, built a fortress at Castellonorato (in the modern comune of Formia, 1380), reclaimed several areas of southern Lazio and distributed lands to his peasants. His power, however, started to decay after Charles of Durazzo's invasion of southern Italy in 1381. Charles, after capturing Naples, executed Baldassarre of Brunswick, Caetani's brother-in-law and his main link with the Neapolitan court, and hired Onorato's brother Giacomo to conquer Fondi. Velletri expelled his Breton mercenaries and also Anagni revolted against him. Caetani however was able to resist, and was one of the supporters of Louis I of Anjou in his attempt to capture the Kingdom of Naples. During the war between the former's successor, Louis II of Anjou and Ladislaus of Durazzo, Caetani did not change sides, and remained an ally of Clement VII and his Avignonese successor, Benedict XIII. This led pope Boniface IX to excommunicate him again (3 May 1399), and a crusade was launched against Fondi. King Ladislaus attacked his lands from the south while papal troops came from the north. After losing Anagni, Sezze and Cisterna, he launched a desperate assault on Rome (15 January 1400), but was defeated at Porta del Popolo.

Onorato Caetani decided to submit to Boniface IX, but died soon afterwards of apoplexy.

== Sources ==
- Edmond-René Labande, CAETANI, Onorato, Dizionario Biografico degli Italiani - Enciclopedia Italiana - Volume 16 (1973)
