= George Viau =

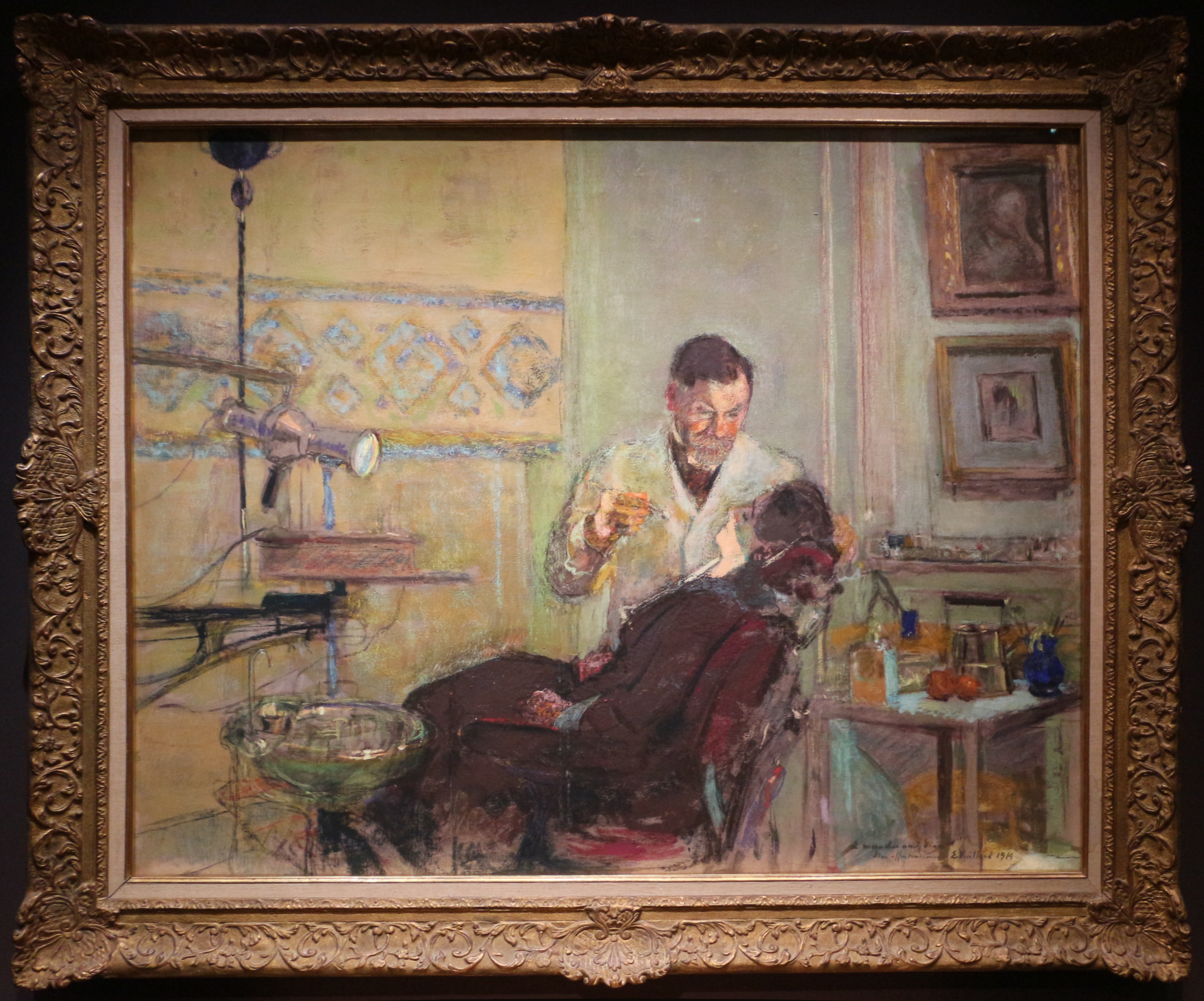
- Édouard Vuillard, Le Docteur Georges Viau dans son cabinet dentaire (1914, "Doctor Georges Viau in his dental office")
- Born: March 28, 1855; Nancy, France
- Died: December 18, 1939 (aged 84); Paris
- Occupation: Dentist
- Known for: Art collecting

George Viau (28 March 1855 – 18 December 1939) was a French dentist and art collector. His collection, which was built up and sold off more than once, included work by many impressionist painters and the artists who influenced them. Viau's dental practice was at number 47 Boulevard Haussmann, where one of his patients was Claude Monet.

The collection sold in 1907 included works by, among others, Boudin, Carrière, Cassatt, Cézanne, Dagnan-Bouveret, Daumier, Degas, Delacroix, Gauguin, Guillaumin, Jongkind, Lebourg, Lépine, Manet, Monet, Morisot, Pissarro, Renoir, Sisley, and Vignon.

A collection of more than 200 paintings owned by Viau went to Wilhelm Hansen, whose collection formed the basis of the Ordrupgaard museum. After Viau's death, the Hôtel Drouot auctioned paintings from his estate. One Cézanne in that collection sold for over 5 million francs, and the auction brought in 53 million francs in all.

A portrait of Viau painted by Édouard Vuillard in 1914 is held at the Musée d'Orsay.
