= Arnouph Deshayes de Cambronne =

French noble

Arnouph Louis Joseph Deshayes de Cambronne (born March 26, 1768 in Crépy-en-Valois, Oise, d. 1846) was the major adjudant of the National Guard (France) at the Château de Compiègne.

== Early life ==
Arnouph Louis Joseph Deshayes de Cambronne—also recorded as Arnould or Arnoult—was born on March 26, 1768, in Crépy-en-Valois (Oise), and baptized the same year at the church of Saint-Denis in Crépy. His paternal lineage includes his grandfather Alexandre Deshayes, from Wiège-Faty, and his father, Joseph-Abraham Deshayes (1728, Guise – 1795, Orrouy), both serving as directors of insinuations for the Apanage of Louis Philippe I, Duke of Orléans and Louis Philippe II, Duke of Orléans. His mother was Cécile-Louise-Marguerite Doyen (1738–1815).

On January 20, 1806, he married Rosalie-Zélie de Hémant (1781–), daughter of a master of the Cour des comptes and Anne-Victoire-Mélanie Rolland (1814-) in 1842, at the church Notre-Dame-de-Grace de Passy. He was the younger brother of Nicolas Alexandre Joseph Deshayes de Merville (1760–1816) who married Bonne Victoire Randon (1767–1824) in 1788. He is the ancestor of Claude and Laurence de Cambronne.

== Career ==
He fought in 1792 next to baron Charles-Louis-David Le Peletier, comte d'Aunay during the battle of Louis Joseph, Prince of Condé. They fought in the Company of Count du Comte de Laurétan to reach the Siege of Maastricht by the French revolutionary army directed by Francisco de Miranda, under the orders of Jean Thérèse de Beaumont d'Autichamp.

In December 1793 (17 Frimaire, Year II), his mother Cécile Doyen was part of a convoy destined for the Château de Chantilly, repurposed as a prison during the Reign of Terror.

In 1794, Deshayes joined the émigré unit known as the Hompesch Hussars, reportedly under the influence of the Beaurepaire de Louvagny family, though the regiment was officially created by Baron Hompesch and operated under British command. The unit was later stationed in Hanover in 1795. He subsequently entered the service of Austrian commander Franz-Simon Pfaff von Pfaffenhofen, Tyrol, who appointed him officer.

During the Bourbon Restoration, from February 15, 1815 to 1826, he served as major adjutant of the National Guard stationed at the Château de Compiègne supporting the ultraroyalist cause. His appointment was aligned with the political leadership of Mathieu de Montmorency, Foreign minister (1821–1822) in the government of Joseph de Villèle and Durand Borel de Brétizel, overseen by the Count of Eugène François Léon de Béthune d'Hesdigneul and of Antoine Charles Louis de Lasalle, with royal assent.

In August 1822, he was promoted to colonel by Louis XVIII and made a Knight of the Order of Saint Louis. Around this time, he adopted the name "Deshayes de Cambronne"—possibly inspired by the growing public attention surrounding General Pierre Cambronne, who had been ennobled two years earlier. Cambronne had recently become a symbolic figure in royalist and Bonapartist circles, partly due to the famous (though likely apocryphal) phrase attributed to him at Waterloo, later popularized by journalist Michel-Nicolas Balisson de Rougemont and quoted by Victor Hugo in Les Misérables.

He resided in the Château de la Mothe (Béthisy-Saint-Martin) and the Château d'Orrouy, within the estate of Champlieu and served Charles de Maillé de La Tour-Landry (in French). He also acted as Aide-de-camp to the Comte d'Artois (future king Charles X), who was then General Colonel of the Garde Nationale. He was relieved of his duties in 1827. Contemporary accounts note his striking physical resemblance to the Comte d’Artois.

Deshayes died in 1846. That same year, the Gallo-Roman ruins of Champlieu (in French) —located on the territory of Orrouy—were being rediscovered and would later be classified as historic monuments (in 1886). The site is now managed by the General Council of Oise and crossed by one of the ancient Brunehaut roads (in French).

== Family gallery ==
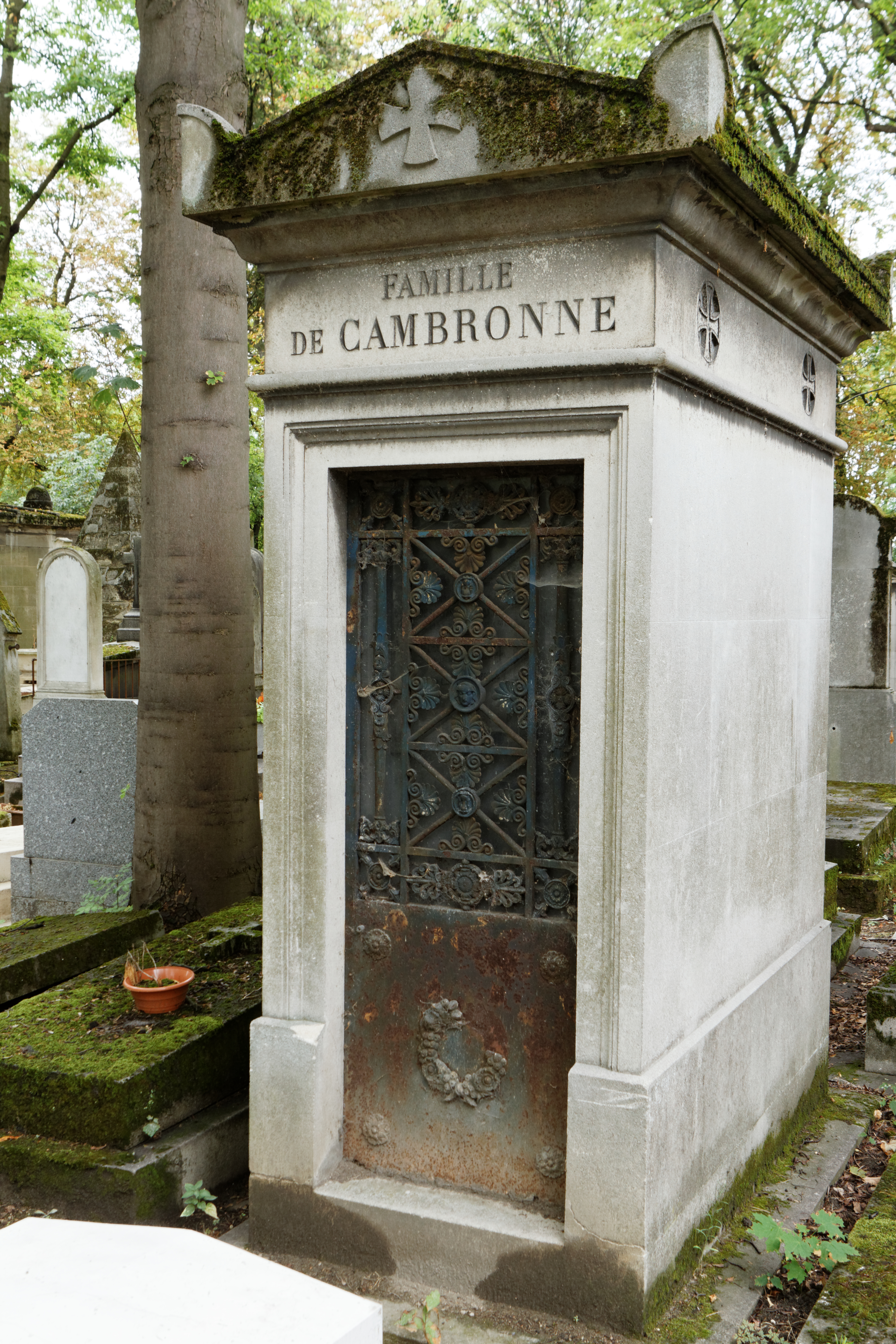

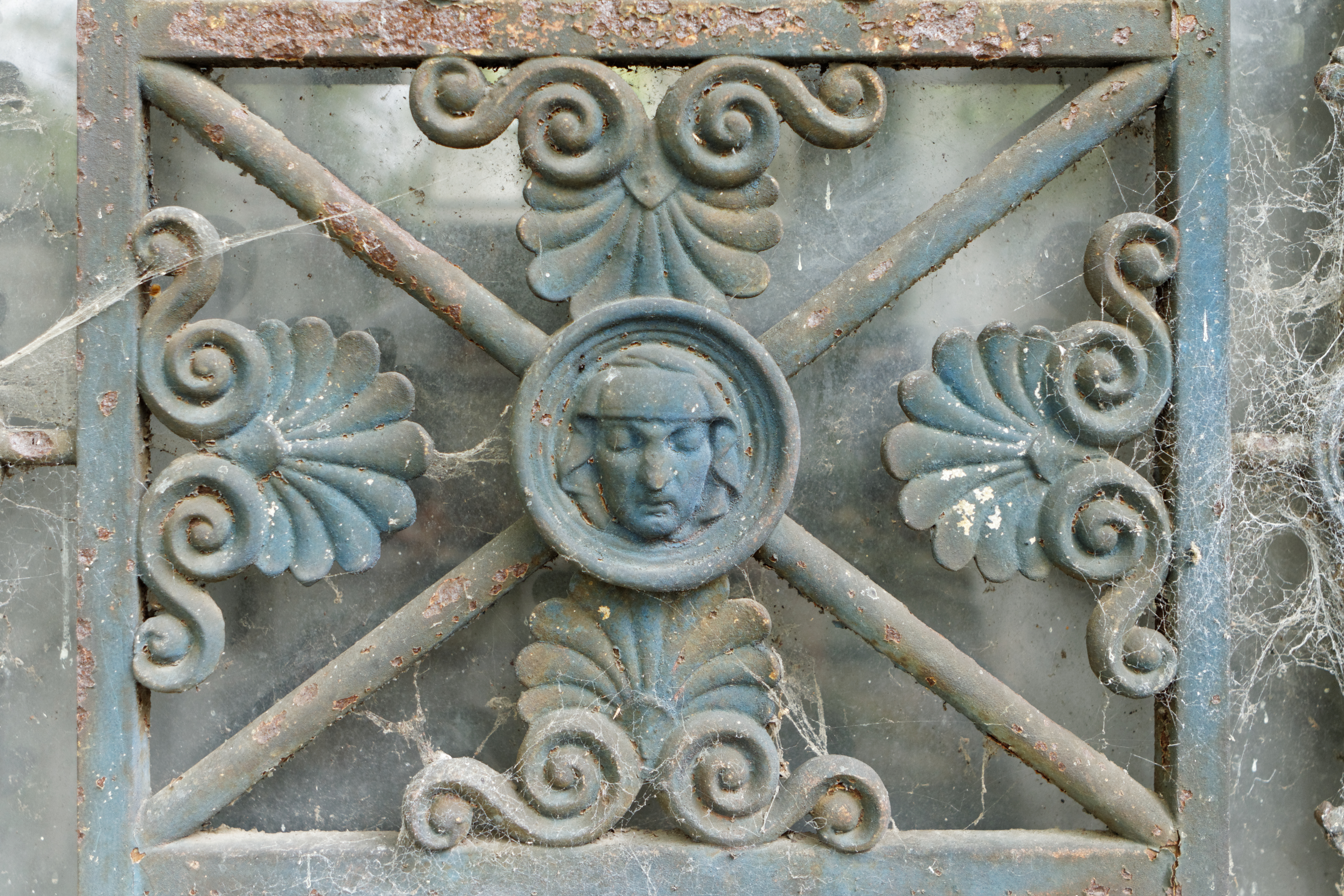

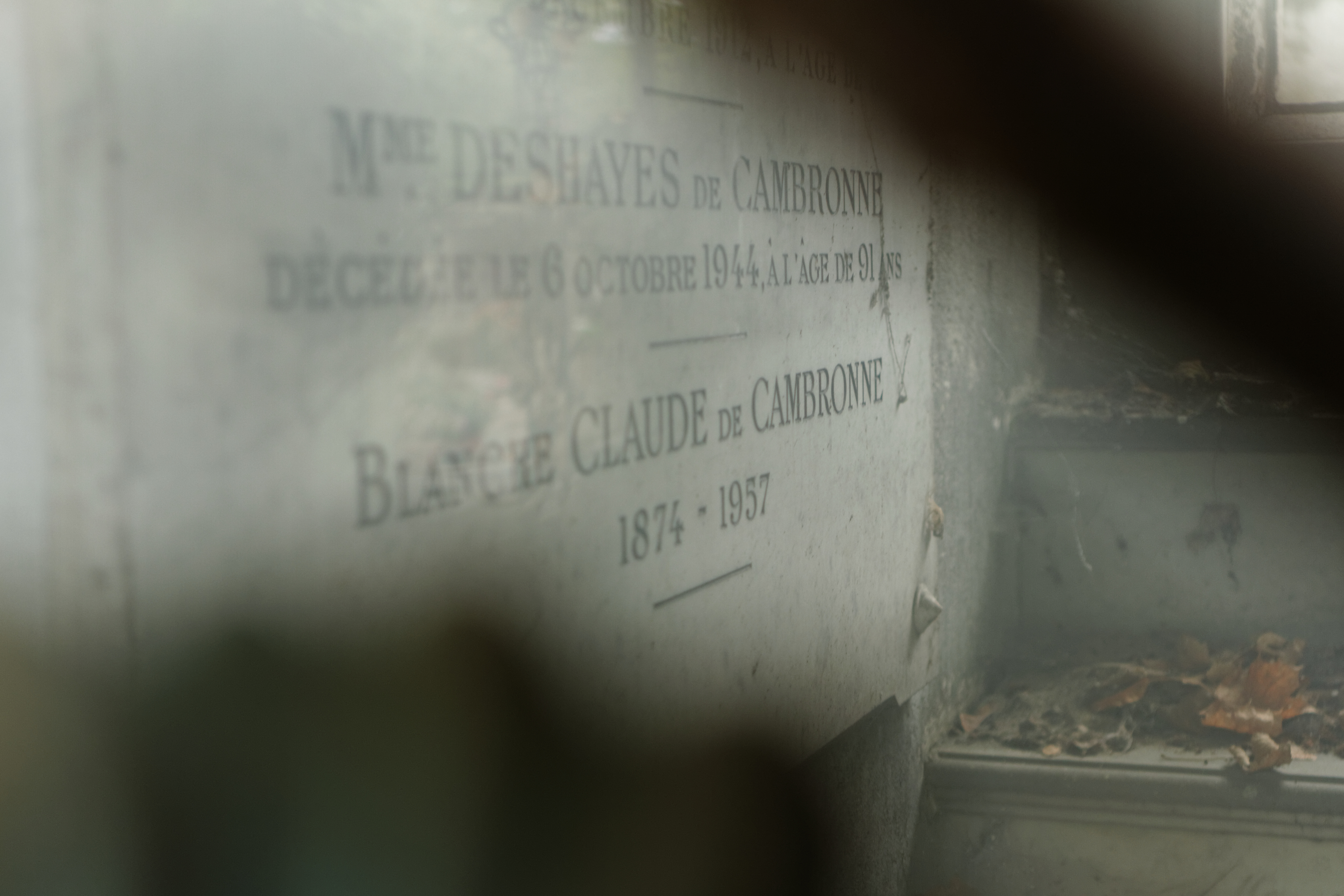

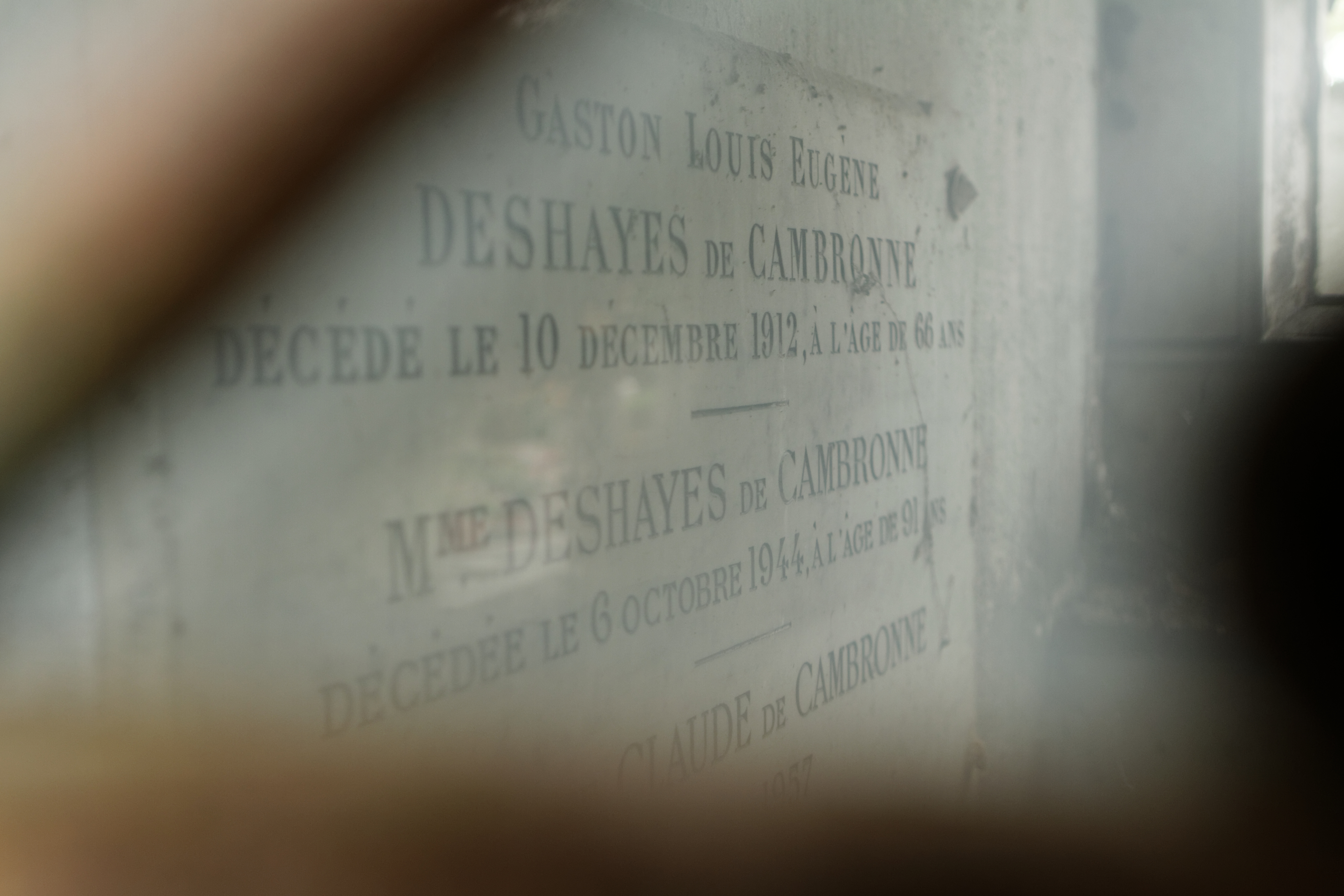

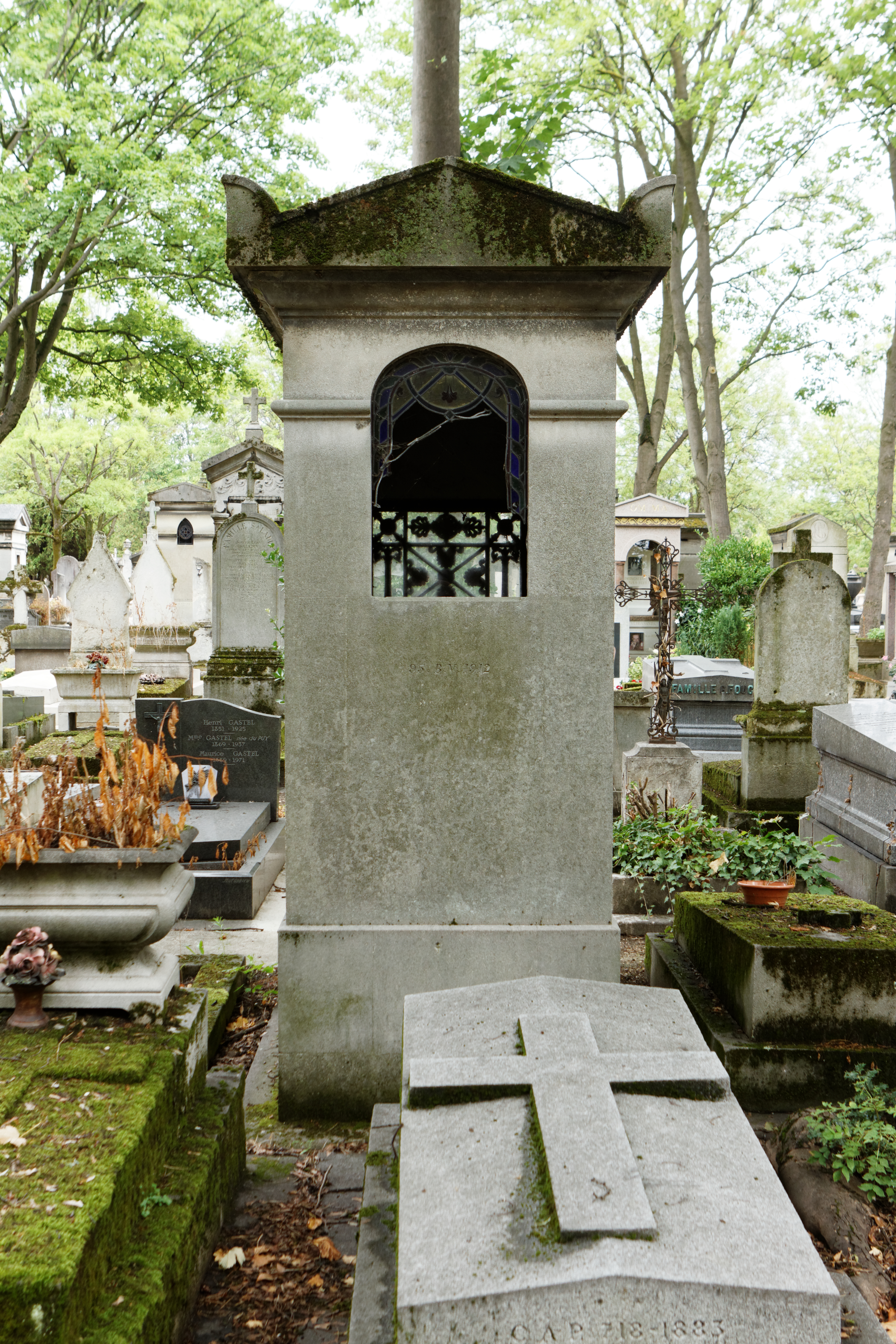

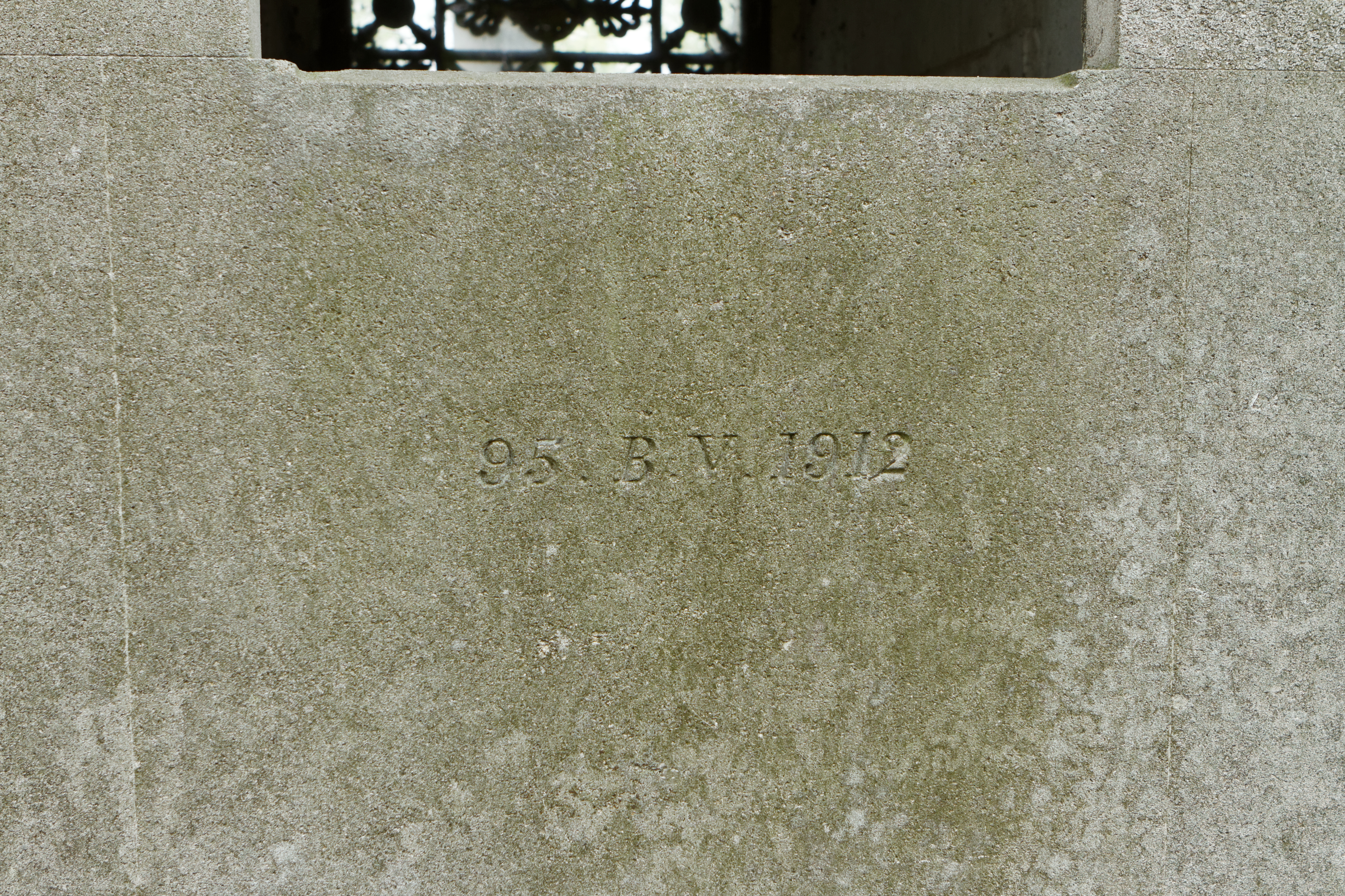

== Awards ==
- Chevalier de l'ordre royal de la Légion d'honneur in 1822

== Bibliography ==
- Non-inline source, L'Intermédiaire des chercheurs et curieux

== Sources ==
- Biography and original documents of Arnouph Deshayes de Cambronne in the Archives of the Légion d'honneur, Base Leonore, National archives, Ministry of Culture
