= Gustave-Henri Colin =

French painter (1828–1910)

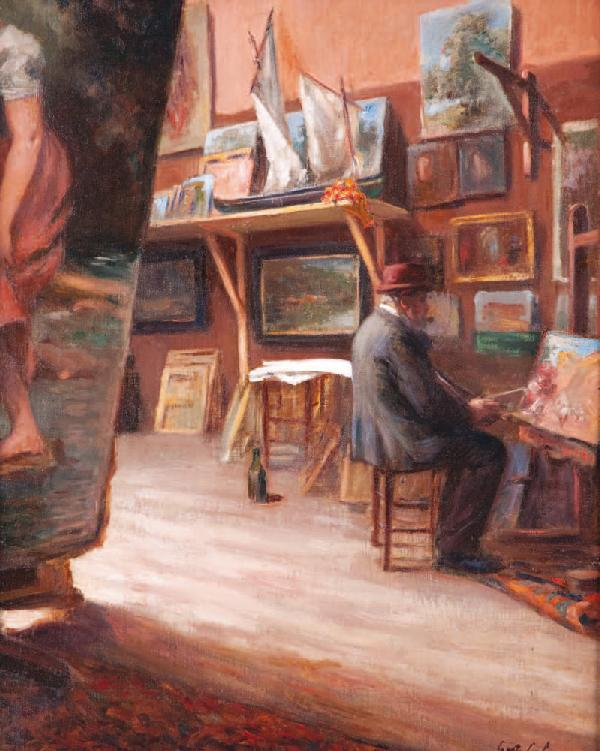
- Gustave Colin, the painter in his workshop
- Born: July 11, 1828; Arras, Pas-de-Calais, Nord-Pas-de-Calais, France
- Died: December 28, 1910 (aged 82); Paris, France
- Occupation: Painter

Gustave-Henri Colin (1828–1910) was a French painter.

== Early life ==
Gustave-Henri Colin was born on July 11, 1828, in Arras, France. He learned painting from Constant Dutilleux in Arras. Upon moving to Paris, he took lessons from Ary Scheffer and Thomas Couture.

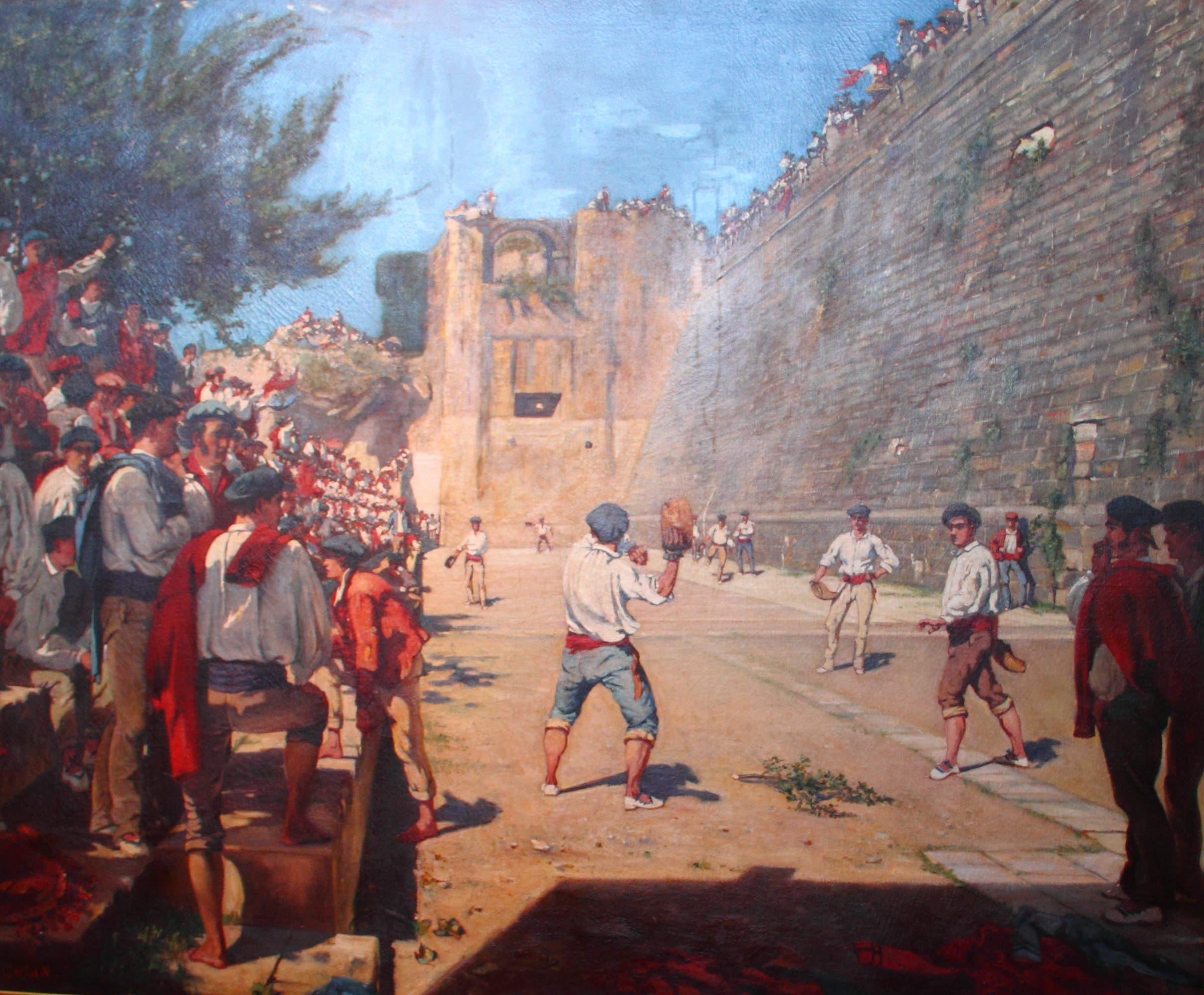
Partie de pelote sous les remparts de Fontarabie (Hondarribia), 1863.

== Career ==
Colin was a painter. He painted landscapes and portraits. He exhibited his first painting, Portrait of a Grandmother, at the Salon in Paris in 1857. A year later, in 1858, he established a studio in Ciboure near Biarritz. By 1863, he exhibited his work at the Salon des Refusés in Paris.

Colin spent time at the Château d'Orrouy, a castle owned by Count Armand Doria, an aristocrat and art collector. He met James McNeill Whistler in Saint-Jean-de-Luz in 1862.

== Personal life ==
Colin was married to a Basque.

== Death ==
Colin died on December 28, 1910, in Paris, France.
