= Labandeira =

Labandeira is a Portuguese surname, it means Wagtail. Notable people with the surname include:

- Facundo Labandeira (born 1996), Uruguayan footballer
- Josh Labandeira (born 1979), American baseball player
- Julio Labandeira (born 1949), Argentine sailor

== See also ==
- Labande
