= Château de la Mothe (Béthisy-Saint-Martin) =

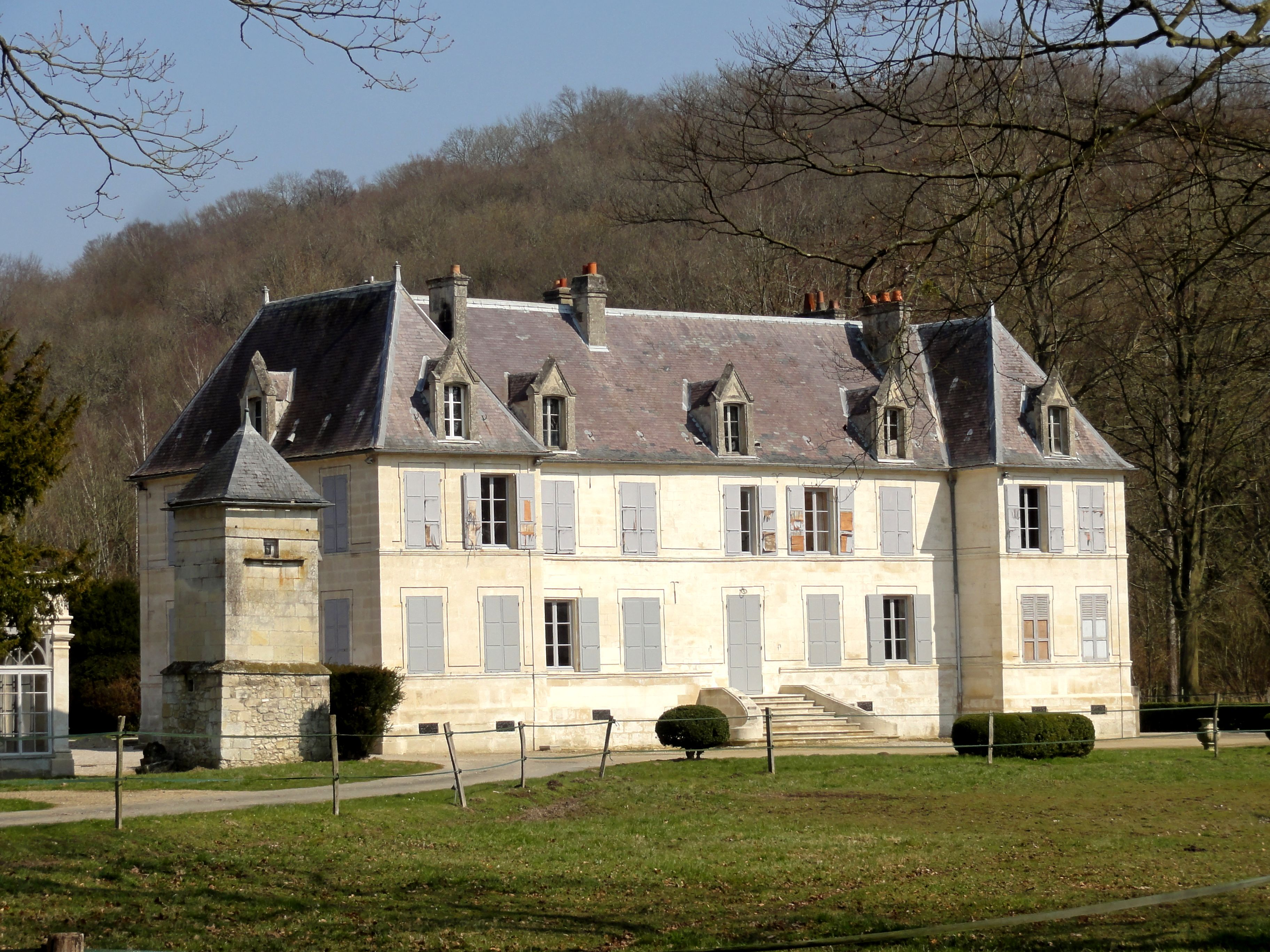
- Château de la Mothe, Crépy Street / RD 123, isolated location
- Interactive map of Château de la Mothe

The Château de la Mothe is a 17th-century estate, remodeled in the 19th and 20th centuries, located in Béthisy-Saint-Martin (France).

== Location ==
The castle is located in the commune of Béthisy-Saint-Martin, in the Oise department, in Picardy. It is situated between Béthisy-Saint-Martin and Orrouy, south of the Compiègne Forest.

== History ==
The Château de La Motte was built in the 17th century on the ruins of the Château de Donneval, one of the oldest fiefs of Valois. This territory includes four nearby sites: La Motte, Donneval, Champlieu, and Orrouy, all linked since the feudal era.

Since antiquity, Champlieu and Donneval were occupied by the Romans. The fortified fief of Donneval passed through the hands of various noble families, including the Foucaults, lords of several estates, until their extinction around 1673.

On May 18, 1683, the lands were acquired by Jérôme Herlaut de La Motte, a high royal official exempt from taxes as a squire. His son-in-law, Louis Mottet de La Motte (1651–1733), baron, completed the castle construction between 1650 and 1710. The Mottet family kept ownership until the 18th century, notably Nicolas Mottet, then Antoine-Nicolas Rémond, a lawyer at the Parliament, heir through his mother Anne Mottet.

In 1725, Jérôme II Herlaut was condemned to pay franc-fief duties on inherited noble lands despite his father's privileges.

In the 19th century, the castle was renovated (around 1816) and became the property of Edmond de Seroux, who installed Gallo-Roman remains discovered at Champlieu. Before him, the estate belonged to Arnouph Deshayes de Cambronne, a royal military officer.

From May 20 to June 23, 1916, the command of the 7th Infantry Division was headquartered at Château de la Mothe.

== Grounds ==
The estate includes a classical-style castle, a park, a mill on the Automne River, outbuildings, an orangery, and a dovecote. The site remains appreciated for its romantic setting.

== Heritage protection ==
It was listed as a historic monument in 1986.
