= Saint-Siméon, Eure =

Saint-Siméon
- Commune
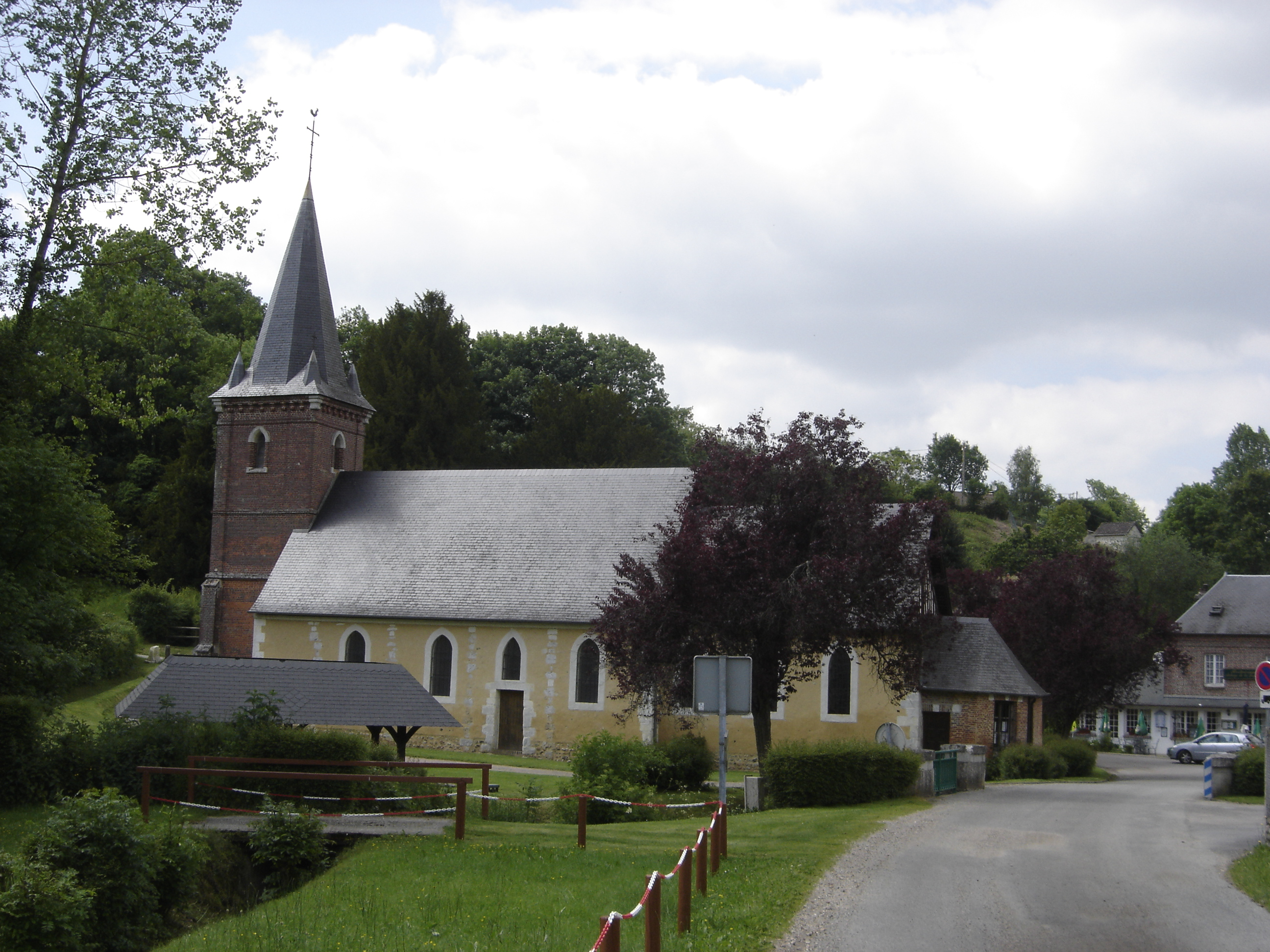
- The church in Saint-Siméon
- Location of Saint-Siméon
- Location within France Location within Normandy
- Coordinates: 49°17′09″N 0°31′15″E
- Country: France
- Region: Normandy
- Department: Eure
- Arrondissement: Bernay
- Canton: Beuzeville

Government
  - Mayor (2020–2026): Régis Peuffier
- Area^{1}: 7.49 km^{2} (2.89 sq mi)
- Elevation: 132 m (433 ft)
- Highest elevation: 164 m (538 ft)
- Lowest elevation: 70 m (230 ft)
- Population (2023): 333
  - Density: 44.5/km^{2} (115/sq mi)
- Time zone: UTC+01:00 (CET)
  - Summer (DST): UTC+02:00 (CEST)
- INSEE/Postal code: 27603 /27560
- ^{1} French Land Register data, which excludes lakes, ponds, glaciers > 1 km^{2} (0.386 sq mi or 247 acres) and river estuaries.

Saint-Siméon (French pronunciation: [sɛ̃ simeɔ̃]) is a commune in the Eure department in Normandy in northern France.

== Geography ==
The commune along with another 69 communes shares part of a 4,747 hectare, Natura 2000 conservation area, called Risle, Guiel, Charentonne.

== Population ==
Historical population
Year	Pop.	±% p.a.
1968	239	—
1975	213	−1.63%
1982	236	+1.48%
1990	282	+2.25%
1999	278	−0.16%
2007	308	+1.29%
2012	322	+0.89%
2017	317	−0.31%
2023	333	+0.82%
Source: INSEE

== See also ==
- Communes of the Eure department
