= Léon-Honoré Labande =

- Born: 17 September 1867; Orrouy, Oise, France
- Died: 21 September 1939 (aged 72); Villeneuve-lès-Avignon, Gard, France
- Education: Saint-Lucien Seminary
- Alma mater: École Nationale des Chartes
- Occupations: Museum curator, historian, archivist
- Children: 2 daughters
- Relatives: Edmond-René Labande (nephew)

Léon-Honoré Labande (1867-1939) was a French museum curator, historian and archivist. He was the curator of the Calvet Museum in Avignon from 1890 to 1906. He was the archivist of the Prince's Palace of Monaco from 1906 to 1939. He was the author of many books about prominent families from Provence, the city of Avignon, and the principality of Monaco.

== Early life ==
Léon-Honoré Labande was born on 17 September 1867 in Orrouy, France. His father was a schoolteacher. He was mentored from an early age by Count Armand Doria, an aristocrat and art collector.

Labande was educated at the Saint-Lucien Seminary in Beauvais. He graduated from the École Nationale des Chartes in 1890.

== Career ==
Labande was an archivist in Cheltenham, England, and in Verdun, France. He was the curator of the Avignon Library and the Calvet Museum in Avignon from 1890 to 1906. He was elected as the secretary of the Académie de Vaucluse in 1892. He was the president of the Société vauclusienne des amis des arts.

Labande was appointed as the archivist of the Prince's Palace of Monaco on 1 April 1906, replacing Gustave Saige. He served as archivist for the next three decades. He assisted Louis II, Prince of Monaco in refurbishing the palace, retrieving old paintings, carpets and faience acquired by Honoré II, Prince of Monaco and lost during the French Revolution and First French Empire. Moreover, following the prince's wishes to turn Monaco into a cultural center, he organised conferences about the arts annually. Meanwhile, Labande was appointed as the director of the Museum of Prehistoric Anthropology. Additionally, he served as a member and subsequently president of the Council of State.

Labande authored many books about prominent families from Provence, the city of Avignon, and the principality of Monaco. He served on the editorial board of the Revue d'histoire de l'Église de France.

Labande was appointed as a member of the Académie des Inscriptions et Belles-Lettres in 1927, replacing Henry Cochin. He was Grand Officer of the Order of Saint-Charles and Knight of the Legion of Honour. He was also a recipient of the Order of Vasa from Sweden.

== Personal life ==
Labande was married with two daughters.

== Death ==
Labande died on 21 September 1939 in Villeneuve-lès-Avignon.

== Bibliography ==
- Les Doria de France : Provence, Avignon et Comté Venaissin, Bretagne, Ile-de-France (1899).
- Étude historique et archéologique sur St. Trophime d'Arles du ive au xiiie siècle (1904).
- La Cathédrale de Vaison : étude historique et archéologique (1905).
- Avignon au xiiie siècle (Paris, 1908).
- Le Palais des papes d’Avignon et les monuments historiques d’Avignon au xive siècle (1925).
- Notice sur la vie et les travaux de Henry Cochin, membre de l'Académie (1928).
- Les Primitifs français; Peintres et peintres-verriers de la Provence occidentale (Marseille: Librairie Tacussel, 1932).
- Histoire de la Principauté de Monaco (1934).
- Les Bréa, peintres niçois des xve et xvie siècles en Provence et en Ligurie (Nice: Éditions des Amis du Musée Masséna, 1937).
