= Adolphe-Félix Cals =

French painter (1810–1880)

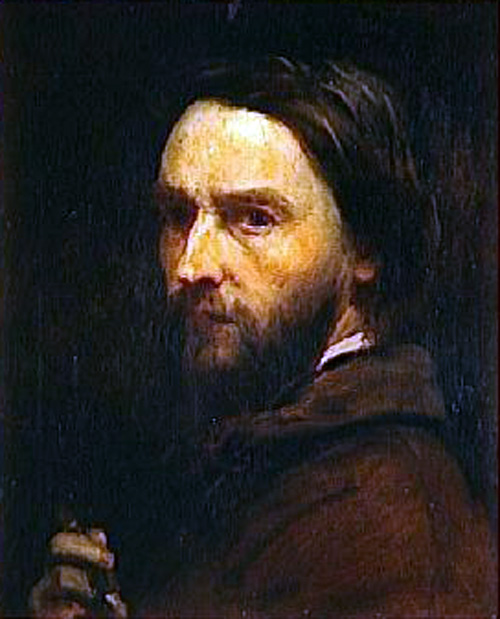
- self-portrait (1851)
- Born: 17 October 1810
- Died: 3 October 1880 (aged 69); Honfleur, France

Adolphe-Félix Cals (17 October 1810 – 3 October 1880) was a French portrait, genre, and landscape painter.

== Life and work ==
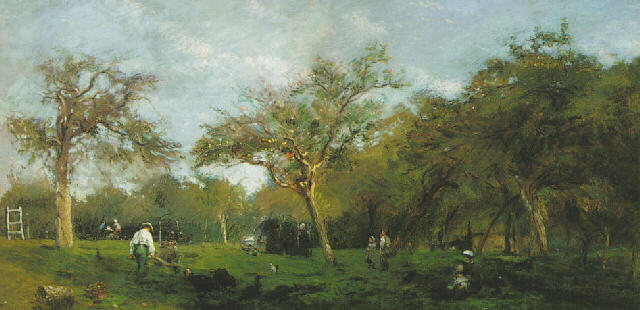
A sunday in Saint-Siméon, 1876.

Adolphe–Félix Cals was born into a poor family, yet his parents attempted to prevent him from performing manual labor. He initially trained as an engraver under Jean-Louis Anselin, who was a family friend. After Anselin died suddenly he went on studying engraving, first with Ponce, then under Bosc, before finally entering the atelier of Léon Cogniet. Cogniet tried to mentor Cals in the direction of a more 'popular' style, although Cals disagreed. Cogniet argued that Cal's style would hurt his career, but Cals refused to give in. He parted company with his (neoclassical-influenced) teacher, owing to his teacher's lack of appreciation for the emerging impressionist movement in art.

His career did in fact suffer, and it was not until he was much older that he reached any level of success. He became critically acclaimed at the 1846 Salon, despite receiving no formal award. His most productive years ended up being the last ten years of his life. He exhibited multiple pieces at the 1868, 1869, and 1870 Salons. In 1863, Cals exhibited at the "Salon des Refusés," alongside works by Monet, Degas, and Pissarro. Art dealer Pierre–Firmin Martin, known as "Father Martin," liked his work, and Cals went on to paint portraits of Martin and his wife (now in the "Musée Eugène Boudin" in Honfleur). So began the next phase of his career; influenced by Jean-Baptiste-Camille Corot and Johan Barthold Jongkind, he worked in more subdued, less fawn-colored tones, more closely matching the Impressionists without adopting the "purple-violet which some painters are flooding their paintings with"—as Victor Jannesson remarked in his book on Cals (see bibliography).

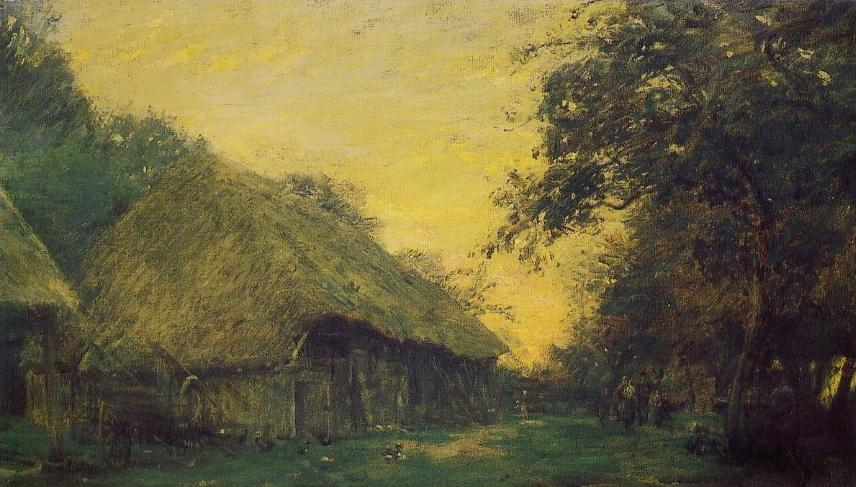
Sundown at Honfleur (1875)

Having divided his time between Paris and Honfleur since 1871, he finally decided to settle down, in 1873, in Honfleur, a port in Normandy that was home to many painters, and has been called "the cradle of impressionism". A friend of Jongkind, Cals regularly visited an inn in Honfleur called the Saint-Siméon Farm, a famous meeting place for artists and writers, such as Claude Monet, Eugène Boudin, and Baudelaire, as well as Jongkind himself.

Having settled, with his daughter, in Honfleur during the last decade of his life, Cals painted the harbor, the sea, and its associated human life. At the invitation of Monet, he participated in the First Impressionist Exhibition in 1874 and 1876, until 1881.

Cals died in Honfleur on October 3, 1880, aged 69.
