= Edmond-René Labande =

French archivist and historian (1908–1992)

- Born: June 11, 1908
- Died: July 22, 1992 (aged 84)
- Education: University of Paris; École pratique des hautes études École Nationale des Chartes
- Occupations: Archivist, historian
- Spouse: Yvonne Mailfert
- Relatives: Léon-Honoré Labande (paternal uncle)

Edmond-René Labande (1908-1992) was a French archivist and historian.

== Early life ==
Edmond-René Labande was born in Paris on June 11, 1908. He was orphaned at the age of ten and raised by his maternal grandfather, Alfred Jeanroy. His paternal uncle, Léon-Honoré Labande, was a museum curator and archivist of the Prince's Palace of Monaco.

Labande graduated from the University of Paris in 1928. He also graduated from the École pratique des hautes études and the École Nationale des Chartes.

== Career ==
Labande started his career as an archivist in Rome, Algiers, Florence, Toulon, and La Flèche.

Labande started teaching medieval history at the University of Poitiers in 1947. Two years later, in 1949, he was promoted to professor. He was a co-founder of the Cahiers de civilisation médiévale, an academic journal.

Labande was the first scholar to offer a skeptical interpretation of Eleanor of Aquitaine, debunking the myth of her persona and researching primary sources about her life.

== Personal life ==
Labande married Yvonne Mailfert in 1932. Labande joined the Third Order of Saint Francis in 1942.

== Death ==
Labande died in Poitiers on July 22, 1992.

== Bibliography ==
- Rinaldo Orsini, comte de Tagliacozzo, et les premières guerres suscitées en Italie centrale par le grand schisme (Imprimerie de Monaco, 1939).
- Étude sur 'Baudouin de Sebourc', chanson de geste (Droz, 1940).
- Sainte Catherine de Sienne et le duc d’Anjou (Annales de l’Université de Poitiers, 1949).
- Florence (Arthaud, Collection 'Les beaux pays', 1950).
- Rome (Arthaud, Collection 'Les beaux pays', 1950).
- L'Italie de la Renaissance: Duecento - Trecento - Quattrocento: Évolution d'une société (Payot, 1954).
- Clément V et le Poitou (Extrait du 'Bulletin de la Société des Antiquaires de l'Ouest', Poitiers, 1957).
