= Pays des Impressionnistes =

Cultural heritage certification mark in France

- Logo of the Pays des Impressionnistes

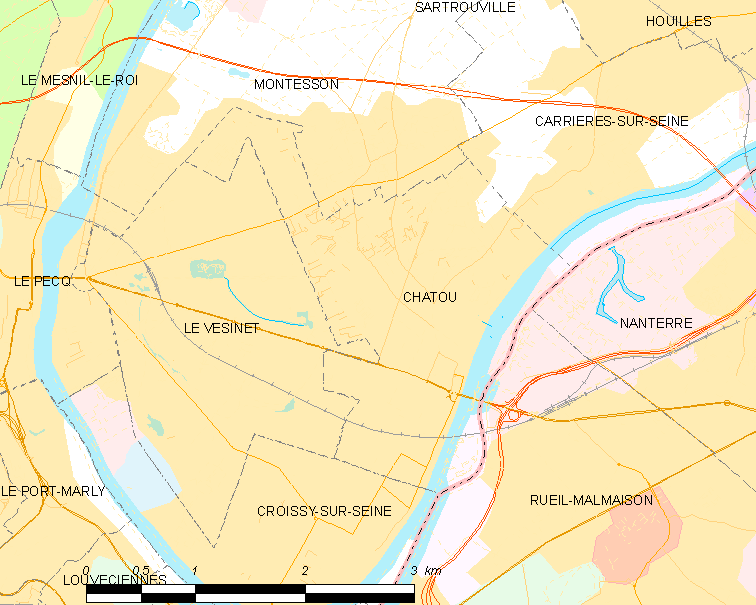
- Loop of the Seine River
- Headquarters: Syndicat intercommunal à vocations multiples (SIVOM) des Coteaux de Seine; Marly-le-Roi
- Region served: Yvelines; Hauts-de-Seine
- Members: 10 communes
- President: Pierre Lequiller
- Website: pays-des-impressionnistes.fr

The Pays des Impressionnistes (French pronunciation: [pei dez‿ɛ̃pʁesjɔnist], lit. 'Land of the Impressionists') is a certification mark created by the Syndicat intercommunal à vocations multiples des Coteaux de Seine in 2001 to promote the cultural heritage of this touristic area.

Nine communes in the Yvelines department of France bordering the loop of the Seine, where, during the second half of the 19th century, Impressionist painters exercised their art, were initially associated with this creation: Bougival, Carrières-sur-Seine, Chatou, Croissy-sur-Seine, Le Pecq, Le Port-Marly, Louveciennes, Marly-le-Roi and Noisy-le-Roi. There is the Path of the Impressionists, four hiking trails dotted with reproductions of paintings, reflecting the still remarkable character of this landscape of Impressionist sites which has been proposed for inclusion as a World Heritage Site since 2009.

Rueil-Malmaison, in the neighbouring Hauts-de-Seine department, joined them in 2010, when eight of these communes entrusted the development of the Pays des Impressionnistes to the visitor centre of Marly-le-Roi, which organises 'Impressionist cruises' along the Seine, as well as visits of ateliers of contemporary painters.

== The Path of the Impressionists ==
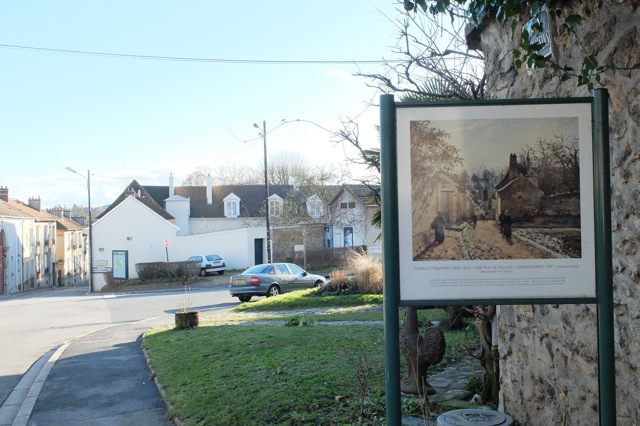
Copy of Une rue de village, Louveciennes by Camille Pissarro

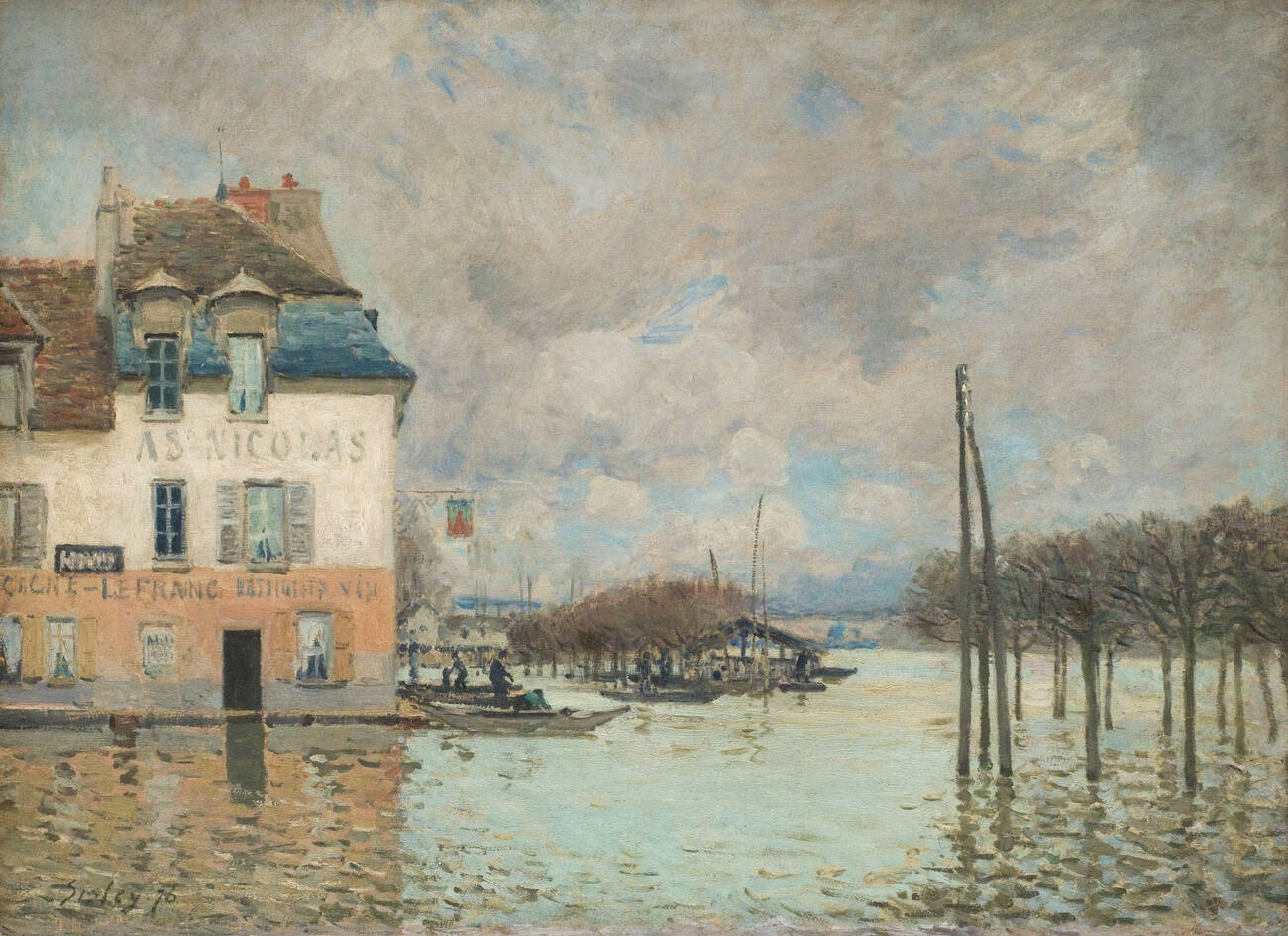
L'Inondation à Port-Marly (1876) by Alfred Sisley

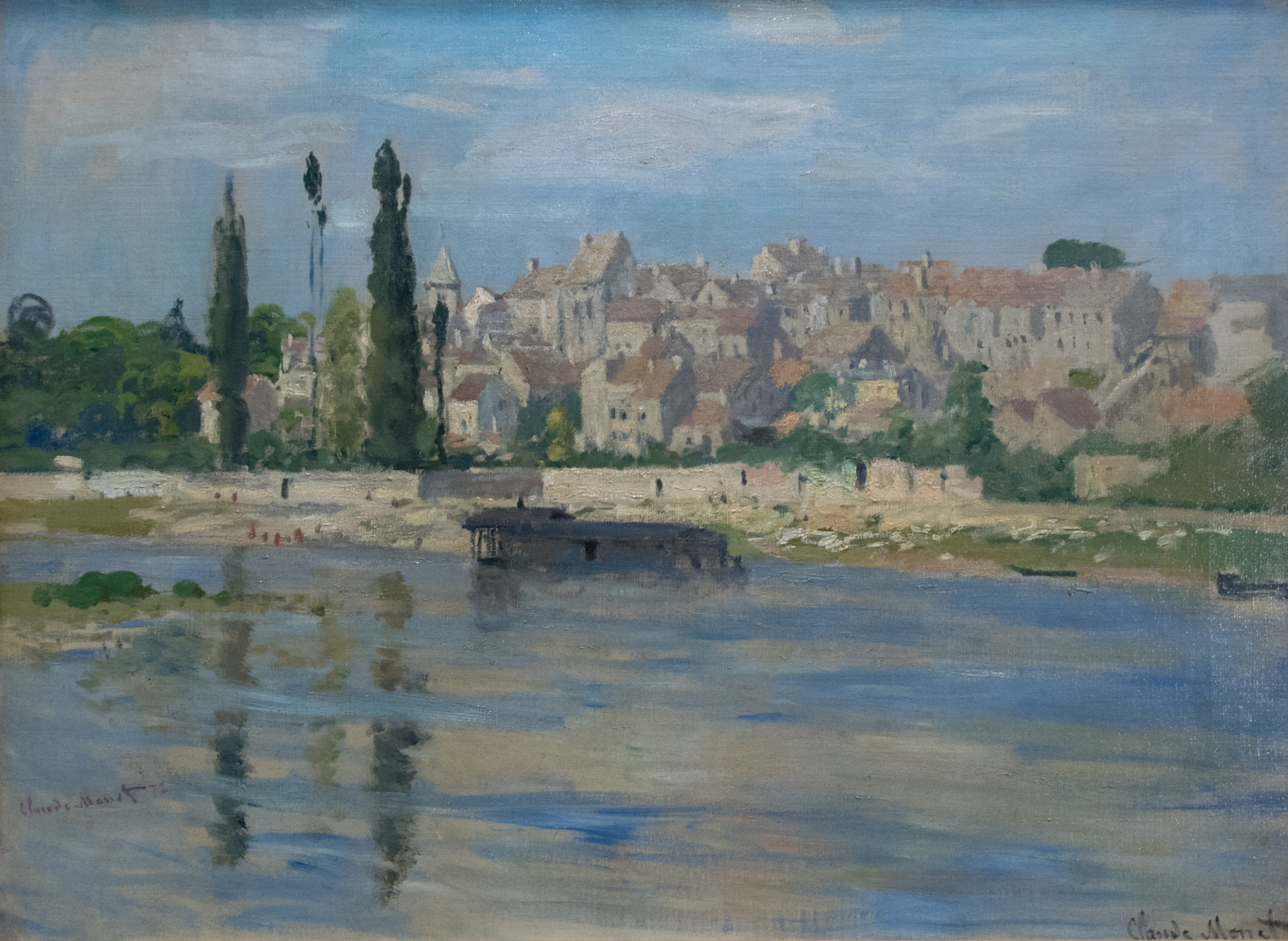
Carrières-Saint-Denis by Claude Monet

There are four Impressionists' Trail paths with more than 30 reproductions of Claude Monet, Auguste Renoir, Camille Pissarro and Alfred Sisley paintings on the spot of their creation.

- The Sisley Path is a trail of 3.15 km, from Le Pecq-sur-Seine to Port-Marly. There are 6 reproductions: Vue du château de Saint-Germain-en-Laye (1832) by William Turner, La Seine et le Pecq (1906) by Maurice de Vlaminck; 2 versions of L'Inondation à Port-Marly (1876), Une rue à Marly ou place de marché (1876) by Alfred Sisley et Port-Marly, le lavoir (1872) by Camille Pissarro.
- The Pissarro Path is a trail of 6.6 km, from Louveciennes, going through Marly-le-Roi and arriving at Bougival. There are about 15 reproductions: in Louveciennes, La route de Versailles (1895) by Pierre-Auguste Renoir; Place du Chenil à Marly, effet de neige and L'abreuvoir de Marly, gelée blanche, (1876) by Alfred Sisley, Vue de Marly-le-Roi (1870) by Camille Pissarro; Chemin de la Machine, Louveciennes (1873) by Alfred Sisley and Le Village de Voisins (1872) by Camille Pissarro. Then, there is Hauteurs de Marly, ferme de mi-côte (1870) by Alfred Sisley, and Une rue de village, Louveciennes (1871) by Pissarro. Then, L'aqueduc de Marly (1874) by Sisley and Entrée du village de Voisins (1872) by Pissarro. Then comes Le Château du Pont (1948) by Jeanne Baudot, a student of Renoir from Louveciennes. Then, Printemps à Louveciennes (1870) by Pissarro. Finally, in Bougival, there are Restaurant à Bougival (vers 1905) by Maurice de Vlaminck, Route de Saint-Germain à Marly-le-Roi (1872) and Barrage de la Machine de Marly (1876) by Alfred Sisley.
- The Monet is a trail of 4.25 km, from Chatou, going through Croissy-sur-Seine et and arriving at Bougival. There are 5 reproductions: Le pont du chemin de fer à Chatou (1881) and La Grenouillère (1869) by Pierre-Auguste Renoir, Bain à la Grenouillère (1869) and Le pont de Bougival (1869-1870) by Claude Monet, and Bords de Seine (1883) par Berthe Morisot.
- The Renoir is a trail of 3.6 km, from Chatou arriving at Carrières-sur-Seine. There are 5 reproductions: Le Déjeuner des Canotiers (1880–1881) and Les canotiers à Chatou (vers 1879) by Pierre-Auguste Renoir, Le pont de Chatou (1906–1907) by Maurice de Vlaminck, Carrières-Saint-Denis (1878) by Claude Monet and Le Village (1905) by Maurice de Vlaminck.

== Visitor centre ==
From 2011, the visitor centre of Marly-le-Roy became that of the Pays des Impressionnistes, gathering Carrières-sur-Seine, Chatou, Croissy-sur-Seine, Le Pecq, Le Port-Marly, Louveciennes, Marly-le-Roi and Rueil-Malmaison.

It organises 'Impressionists cruises' from April to October along the shores and islands of the loop of the Seine.

It also organises visits of contemporary painters ateliers, such as those of Catherine Vaes in Croissy in 2012, and Claude-Max Lochu in Carrières-sur-Seine in 2014.
