= Second Impressionist Exhibition =

19th-century art exhibition

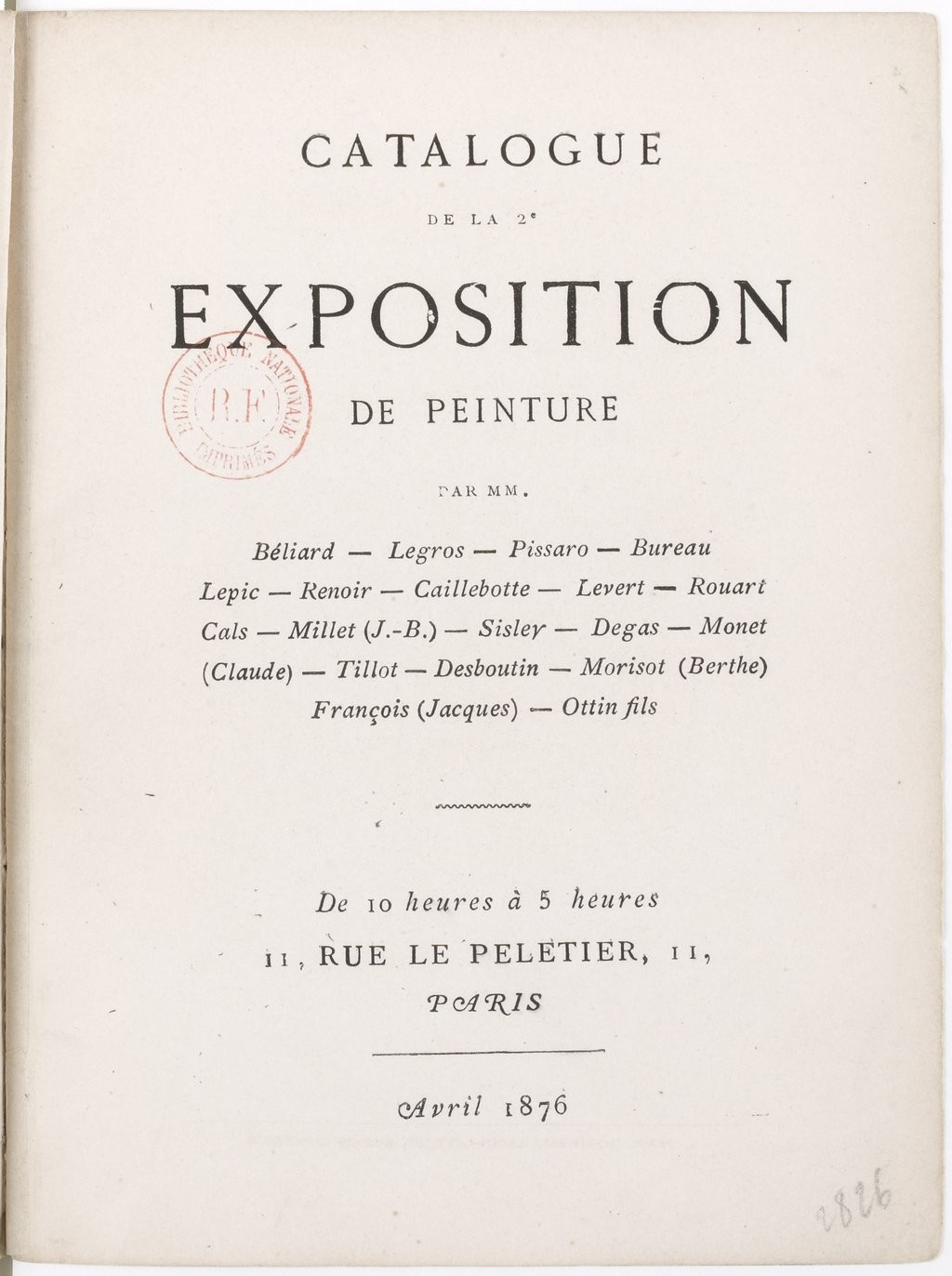
- Title page of the catalog of the Second Impressionist Exhibition
- Native name: 2nd Exposition de Peinture
- Date: April 1876
- Venue: 11 Rue Le Peletier
- Location: Paris, France
- Type: Art exhibition
- Organized by: Société anonyme des artistes peintres, sculpteurs, graveurs, etc.

The Second Impressionist Exhibition was an art exhibition held by Société anonyme des artistes peintres, sculpteurs, graveurs, etc. (Note: English: "Anonymous Society of painters, sculptors, engravers, etc.") in Paris, France in 1876. It was the second exhibition held by the group following the First Impressionist Exhibition two years earlier in 1874.

== History ==
In April 1876, the Impressionists held a second public exhibition. The Second Impressionist Exhibition was held in Paul Durand-Ruel's gallery at 11 rue Le Peletier. About two-hundred fifty paintings by twenty artists were shown at the exhibition. In contrast with the first first show, the paintings were grouped by artist, rather than commingling them. Seventeen of the artists that participated in the first exhibition, notably Paul Cézanne, did not participate in the second show. The second show did, however, include some newcomers, such as Gustave Caillebotte. Édouard Manet once again declined to participate, and after being rejected from the Salon of 1876, instead held his own solo show at his studio.

== Reception ==
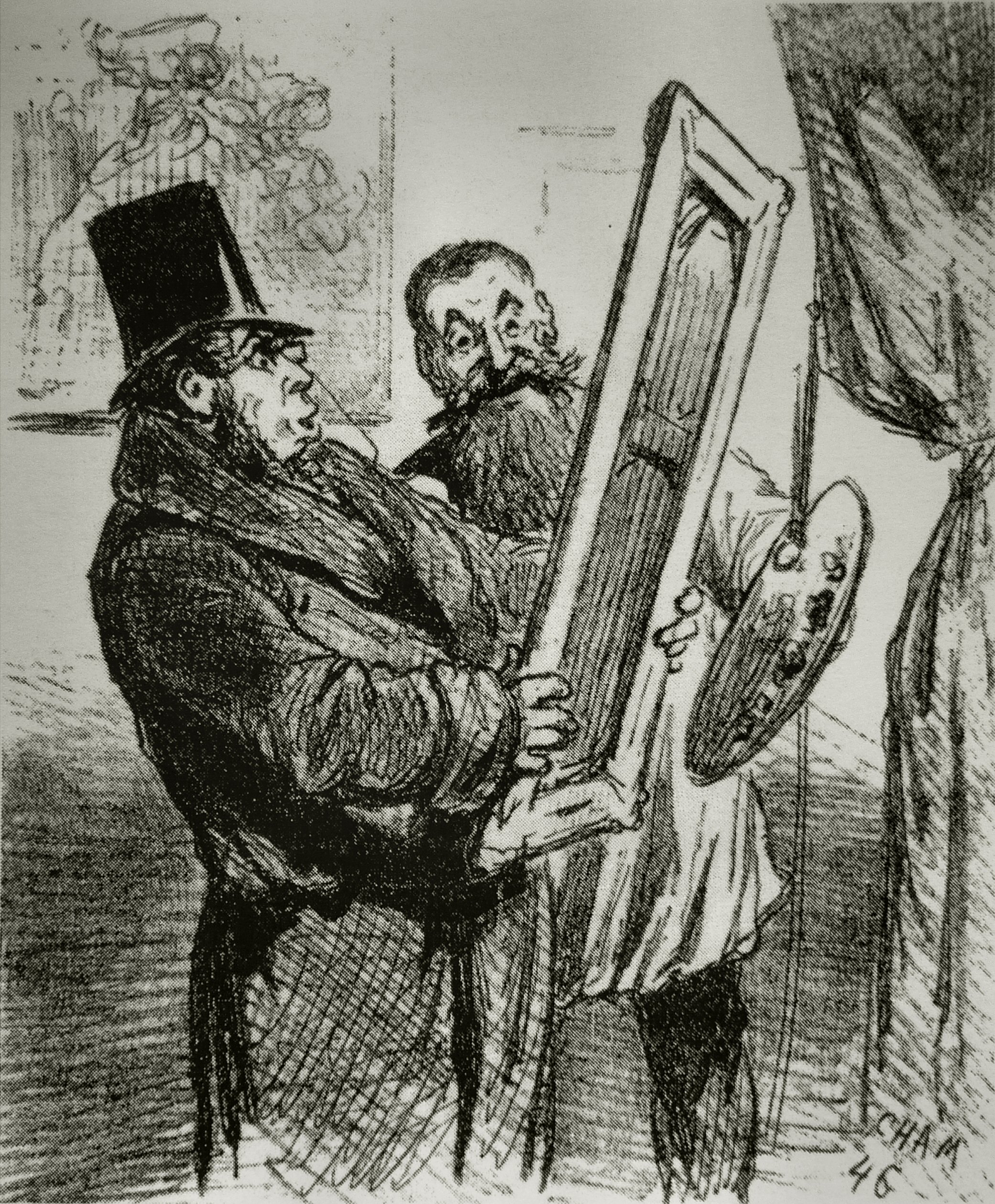
Caricature by Amédée de Noé depicting the Second Impressionist Exhibition

The Second Impressionist Exhibition had fewer visitors overall compared the First Impressionist Exhibition. The press, however, was just as vicious as with the first.

Writing Le Figaro, Albert Wolff called the exhibition a dissaster and compared it to previous Opera house fire. He particularly criticized the Impressionist's use of colors. In regards to Renoir's Torse de femme au soleil, Wolff compared the colors of the woman's skin to that of a rotting corpse. In response to this article, Berthe Morisot's husband Eugène Manet considered challening Wolff to a duel, but was dissuaded.

== Participating artists ==
The exhibition catalog lists nineteen artists as participated in the Second Impressionist Exhibition in 1876.

- Édouard Béliard
- Pierre-Isidore Bureau
- Gustave Caillebotte
- Adolphe-Félix Cals
- Edgar Degas
- Marcellin Desboutin
- Jacques François
- Alphonse Legros
- Léopold Levert
- Ludovic-Napoléon Lepic
- Jean-Baptiste Millet
- Claude Monet
- Berthe Morisot
- Léon-Auguste Ottin
- Camille Pissarro
- Pierre-Auguste Renoir
- Stanislas-Henri Rouart
- Alfred Sisley
- Charles Tillot

== List of artworks ==
The exhibition catalog for the Second Impressionist Exhibition lists artworks numbered 1 through 252. Several of these entries contain multiple artworks each. Four artworks were shown at the exhibition hors catalogue ("out of catalog"), meaning that they were exhibited but were not listed in the catalog. These artworks have been identified as being displayed at the exhibition through references in contemporary reviews. These hors catalogue artworks are numbered as "HC#" in the list below.

Artworks at the Second Impressionist Exhibition
No.	Title	Image	Artist	Date	Technique	Dimensions	Current location	Notes
1.	Bords de l'Oise		Edouard Béliard	1875	Oil on canvas	74 cm × 94 cm (29 in × 37 in)	Musée d'Étampes	
2.	Fabriques au bord de l'Oise		Edouard Béliard					
3.	Rue de village		Edouard Béliard					
4.	La Rue de Chaufour à Etampes. Effet de neige.		Edouard Béliard					
5.	Port de Granville		Edouard Béliard					
6.	Rue de l'Hermitage, à Pontoise		Edouard Béliard					
7.	Ru Dorée, à Pontoise		Edouard Béliard					
8.	Promenade des Fossés, à Pontoise		Edouard Béliard	1872	Oil on canvas	55 cm × 46 cm (22 in × 18 in)	Musée Tavet-Delacour	
9.	Route de Champagne, près l'Isle-Adam		Edouard Béliard					
10.	Jouy-leComte, clair de lune		Edouard Béliard					
11.	Château de Valmondois		Edouard Béliard					
12.	Entrèe de village à Champagne, près l'Isle-Adam		Edouard Béliard					
13.	Meules au clair de lune		Edouard Béliard					
14.	Entrèe de Nesles		Edouard Béliard					
15.	A voines dans la plaine de Champagne		Edouard Béliard					
16.	Usine à Pacy-sur-Eure		Edouard Béliard					
17.	Raboteurs de parquets		Gustave Caillebotte	1875	Oil on canvas	100 cm × 145.4 cm (39.4 in × 57.2 in)	Musée d'Orsay, Paris	
18.	Raboteurs de parquets		Gustave Caillebotte	1876	Oil on canvas	80 cm × 100 cm (31 in × 39 in)	Private collection	
19.	Jeune Homme jouant du piano		Gustave Caillebotte	1876	Oil on canvas	80 cm × 116 cm (31 in × 46 in)	Private collection	
20.	Jeune homme à sa fenêtre (Young Man at His Window)		Gustave Caillebotte	1876	Oil on canvas	116.2 cm × 81 cm (45.7 in × 31.9 in)	J. Paul Getty Museum	
21.	Déjeûner		Gustave Caillebotte	1876	Oil on canvas	52 cm × 75 cm (20 in × 30 in)	Private collection	
22.	Jardin		Gustave Caillebotte					
23.	Jardin		Gustave Caillebotte					
24.	Après déjeûner		Gustave Caillebotte					
25.	Soleil couchant		Adolphe-Félix Cals					
26.	Ferme de Saint-Siméon, Printemps		Adolphe-Félix Cals					
27.	Sous les arbres		Adolphe-Félix Cals					
28.	Madelaine		Adolphe-Félix Cals					
29.	Femme allaitant son enfant		Adolphe-Félix Cals					
30.	A la Ferme de Saint-Siméon (Sunday at the Saint-Siméon Farm)		Adolphe-Félix Cals	1876	Oil on canvas	60 cm × 120 cm (24 in × 47 in)	Unknown	
31.	Cour à Honfleur (Intérieur de cour à Honfleur)	(No free image)	Adolphe-Félix Cals	1872	Oil on canvas	54.5 cm × 64.5 cm (21.5 in × 25.4 in)	Unknown	
32.	La Leçon		Adolphe-Félix Cals					
33.	Portrait de Mme X...		Adolphe-Félix Cals		Drawing			
34.	Les Enfants de pêcheur		Adolphe-Félix Cals					
35.	Le Repas frugal		Adolphe-Félix Cals					
36.	Portraits dans un bureau (Nouvelle-Orléans) (A Cotton Office in New Orleans)		Edgar Degas	1873	Oil on canvas	73 cm × 92 cm (29 in × 36 in)	Musée des beaux-arts de Pau	
37.	Examen de danse (The Dance Class)		Edgar Degas	1874	Oil on canvas	82.6 cm × 76.2 cm (32.5 in × 30.0 in)	Metropolitan Museum of Art, New York	
38.	Portrait de M. E. M... (Portrait of Eugene Manet)		Edgar Degas	1874	Oil on canvas	65 cm × 81 cm (26 in × 32 in)	Private collection	
39.	Portrait de femme (ébauche) (Madame Théodore Gobillard)		Edgar Degas	1869	Oil on canvas	54.3 cm × 65.1 cm (21.4 in × 25.6 in)	Metropolitan Museum of Art, New York	
40.	Cour d'une maison (Nouvelle-Orléans, esquisse) (Enfants assis sur le seuil d'une maison)		Edgar Degas	1873	Oil on canvas	60 cm × 75 cm (24 in × 30 in)	The Ordrupgaard Collection, Copenhagen, Denmark	
41.	Blanchisseuses (Women Ironing)		Edgar Degas	c. 1875–76 c. 1882–86	Oil on canvas	82.5 cm × 75 cm (32.5 in × 29.5 in)	Norton Simon Museum, Pasadena, California	
42.	Ebauche de portrait		Edgar Degas		Pastel			
43.	Portrait, le soir (Melancholy), (Portrait, le soir)		Edgar Degas	1860's	Oil on canvas	19 cm × 24.7 cm (7.5 in × 9.7 in)	The Phillips Collection, Washington D.C.	(Note: Two paintings have been suggested as being entry number 43, Portrait, le soir. One of these two painting was shown at the Exhibition.)
43.	Portrait, le soir (Madame Camus), (Portrait, le soir)		Edgar Degas	c. 1869–70	Oil on canvas	72.7 cm × 92.1 cm (28.6 in × 36.3 in)	National Gallery of Art, Washington, D.C.	
44.	Salle de danse (La Répétition au foyer de la danse)		Edgar Degas	c. 1870-72	Oil on canvas	40.6 cm × 54.6 cm (16.0 in × 21.5 in)	The Phillips Collection, Washington D.C.	
45.	Id.							
47.	Coulisses		Edgar Degas	c. 1874-76	Oil on canvas	73.5 cm × 59.5 cm (28.9 in × 23.4 in)	Art Institute of Chicago	
48.	Id.							
49.	Blanchisseuse (silhouette)		Edgar Degas	1873	Oil on canvas	54.3 cm × 39.4 cm (21.4 in × 15.5 in)	Metropolitan Museum of Art, New York	
50.	Blanchisseuse portrait du linge							
51.	Divers croquis de danseuses (Various dancer sketches): 1. Danseuse rajustant son chausson 2. Danseuse debout, de dos		Edgar Degas		Thinned oil paint and sepia on pink paper	40 cm × 32 cm (16 in × 13 in)	Private collection	
51.	Divers croquis de danseuses (Various dancer sketches): 1. Danseuse rajustant son chausson 2. Danseuse debout, de dos		Edgar Degas		Essence on pink paper	39.4 cm × 27.8 cm (15.5 in × 10.9 in)	Cabinet des dessins, Louvre, Paris	
52.	Dans un Café (L'Absinthe)							(Note: Listed in the catalogue, but probably not exhibited.)
53.	Orchestre		Edgar Degas					
54.	Blanchisseuse		Edgar Degas					
55.	Femme se lavant le soir		Edgar Degas					
56.	Petites Paysannes se baignant à la mer vers le soir		Edgar Degas	1875	Oil on canvas	65.1 cm × 81 cm (25.6 in × 31.9 in)	McLean Collection, Northern Ireland	
57.	Modiste		Edgar Degas					
58.	Portrait		Edgar Degas					
59.	Blanchisseuse		Edgar Degas		Drawing			
HC1.	Les Danseuses		Edgar Degas					
60.	Chanteurs des rues		Marcellin Desboutin	1872	Drypoint	30.5 cm × 21.7 cm (12.0 in × 8.5 in)	Cabinet des estampes, Bibliothèque nationale, Paris	
61.	Etude d'Enfant		Marcellin Desboutin					
62.	Portrait of Jean-Baptiste Faure	(No image)	Marcellin Desboutin		Oil on canvas	40.6 cm × 37.5 cm (16.0 in × 14.8 in)	Wheelock Whitney & Company, New York	
63.	Les Premiers Pas	(No image)	Marcellin Desboutin		Engraving	19.8 cm × 28 cm (7.8 in × 11.0 in)	Unknown	
62.	Portrait de M. F...		Marcellin Desboutin					
63.	Les Premiers pas		Marcellin Desboutin					
64.	Le Violoncelliste		Marcellin Desboutin					
65.	Tête d'Etude		Marcellin Desboutin					
66.	Portrait (Portrait od M^{me} Hector de Callias)		Marcellin Desboutin	1879	Etching and drypoint	24 cm × 16 cm (9.4 in × 6.3 in)	Fine Arts Museums of San Francisco	
67.	Portraits et Etudes (Jules Jacquemart, graveur)		Marcellin Desboutin	1876	Etching	16 cm × 12.2 cm (6.3 in × 4.8 in)	Fine Arts Museums of San Francisco	
68.	Portraits et Etudes (Norbert Gœneutte, peintre)		Marcellin Desboutin	1876	Drypoint	24.7 cm × 15.9 cm (9.7 in × 6.3 in)	The Metropolitan Museum of Art, New York	
69.	Portraits et Etudes (Henri Rouart, peintre et collectionneur)		Marcellin Desboutin	1875	Etching	27.2 cm × 20 cm (10.7 in × 7.9 in)	The Metropolitan Museum of Art, New York	
70.	Portraits		Marcellin Desboutin		Drypoint			
71.	Portraits (Leroy, imprimeur d'eaux-fortes)	(No image)	Marcellin Desboutin		Etching and drypoint	29.5 cm × 20.9 cm (11.6 in × 8.2 in)	Cabinet des estampes, Bibliothèque nationale, Paris	
72.	Portraits		Marcellin Desboutin		Drypoint			
73.	Raisins		Jacues François					
74.	Prunes		Jacues François					
75.	Estamo de tabacco à l'Alhambra		Jacues François					
76.	Portrait de M^{me} M...		Jacues François					
77.	La Dessert		Jacues François					
78.	Roses jaunes et Raisin		Jacues François					
79.	Raisin et Grenades		Jacues François					
80.	Raisin et Grenade		Jacues François					
81.	1. Les Baigneuses; 2. La Procession; 3. Ambulance; 4. Prominade; 5. Tribunal; 6. Cours de médicine 7. Chantres espagnols		Alphonse Legros		Drypoint	33.5 cm × 23 cm (13.2 in × 9.1 in)	Cabinet des estampes, Bibliothèque nationale, Paris	
81.	1. Les Baigneuses; 2. La Procession; 3. Ambulance; 4. Prominade; 5. Tribunal; 6. Cours de médicine 7. Chantres espagnols	(No image)	Alphonse Legros		Etching	42 cm × 23 cm (16.5 in × 9.1 in)	Cabinet des estampes, Bibliothèque nationale, Paris	
81.	1. Les Baigneuses; 2. La Procession; 3. Ambulance; 4. Prominade; 5. Tribunal; 6. Cours de médicine 7. Chantres espagnols	(No image)	Alphonse Legros		Etching	37 cm × 26.5 cm (14.6 in × 10.4 in)	Cabinet des estampes, Bibliothèque nationale, Paris	
81.	1. Les Baigneuses; 2. La Procession; 3. Ambulance; 4. Prominade; 5. Tribunal; 6. Cours de médicine 7. Chantres espagnols		Alphonse Legros		Drypoint	28 cm × 20 cm (11.0 in × 7.9 in)	Cabinet des estampes, Bibliothèque nationale, Paris	
81.	1. Les Baigneuses; 2. La Procession; 3. Ambulance; 4. Prominade; 5. Tribunal; 6. Cours de médicine 7. Chantres espagnols	(No image)	Alphonse Legros		Drypoint on laid paper	21 cm × 29.8 cm (8.3 in × 11.7 in)	Cabinet des estampes, Bibliothèque nationale, Paris	
81.	1. Les Baigneuses; 2. La Procession; 3. Ambulance; 4. Prominade; 5. Tribunal; 6. Cours de médicine 7. Chantres espagnols		Alphonse Legros		Etching	24 cm × 31.5 cm (9.4 in × 12.4 in)	Cabinet des estampes, Bibliothèque nationale, Paris	
81.	1. Les Baigneuses; 2. La Procession; 3. Ambulance; 4. Prominade; 5. Tribunal; 6. Cours de médicine 7. Chantres espagnols		Alphonse Legros		Etching	27.1 cm × 37 cm (10.7 in × 14.6 in)	Cabinet des estampes, Bibliothèque nationale, Paris	
82.	La Morte		Alphonse Legros		Etching and aquatint	55 cm × 39 cm (22 in × 15 in)	Cabinet des estampes, Bibliothèque nationale, Paris	
83.	1. Les Vagabonds de Montrouge; 2. Le Confrérie de la Sainte-Vierge; 3. Prés de la cheminée 4. Paysage; 5. Deux Lithographies; 6. Portrait de M. Barbey d'Aurevilly		Alphonse Legros		Etching	26.7 cm × 36.9 cm (10.5 in × 14.5 in)	Cabinet des estampes, Bibliothèque nationale, Paris	
83.	1. Les Vagabonds de Montrouge; 2. Le Confrérie de la Sainte-Vierge; 3. Prés de la cheminée 4. Paysage; 5. Deux Lithographies; 6. Portrait de M. Barbey d'Aurevilly		Alphonse Legros	1860	Etching and drypoing	37 cm × 26.7 cm (14.6 in × 10.5 in)	The Boston Public Library, Print Department	
83.	1. Les Vagabonds de Montrouge; 2. Le Confrérie de la Sainte-Vierge; 3. Prés de la cheminée 4. Paysage; 5. Deux Lithographies; 6. Portrait de M. Barbey d'Aurevilly		Alphonse Legros		Etching	23 cm × 15.7 cm (9.1 in × 6.2 in)	Cabinet des estampes, Bibliothèque nationale, Paris	
83.	1. Les Vagabonds de Montrouge; 2. Le Confrérie de la Sainte-Vierge; 3. Prés de la cheminée 4. Paysage; 5. Deux Lithographies; 6. Portrait de M. Barbey d'Aurevilly		Alphonse Legros		Etching and drypoint	32.5 cm × 25.9 cm (12.8 in × 10.2 in)	The Boston Public Library, Print Department	
83.	1. Les Vagabonds de Montrouge; 2. Le Confrérie de la Sainte-Vierge; 3. Prés de la cheminée 4. Paysage; 5. Deux Lithographies; 6. Portrait de M. Barbey d'Aurevilly	(No Image on Commons yet)	Alphonse Legros		Lithograph	17.4 cm × 28.9 cm (6.9 in × 11.4 in)	Cabinet des estampes, Bibliothèque nationale, Paris	
83.	1. Les Vagabonds de Montrouge; 2. Le Confrérie de la Sainte-Vierge; 3. Prés de la cheminée 4. Paysage; 5. Deux Lithographies; 6. Portrait de M. Barbey d'Aurevilly		Aphonse Legros		Etching	12.8 cm × 9.8 cm (5.0 in × 3.9 in)	Cabinet des estampes, Bibliothèque nationale, Paris	
84.	Lutrin (Le Lutrin No. 2)		Alphonse Legros		Etching	12.8 cm × 9.8 cm (5.0 in × 3.9 in)	Cabinet des estampes, Bibliothèque nationale, Paris	
85.	Portrait de petite Fille (La Petite Marie)		Alphonse Legros		Drypoint on Japanese paper	23.2 cm × 16.9 cm (9.1 in × 6.7 in)	The Boston Public Library, Print Department	
86.	Bonhomme misère		Alphonse Legros		Etching	23 cm × 15.3 cm (9.1 in × 6.0 in)	AchenBach Foundation for Graphic Arts, San Francisco	
87.	Portrait de l'historien Carlysle		Alphonse Legros		Etching and drypoint	44.8 cm × 35.2 cm (17.6 in × 13.9 in)	The Boston Public Library	
88.	Tête de Viellard		Alphonse Legros		Dryoint			
88.	Femmes de Boulogne		Alphonse Legros					
89.	Grand Paysage, coup de vent		Alphonse Legros					
90.	L'Homme au Mouton		Alphonse Legros					
91.	La Communion		Alphonse Legros					
92.	Paysage		Alphonse Legros					
93.	Vue de Portrieux		Léopold Levert					
94.	Plage de Portrieux		Léopold Levert					
95.	Port de Portrieux		Léopold Levert					
96.	La Jetée de Portrieux		Léopold Levert					
97.	Bords de l'Essonne		Léopold Levert					
98.	Maison à Vaulry		Léopold Levert					
99.	La Ferme de Saint-Marc		Léopold Levert					
100.	Vue prise a Buttier		Léopold Levert					
101.	Le Chemin Vert á Noiseau		Léopold Levert					
102.	L'Ile de Vacheru (clair de lune)		Ludovic-Napoléon Lepic					
103.	Effet de brouillard en mer		Ludovic-Napoléon Lepic					
104.	Etude de bateaux		Ludovic-Napoléon Lepic					
105.	La Plage de Berck		Ludovic-Napoléon Lepic					
106.	Le Christ de la Plage de Berck		Ludovic-Napoléon Lepic					
107.	Bateaux de la baie de Somme		Ludovic-Napoléon Lepic					
108.	Un Brisant (Etude)		Ludovic-Napoléon Lepic					
109.	La Plage de Hourdel		Ludovic-Napoléon Lepic					
110.	Le Beaupré		Ludovic-Napoléon Lepic					
111.	Forcé !		Ludovic-Napoléon Lepic					
112.	Bateaux de la plage de Berck		Ludovic-Napoléon Lepic					
113.	:a Bouée N° 2, Baie de Somme		Ludovic-Napoléon Lepic					
114.	Clair de Lune en mer (Manche)		Ludovic-Napoléon Lepic					
115.	Effet de Soleil (Manche)		Ludovic-Napoléon Lepic					
116.	La Plage de Cayeux (Effet de nuit)		Ludovic-Napoléon Lepic					
117.	Le Halage d'un bateau		Ludovic-Napoléon Lepic					
118.	Un Cabestan		Ludovic-Napoléon Lepic					
119.	Le Voilier		Ludovic-Napoléon Lepic					
120.	Bateau à sec		Ludovic-Napoléon Lepic					
121.	Le Charpentier		Ludovic-Napoléon Lepic					
122.	La Plage		Ludovic-Napoléon Lepic					
123.	Le Chantier de Cayeux		Ludovic-Napoléon Lepic					
124.	Pompei (5 Aquarelles d'après nature)		Ludovic-Napoléon Lepic		Watercolor			
125.	Le Quai Sancte Lucià à Naples		Ludovic-Napoléon Lepic		Watercolor			
126.	Filets (2 Aquarelles)		Ludovic-Napoléon Lepic		Watercolor			
127.	Barque échouée (Baie de Somme) (2 Aquarelles)		Ludovic-Napoléon Lepic		Watercolor			
128.	Falaises du Tréport		Ludovic-Napoléon Lepic		Watercolor			
129.	Soleil en mer		Ludovic-Napoléon Lepic					
130.	L'Eglise de Cayeux		Ludovic-Napoléon Lepic		Watercolor			
131.	Barque Napolitaine		Ludovic-Napoléon Lepic					
132.	Les Souterrains du port de Naples		Ludovic-Napoléon Lepic		Watercolor			
133.	Fontaine à la Cava, près Naples		Ludovic-Napoléon Lepic		Watercolor			
134.	La Ballade de Pendus		Ludovic-Napoléon Lepic		Etching			
135.	Croquis Hollandais (2 Cadres)		Ludovic-Napoléon Lepic		Etching			
136.	Canal en Hollande, lever de Lune		Ludovic-Napoléon Lepic		Etching			
137.	Tête de Chein. Epreuve tirée sur plaque sans gravure		Ludovic-Napoléon Lepic					
138.	Femme gardant les Vaches		Jean-Baptiste Millet		Watercolor			
139.	La Ferme		Jean-Baptiste Millet		Watercolor			
140.	La Chaumière		Jean-Baptiste Millet		Watercolor			
141.	Moulin à eau		Jean-Baptiste Millet		Watercolor			
142.	Coin de Ferme		Jean-Baptiste Millet					
143.	Ferme du Fays		Jean-Baptiste Millet					
144.	Le Pré		Jean-Baptiste Millet					
145.	Le Verger (Sépia)		Jean-Baptiste Millet					
146.	Le Labourage (Sépia rehaussée)		Jean-Baptiste Millet					
147.	La Fermière		Jean-Baptiste Millet		Watercolor			
148.	Le Petit bras (Argenteuil)		Claude Monet					
149.	La Seine à Argenteuil		Claude Monet	1875	Oil on canvas	59.7 cm × 81.3 cm (23.5 in × 32.0 in)	San Francisco Museum of Modern Art	
150.	La Chemin d'Epinay. Effet de neige		Claude Monet	1875–1876	Oil on canvas	60 cm × 100 cm (24 in × 39 in)	Albright-Knox Art Gallery, Buffalo, New York	
151.	La Plage à Sainte-Adresse		Claude Monet	1867	Oil on canvas	75.8 cm × 102.5 cm (29.8 in × 40.4 in)	The Art Institute of Chicago	
152.	Le Pont du chemin de fer (Argenteuil)		Claude Monet	1873	Oil on canvas	66 cm × 99 cm (26 in × 39 in)	Private Collection	
153.	Japonnerie		Claude Monet	1876	Oil on canvas	231.8 cm × 142.3 cm (91.3 in × 56.0 in)	Museum of Fine Arts, Boston	
154.	La Prairie		Claude Monet	1874	Oil on canvas	57 cm × 80 cm (22 in × 31 in)	National Gallery, Berlin	
156.	Le Pont d'Argenteuil		Claude Monet	1874	Oil on canvas	60 cm × 80 cm (24 in × 31 in)	Musée d'Orsay, Paris	
158.	Effet d'Automne		Claude Monet	1874	Oil on canvas	54 cm × 73 cm (21 in × 29 in)	Collection of Mrs. John Hay Whitney, New York	
159.	Les Dalhias		Claude Monet	1875	Oil on canvas	54 cm × 65.5 cm (21.3 in × 25.8 in)	Nàrodni Galeri, Prague	
160.	Les Bateaux d'Argenteuil		Claude Monet	1875	Oil on canvas			
161.	La Promenade		Claude Monet	1875	Oil on canvas	100 cm × 81 cm (39 in × 32 in)	National Gallery of Art, Washington D.C.	
162.	Paneau décoratif		Claude Monet	1873	Oil on canvas	162 cm × 203 cm (64 in × 80 in)	Musée d'Orsay	
163.	Le Printemps		Claude Monet	1872	Oil on canvas	57.5 cm × 69.5 cm (22.6 in × 27.4 in)	The Union League Club of Chicago	
164.	Les Bains de la Grenouillère		Claude Monet	1869	Oil on canvas	74.6 cm × 99.7 cm (29.4 in × 39.3 in)	The Metropolitan Museum of Art, New York	
165.	Bateaux de pêche. (Etude)		Claude Monet					
HC2.	La Liseuse or Springtime		Claude Monet	1872	Oil on canvas	50 cm × 65 cm (20 in × 26 in)	The Walters Art Gallery, Baltimore	
166.	Au Bal		Berthe Morisot	1874	Oil on canvas	62 cm × 52 cm (24 in × 20 in)	Musée Marmottan, Paris	
167.	Le Lever		Berthe Morisot		Oil on canvas	46 cm × 38 cm (18 in × 15 in)	Unknown	
168.	La Toilette		Berthe Morisot	1874	Oil on canvas	54 cm × 45 cm (21 in × 18 in)	Private collection	
169.	Déjeûner sur l'herbe		Berthe Morisot	1875	Oil on canvas	60 cm × 74 cm (24 in × 29 in)	Private collection	
170.	Vude du Solent (Ile de Wight)		Berthe Morisot					
171.	West Cowes (Ile de Wight)		Berthe Morisot					
172.	Le Bateau à vapeur		Berthe Morisot	1875	Oil on canvas	32 cm × 45 cm (13 in × 18 in)	Unknown	
173.	Plage de Fécamp		Berthe Morisot	1873	Oil on canvas	24 cm × 51 cm (9.4 in × 20.1 in)	Unknown	
174.	Un Chantier		Berthe Morisot	1874	Oil on canvas	33 cm × 41 cm (13 in × 16 in)	Private collection	
175.	Un Percher de Blanchisseuse		Berthe Morisot	1875	Oil on canvas	33 cm × 40.6 cm (13.0 in × 16.0 in)	National Gallery of Art, Washington D.C.	
176.	Vue d'Angleterre	(No Image on Commons)	Berther Morisot		Oil on canvas	46 cm × 56 cm (18 in × 22 in)	Unknown	
177.	Vue d'Angleterre		Berthe Morisot	1875	Oil on canvas	38 cm × 46 cm (15 in × 18 in)	Private collection	
178.	Figure de femme		Berthe Morisot	1875	Oil on canvas	57 cm × 31 cm (22 in × 12 in)	Galerie Schröder un Leisewitz, Bremen, Germany	
179.	Avant d'un yacht		Berthe Morisot	1875	Watercolor over pencil sketch	21 cm × 26.7 cm (8.3 in × 10.5 in)	Sterling and Francine Clark Art Institute, Williamstown, Massachusetts	
180.	Entrée de la Midina. Ile de Wight		Berthe Morisot		Watercolor over graphite on off-white paper	19 cm × 17.4 cm (7.5 in × 6.9 in)	Fogg Art Museum	
181.	Vue de la Tamise		Berthe Morisot	1875	Watercolor on paper	17 cm × 23 cm (6.7 in × 9.1 in)	Unknown	
182.	Trois dessins au pastel		Berthe Morisot					
183.	La Maison Bleue (Butte Montmartre)		Léon-Auguste Ottin					
184.	Mont Cassin. Versand sud. (Butte Montmartre)		Léon-Auguste Ottin					
185.	En plen Soileil. Versant sud. (Butte Montmartre)		Léon-Auguste Ottin					
186.	Sur le Versant nord. (Butte Montmartre)		Léon-Auguste Ottin					
187.	Le Plateau de la Butte		Léon-Auguste Ottin					
188.	La Maison Lorcinier (Butte Montm.)		Léon-Auguste Ottin					
189.	La ru de Mont-Cenis (Butte Montmartre)		Léon-Auguste Ottin					
190.	Retraite de Russi. Versant ouest. (Butte Montmartre)		Léon-Auguste Ottin					
191.	La Maison Rouge, l'Abreuvoir (Butte Montmartre)		Léon-Auguste Ottin					
192.	Petite rue Saint-Denis (Butte Montmartre)		Léon-Auguste Ottin					
193.	La Tour Solferino (Butte Montmartre)		Léon-Auguste Ottin					
194.	Au Cimetière (Butte Montmartre)		Léon-Auguste Ottin					
195.	7 pièces: 1. Le Sommet. Orage; 2. Le Sommet. Brouilard sur Paris; 3. Rue du Mont-Cenis; 4. L'Observatoire à 10 cent.; 5. Village Kabule; 6. D'un Balcon. Soleil couché 7. Entre les rues des Carrieères et Marcadet		Léon-Auguste Ottin					
196.	3 pièces: 1. Le Parc; 2. Auvergne; 3. De la rue Ordener		Léon-Auguste Ottin					
197.	Printemps. Soleil couchant		Camille Pissarro					
198.	Un Etang à Montfoucault (Mayenne)		Camille Pissarro	1874	Oil on canvas	53.5 cm × 65.5 cm (21.1 in × 25.8 in)	Private collection	
199.	Gelée blanche avec brouillard	(No picture on commons))	Camille Pissarro		Oil on canvas	54 cm × 65 cm (21 in × 26 in)	Unknown	
200.	Niege. Coteaux de l'Hermitage (Pontoise)	(No image on commons)	Camille Pissarro	1874	Oil on canvas	54.6 cm × 65.4 cm (21.5 in × 25.7 in)	Private collection	
201.	Ferme à Montfoucault		Camille Pissarro	1874	Oil on canvas	60 cm × 73.5 cm (23.6 in × 28.9 in)	Musée d'Art et d'Histoire, Geneva	
202.	Les Coteaux du Choux		Camille Pissarro	1874	Oil on canvas	54.9 cm × 92.1 cm (21.6 in × 36.3 in)	The Metropolitan Museum of Art, New York	
203.	Le Berger	(No image)	Camille Pissarro		Oil on canvas	60 cm × 73 cm (24 in × 29 in)	Unknown	
204.	Effet de neige à Pontoise		Camille Pissarro					
205.	Effet de Neige. Coteaux d'Osny		Camille Pissarro					
206.	Les Jardins de l'Hermitage		Camille Pissarro					
207.	Paysanne		Camille Pissarro					
208.	Village de l'Hermitage		Camille Pissarro					
209.	Femme et Enfant		Pierre-Auguste Renoir					
210.	Sur la terrasse (Portrait de Madame Chocquet debout)		Pierre-Auguste Renoir	1876	Oil on canvas	67 cm × 54 cm (26 in × 21 in)	Pushkin Museum, Moscow	
211.	Portrait		Pierre-Auguste Renoir					
212.	Etude (Torse de femme au soleil)		Pierre-Auguste Renoir	1876	Oil on canvas	81 cm × 64.8 cm (31.9 in × 25.5 in)	Musée d'Orsay, Paris	
213.	Liseuse (Madame Chocquet lisant)	(Image not on commons)	Pierre-Auguste Renoir		Oil on canvas	65.5 cm × 55 cm (25.8 in × 21.7 in)	Private collection	
214.	Tête d'homme (Portrait de Monsieur Victor Chocquet)		Pierre-Auguste Renoir	1876	Oil on canvas	46 cm × 37 cm (18 in × 15 in)	Am Römerholz, Switzerland	(Note: Two paintings have been suggested as being entry number 214, Tête d'homme. One of these two painting was shown at the Exhibition.)
214.	Tête d'homme (Portrait de Monsieur Victor Chocquet)		Pierre-Auguste Renoir	1876	Oil on canvas	46 cm × 37 cm (18 in × 15 in)	Am Römerholz, Switzerland	
215.	Portrait d'Enfant		Pierre-Auguste Renoir					
216.	Tête d'Enfant		Pierre-Auguste Renoir					
217.	Tête de femme (Buste de femme or Femme à la rose)	(No image on commons)	Pierre-Auguste Renoir		Oil on canvas	33 cm × 27 cm (13 in × 11 in)	Private collection	
218.	Portrait de M^{lle} S...		Pierre-Auguste Renoir					
219.	Femme au piano		Pierre-Auguste Renoir	1875	Oil on canvas	93 cm × 75 cm (37 in × 30 in)	Art Institute of Chicago	
220.	Portrait de M. M. (Potrait de Claude Monet peigmant)		Pierre-Auguste Renoir	1875	Oil on canvas	85 cm × 65.5 cm (33.5 in × 25.8 in)	Musée d'Orsay, Paris	
221.	Déjeûner chsez Fournaise (Le Déjeuner au nord de la rivièra or Rower's Lunch)		Pierre-Auguste Renoir	1875	Oil on canvas	54 cm × 65 cm (21 in × 26 in)	Art Institute of Chicago	
222.	Portrait de M^{me} D...		Pierre-Auguste Renoir					
223.	Portrait de jeune fille		Pierre-Auguste Renoir	1875	Oil on canvas	81.3 cm × 59.6 cm (32.0 in × 23.5 in)	Philadelphia Museum of Art	
224.	Frédéric Bazille, peintre tué à Beaune-la-Rolande		Pierre-Auguste Renoir	1867	Oil on canvas	106 cm × 74 cm (42 in × 29 in)	Musée d'Orsay, Paris	
225.	La Promenade (Mother and Children)		Pierre-Auguste Renoir		Oil on canvas	170.2 cm × 108.3 cm (67.0 in × 42.6 in)	Frick Collection, New York	
226.	Portrait de M° H...		Pierre-Auguste Renoir		Pastel			
HC3.	(Self Portrait)		Pierre-Auguste Renoir	1875	Oil on canvas	39.1 cm × 31.7 cm (15.4 in × 12.5 in)	Clark Art Institute, Williamstown, Massachusetts	
227.	Chemin bordé d'Arbres (Normandie)		Stanislas-Henri Rouart					
228.	Ancien Manoir		Stanislas-Henri Rouart					
229.	Vieille Ferme bretonne (Etude)		Stanislas-Henri Rouart					
230.	Bords de l'Indre		Stanislas-Henri Rouart					
231.	Chemin des Fourneaux		Stanislas-Henri Rouart					
232.	Vue de Melun		Stanislas-Henri Rouart					
233.	Enfants bretons		Stanislas-Henri Rouart					
234.	Manoir de Graddard (Encre de Chine)		Stanislas-Henri Rouart					
235.	Dans un Parc (Sépia)		Stanislas-Henri Rouart					
236.	Chaumières		Stanislas-Henri Rouart					
237.	Effet de neige		Alfred Sisley					
238.	Avenue de l'Abreuvoir. Effet de Givre		Alfred Sisley					
239.	Une Route aux environs de Marly		Alfred Sisley					
240.	L'Abreuvoir de Marly, en hiver		Alfred Sisley	1875	Oil on canvas	49.5 cm × 65.5 cm (19.5 in × 25.8 in)	National Gallery, London	
241.	Le Bord d'un Ruisseau. Environs de Paris		Alfred Sisley					
242.	Le Chemin des Aqueducts (The Aqueduct at Marly)		Alfred Sisley	1874	Oil on canvas	54.3 cm × 81.3 cm (21.4 in × 32.0 in)	Toledo Museum of Art	(Note: Two paintings have been suggested as being entry number 242, Le Chemin des aqueducts. One of these two painting was shown at the Exhibition.)
242.	Le Chemin des Aqueducts (Au pied de l'aqueduc de Louveciennes)		Alfred Sisley	1876	Oil on canvas	46.5 cm × 55.5 cm (18.3 in × 21.9 in)	Am Römerholz, Switzerland	
243.	Route de Saint-Germain		Alfred Sisley					
244.	Inondations à Port-Marly		Alfred Sisley	1876	Oil on canvas	60 cm × 81 cm (24 in × 32 in)	Musée d'Orsay, Paris	
HC4.	Maisonsur les bords de la Marne		Alfred Sisley					
245.	Le Chaos de Villers		Charles Tillot					
246.	Vue prise des hauteurs du Chaos, à Villers		Charles Tillot					
247.	Falaises, à Villers		Charles Tillot					
248.	Falaises à Marée basse		Charles Tillot					
249.	Manoir de Graffard		Charles Tillot					
250.	Rochers et Plage à Villers		Charles Tillot					
251.	Plaine de Barbison		Charles Tillot					
252.	Intérieur du Bas-Bréau		Charles Tillot					

== Bibliography ==
- Berson, Ruth (1996). The New Painting: Impressionism 1874-1886: Documentation. San Francisco: Fine Arts Museums of San Francisco. ISBN 0-295-96704-8.
- Moffett, Charles S. (1986). The New Painting: Impressionism 1874-1886. San Francisco: Fine Arts Museums of San Francisco. ISBN 0-88401-047-3.
- Rewald, John (1973). The History of Impressionism (Fourth ed.). New York: Museum of Modern Art. ISBN 0-87070-360-6.
