= La Grenouillère =

La Grenouillère may refer to:

- La Grenouillère (Monet)
- La Grenouillère (Renoir)
