= The Aqueduct at Marly =

1874 painting by Alfred Sisley

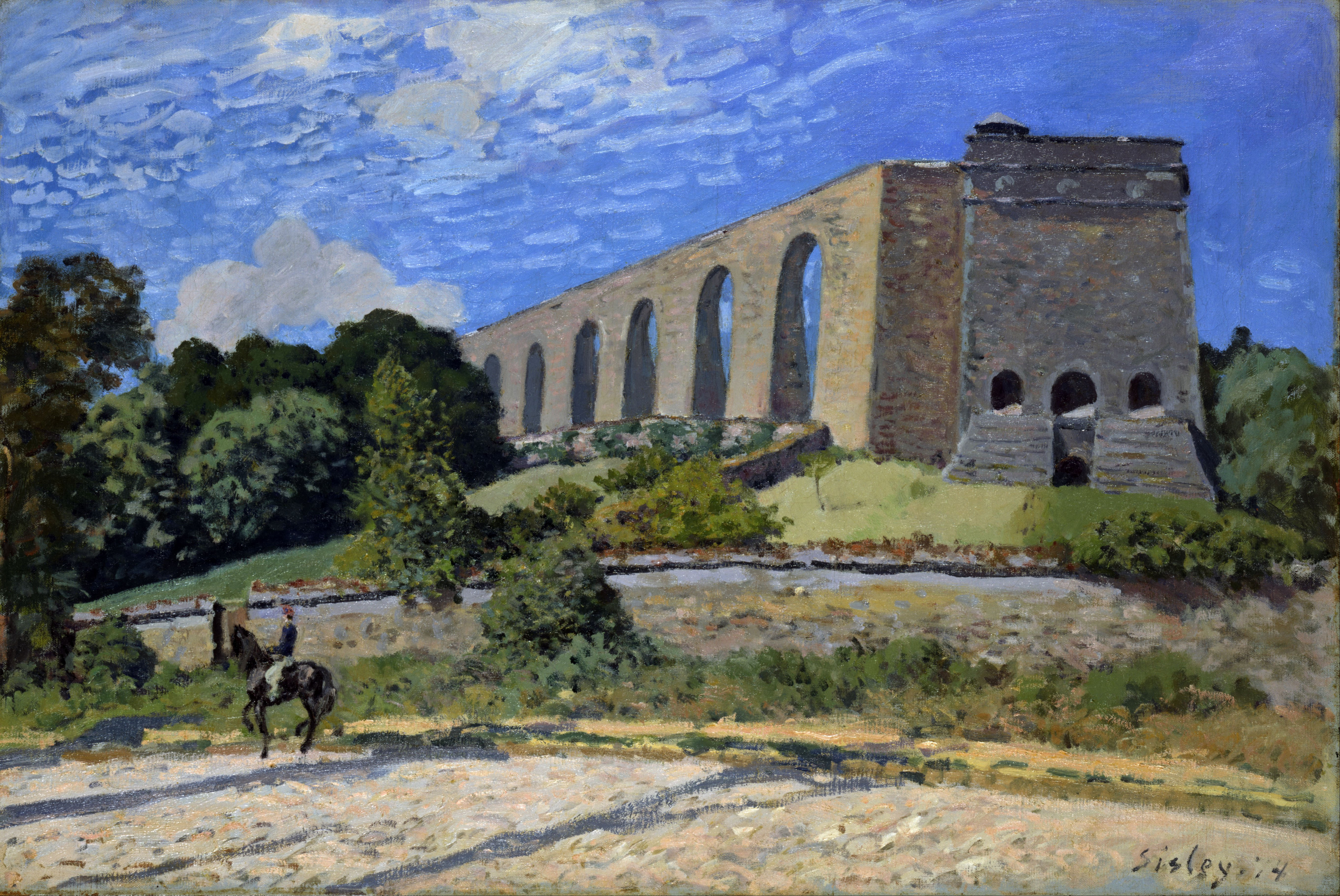
- Artist: Alfred Sisley
- Year: 1874
- Medium: Oil on canvas
- Dimensions: 54.3 cm × 81.3 cm (21.4 in × 32.0 in)
- Location: Toledo Museum of Art, Toledo, Ohio

The Aqueduct at Marly or The Aqueduct at Louveciennes is an 1874 painting by Alfred Sisley. It was bought from the artist by Paul Durand-Ruel in 1876 before being acquired by Edward Libbey, who in turn donated it to the Toledo Museum of Art, where it now hangs. It shows the Aqueduc de Louveciennes. A lifesize reproduction of it is sited at the site of its creation as part of the Pays des Impressionnistes scheme.

== Production ==
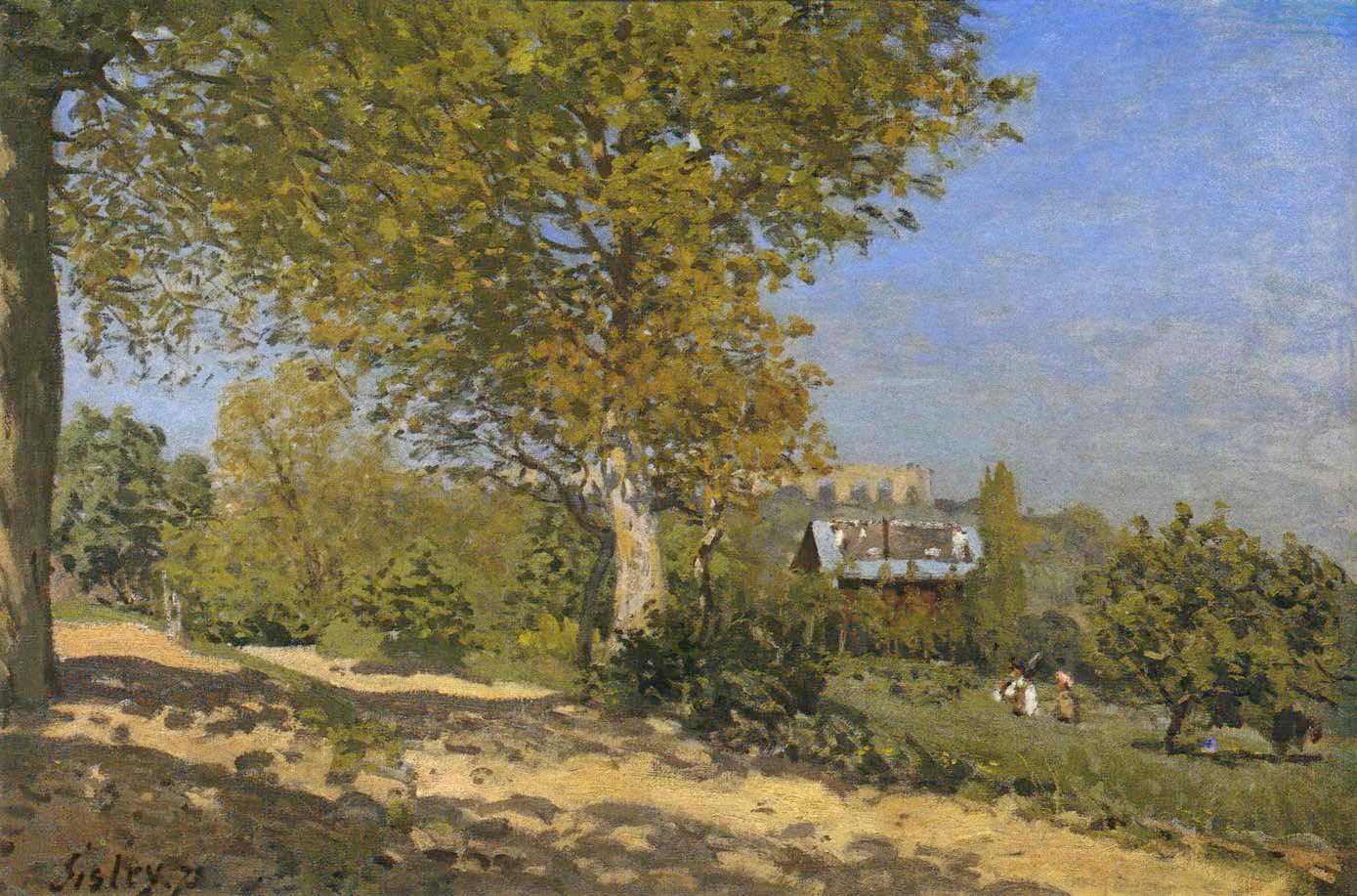
Near Louveciennes, 1872, by Sisley

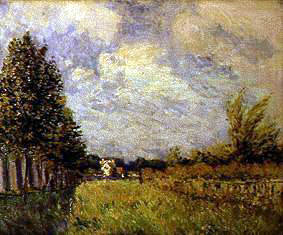
The Chemin des aqueducs by Sisley

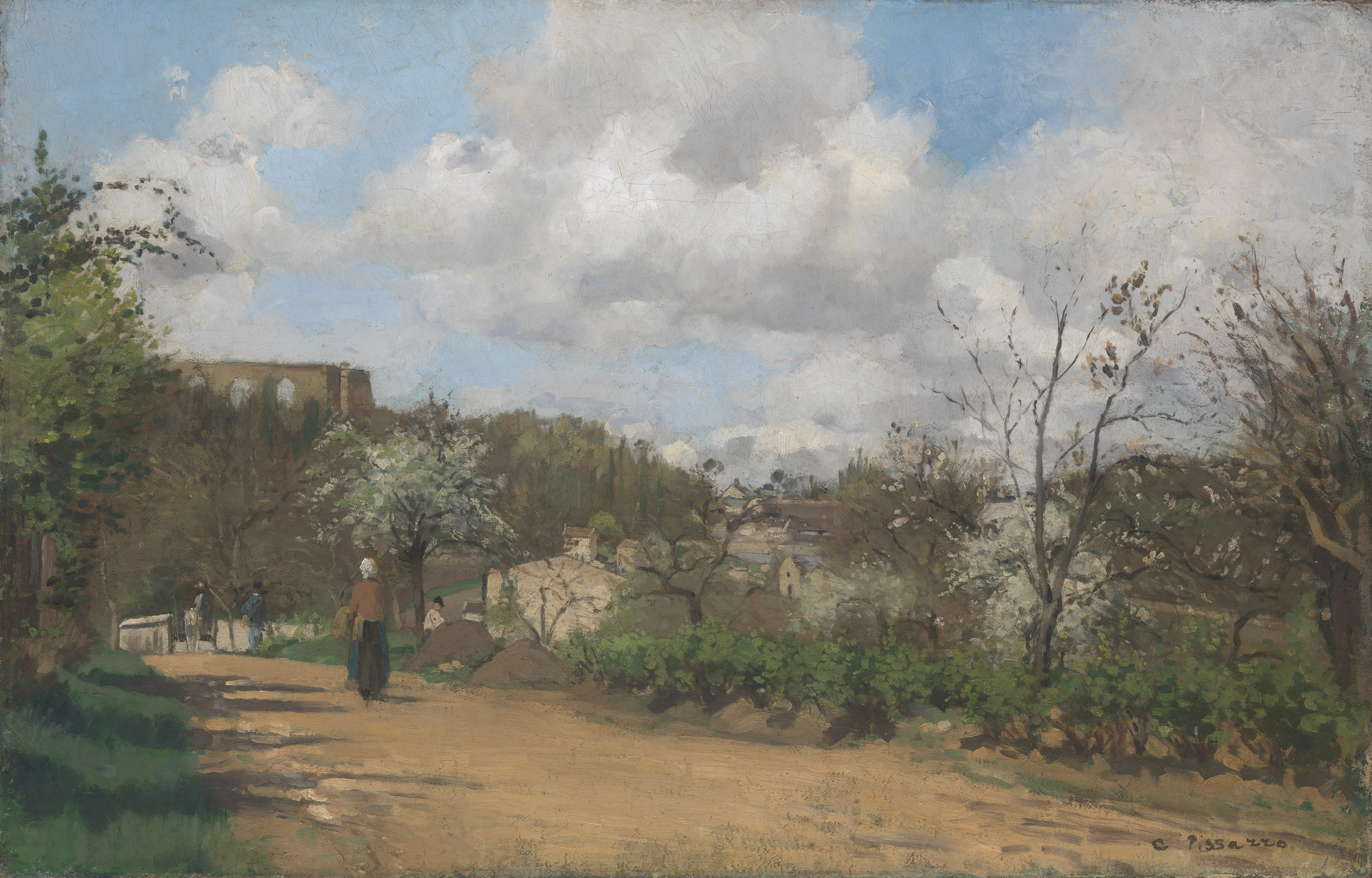
Vue de Louveciennes by Camille Pissarro, 1870, National Gallery, London.

British by birth, Sisley was unable to fight in the Franco-Prussian War and - fleeing the Siege of Paris - he first stayed at Louveciennes in autumn 1870, at which time he painted First Snow at Louveciennes (Boston Museum of Fine Arts), showing rue de Voisins, near Renoir's mother's house in the hamlet where he had set up his studio. He also produced a series of paintings showing the peak of the side of the Cœur-Volant. In spring 1871, with Paris in the control of the Commune, Sisley again took refuge in Louveciennes, this time at 2 rue de La Princesse. He found his studio ransacked by the Prussian troops, meaning few paintings of Louveciennes from before 1871 survive. He remained in the town until winter 1874-1875, painting several snowy landscapes with pink, yellow or blue tints.

Built in the 17th century, the aqueduct had stopped working in 1866 and during the war the Prussians had installed an artillery battery on the tour du Levant at the east end of the aqueduct (on the right hand side of this work). In Renoir, Monet and Pissarro's first paintings, the aqueduct is shown bridging the gap between two hills as a reminder of the region's royal pastn. Sisley painted it from three different angles (D. 49, D. 133 et D. 213). The first of the three (D.49) was painted in 1872, closely following the style of Spring in Louveciennes (1868-1869, National Gallery, London) by Camille Pissarro and of Henri Bevan's 1870 photograph The Aqueduct at Louveciennes.

== Provenance ==
- Bought by Paul Durand-Ruel from Sisley in 1876
- Alex Reid and Lefevre, London
- Edward Drummond Libbey; USA
- Donated to the Toledo Art Museum

== See also ==
- List of paintings by Alfred Sisley
