= Édouard Béliard =

French painter

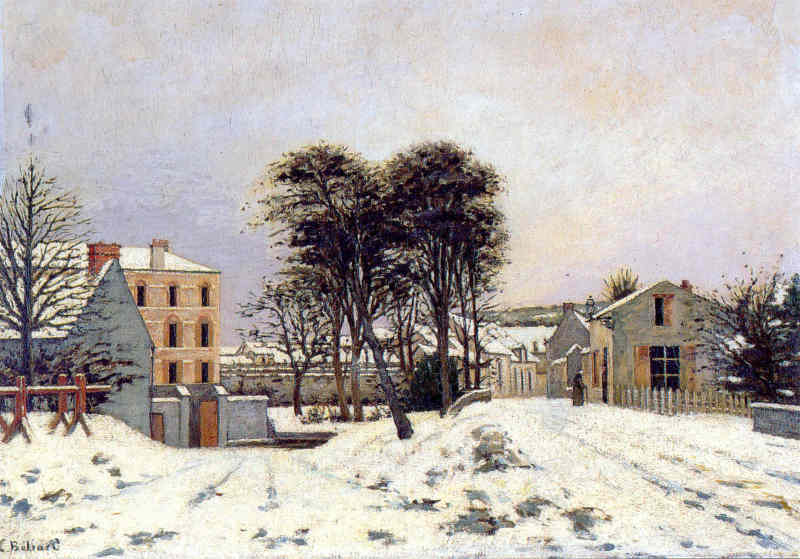
The Mill of Chauffour (1878)

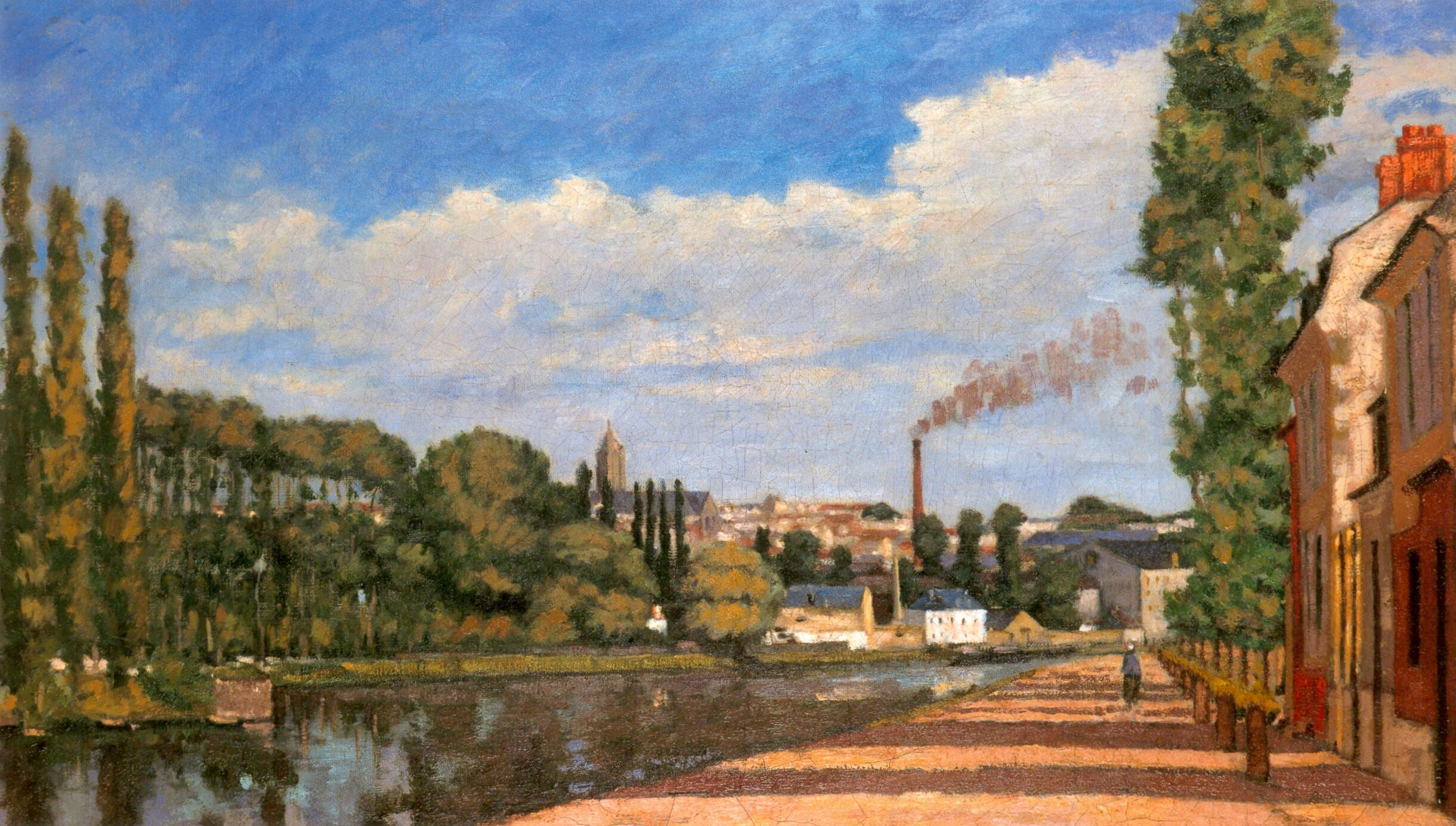
Pontoise; View from the Locks (1874)

Edmond-Joseph Béliard, known as Édouard (24 November 1832, Paris – 28 November 1912, Étampes) was a French Impressionist painter.

== Life and work ==
He was born in Paris as the son of an architect, and began his professional career as a legal assistant and secretary to Alphonse Esquiros. Later, he took painting lessons with Léon Cogniet and Ernest Hébert, where he came under the influence of Jean-Baptiste Corot. After spending some time in Rome, he had his first exhibit at the Salon of 1867, and lived in London from 1870 to 1872.

After his return to Paris, he became associated with the group of young Impressionists who gathered around Edgar Degas and became a close friend of Camille Pissarro, who he met at the Café Guerbois. It was there that he made the acquaintance of Émile Zola and may have provided some inspiration for one of Zola's recurring characters; the painter Gagnière.

In 1874, he helped prepare for the First Impressionist Exhibition, where he held a retrospective of his works. He also participated in the Second Impressionist Exhibition, focusing on landscapes but, as the years progressed, he turned away from pure Impressionism and introduced more elements of Realism into his work.

He spent his last years in the commune of Étampes, where he served as mayor from 1892 to 1900. A street there is named after him.
