= The Ballet Class (Degas, Musée d'Orsay) =

Painting by Edgar Degas

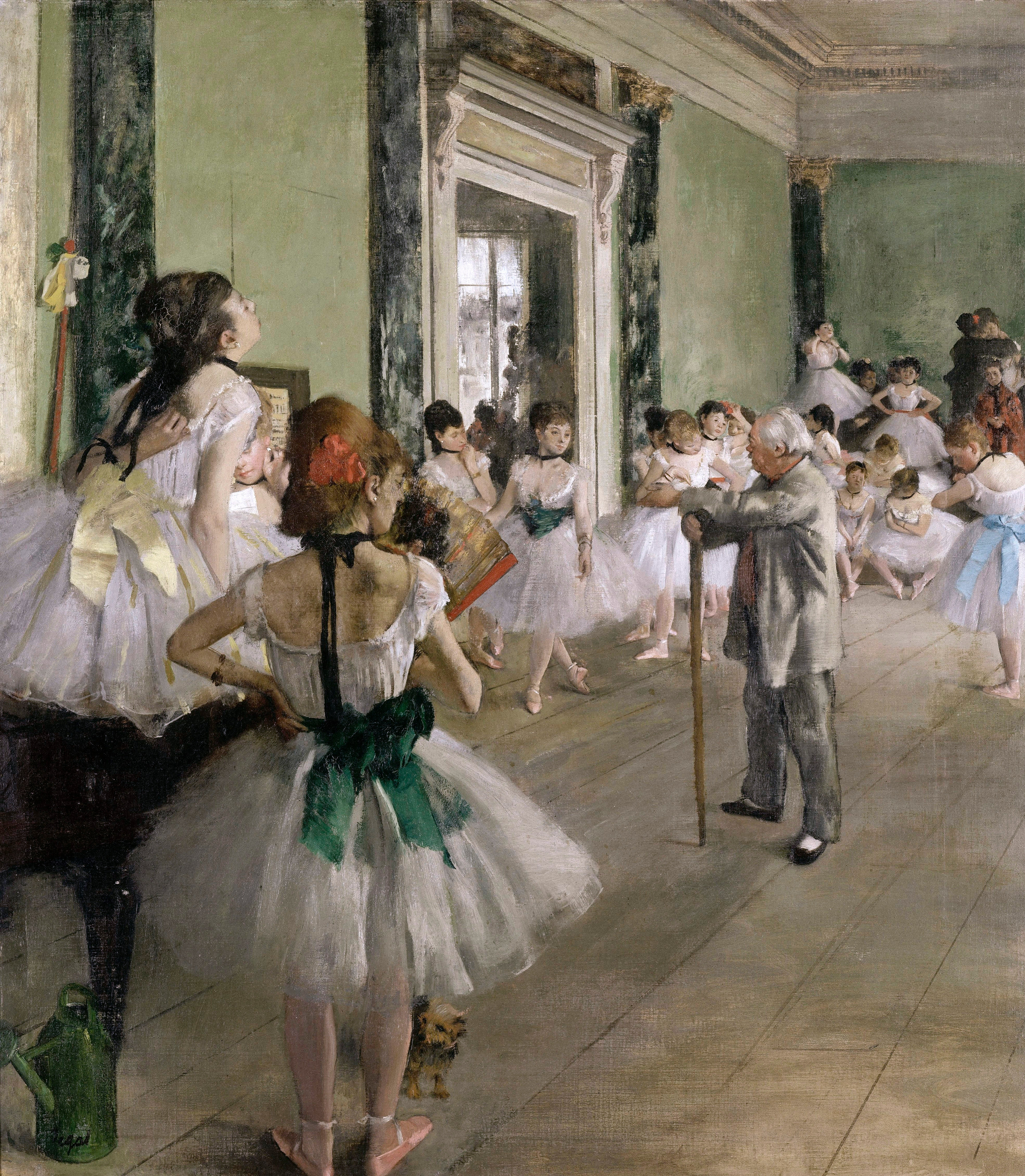
- Artist: Edgar Degas
- Year: c. 1874-1876
- Medium: Oil paint on canvas
- Dimensions: 85 by 75 centimetres (33 in × 30 in)
- Location: Musée d'Orsay, Paris

The Ballet Class (French: La Classe de danse) is an oil painting on canvas created between 1874 and 1876 by the French artist Edgar Degas. The painting depicts a group of ballet dancers at the end of a lesson, led by ballet master Jules Perrot. Known for portraying dancers, Degas captured the grace and the rigorous nature of ballet as a profession. The Ballet Class is housed in the Musée d'Orsay, Paris, France. It was commissioned by the composer Jean-Baptiste Faure. The Ballet Class closely resembles The Dance Class, also painted by Degas in 1874.

== Subject matter ==
The Ballet Class depicts a silver-haired teacher, Jules Perrot, at the center giving private lessons to young dancers in the Hôtel de Choiseul. According to the American art critic Richard Mühlberger, Perrot's critical expression suggests the Realism and lifelike quality of the artwork. Perrot, the teacher, is staring at the dancing ballerina in the center of the composition. Perrot is also gesturing to a ballerina behind him.

The dancers are arranged in a loose, connected line around the room and the teacher. Some of the dancers are sitting and others are standing. Some dancers watch the star pupil dance while others talk to one another or play with their dresses. The dancers' bare backs, chests, arms, legs, shoulder blades, and exposed cleavage all emphasize nudity. According to Carol Armstrong, an American art historian, the black neckbands the dancers wear highlight the whiteness and "nakedness" of the dancers.

Additional details include the “stage mothers” watching over their children from the back wall, a can of water for dampening the dust on the floor, a little dog, and a girl sitting on the left, stretching her back. Lillian Schacherl claims that all of these details suggest that this painting was carefully calculated and created in Degas's studio based on preliminary sketches.

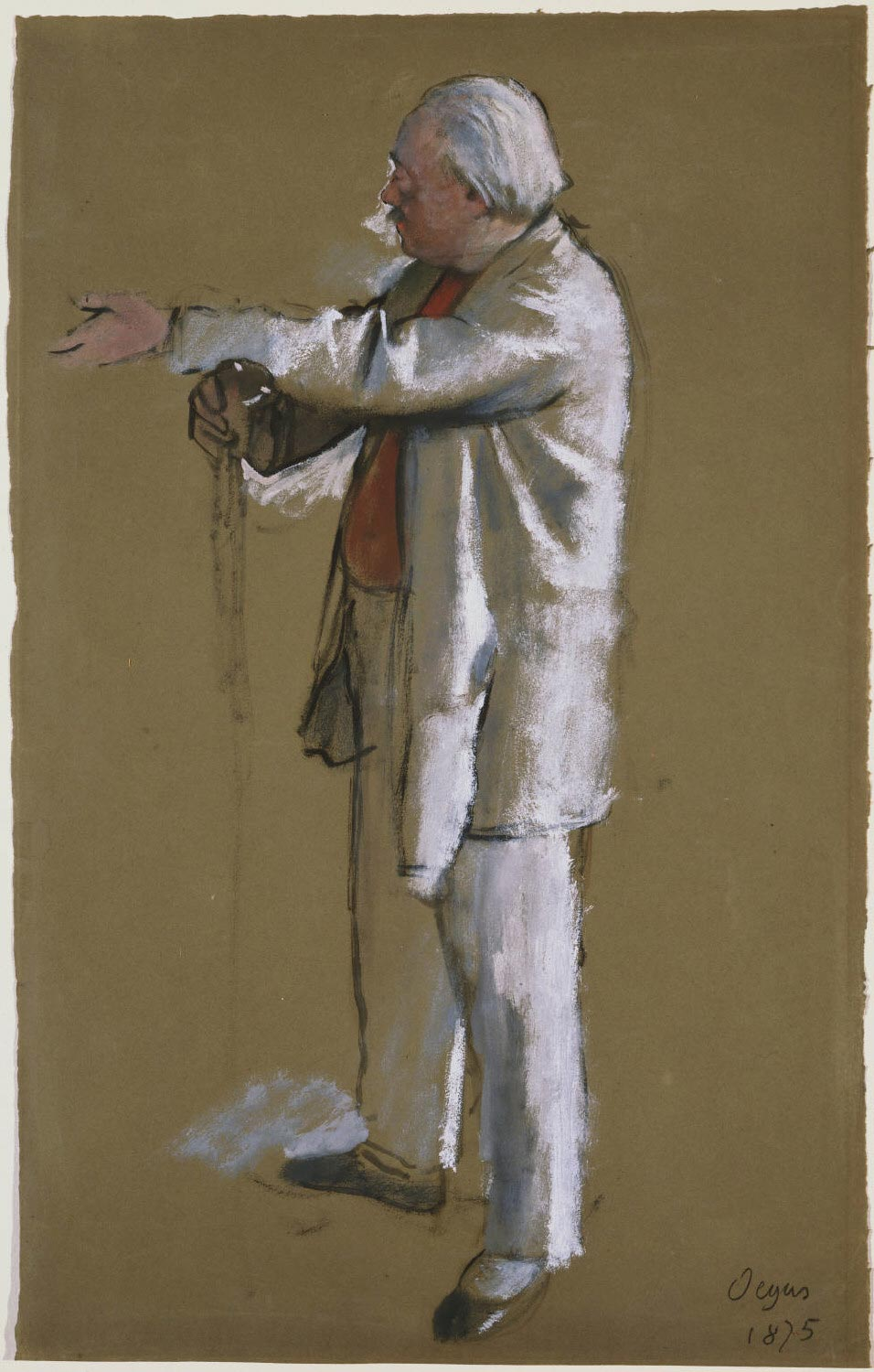
Edgar Degas portrait of Jules Perrot.

== Time period ==
Degas turned to ballet painting at a time when the status of ballet was in flux at the Paris Opéra. The era of romantic ballet lasted from the 1820s to the late 1860s, just before this painting was created. The only people who remained from that era were the "ballet masters" Louis Mérante and Jules Perrot. During this era, there were not many famous ballet dancers, so often the names of the girls Degas painted were not recorded.

== Process and technique ==
Jill DeVonyar and Richard Kendall suggest that The Ballet Class painting was well underway before Jules Perrot was introduced as the focus. Perrot was painted over another male teacher, thought to be Louis Merante. Perrot did not mind posing for Degas to capture his outfit, posture, and appearance as well as the shadow and light on his clothing. The velvety texture of Perrot's flannel suit and the precise red reflections on his face suggest the careful attention that Degas devoted to his subject during modeling sessions.

Degas would take artistic liberties with his subjects, sometimes embellishing the costume and setting. Instead of focusing on a perfect performance, Degas tended toward Realism, providing intimate views into the lives of ballet dancers during rehearsal. He painted the dancers from observation, painting them as looking bored or exhausted, highlighting the difficult profession of dancing, but he also adjusted the poses of the figures based on his imagination.

He used oils and built up layers of pigment on the canvas. Oil and charcoal sketches of the girl scratching her back can be traced to earlier works, while the figure of Perrot specifically dates back to drawings from 1872. In the location of the painting where one girl holds a fan, there was originally a girl adjusting her slipper, but Degas painted over her.

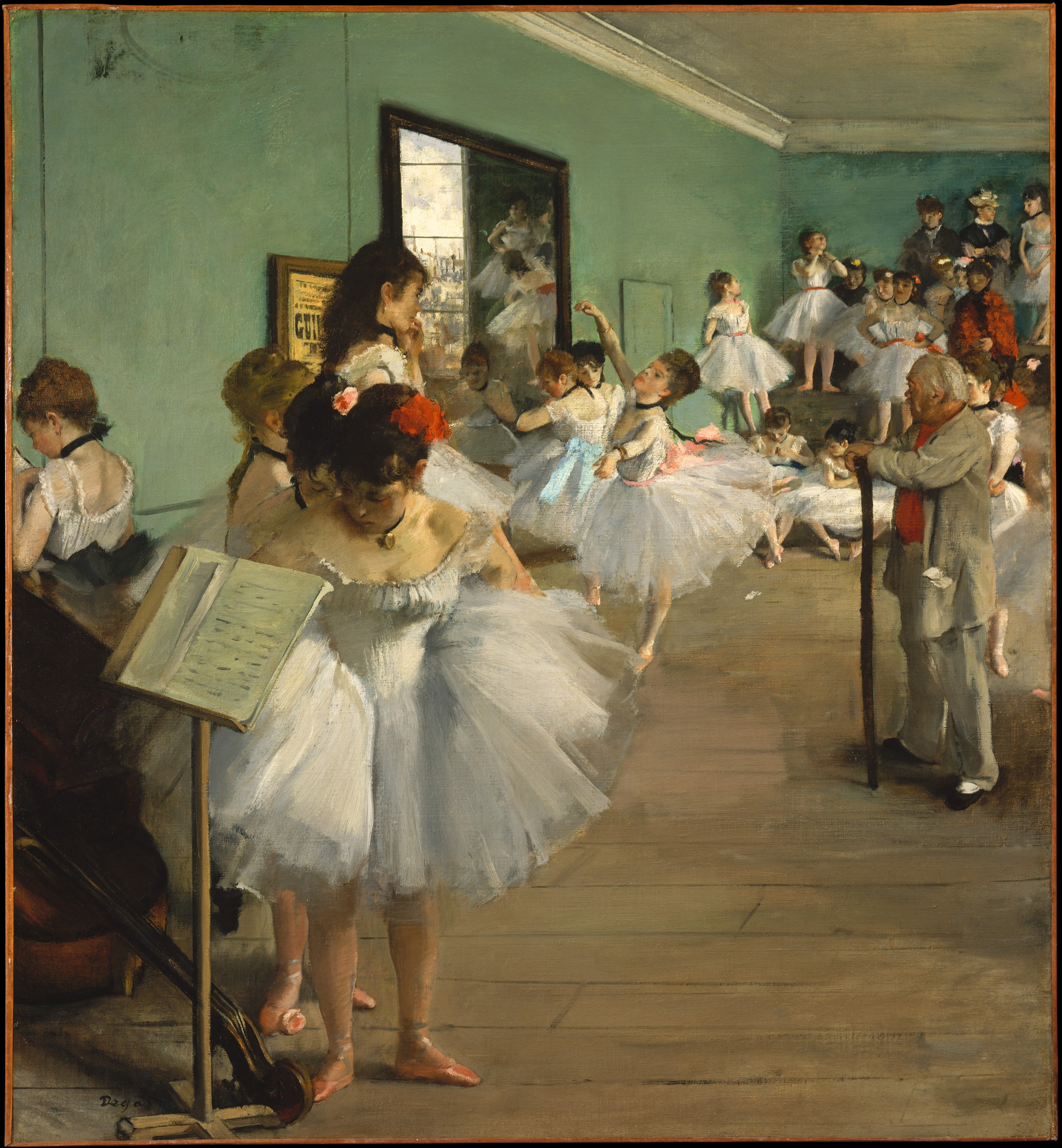
Edgar Degas, The Dance Class

Degas often explored a single theme across many works. The Ballet Class was one of three major paintings centering on Jules Perrot between 1873 and 1876. Perrot was often shown in the same way: giving private lessons in the Hôtel de Choiseul.

== Edgar Degas: painter of ballet dancers ==
Degas painted the first ballet scene in 1866, and he went on to paint an estimated 1,500 works on the subject. According to the writer Susan Meyer, Degas felt sympathy for dancers who had to repeat and repeat until they reached absolute perfection. He was curious about movement, music, French society, and the costumes of ballerinas. He would make notes of exactly how the ribbon was tied or how the skirt was falling from the body. He preferred the rehearsal studio, not the actual finalized performances because he liked the little events that occurred in the background.

Degas was fascinated with dancers on stage and behind the scenes, seeing the contrast between these spaces as a way to distinguish between real and artificial experiences. He tended to focus on the female body in motion, and he was among the first artists at the time to study dancers in motion. Degas devoted great time to the representation of women throughout his career; three quarters of his works are images of women in some form, representing them with a high degree of realism.

== Jules Perrot ==
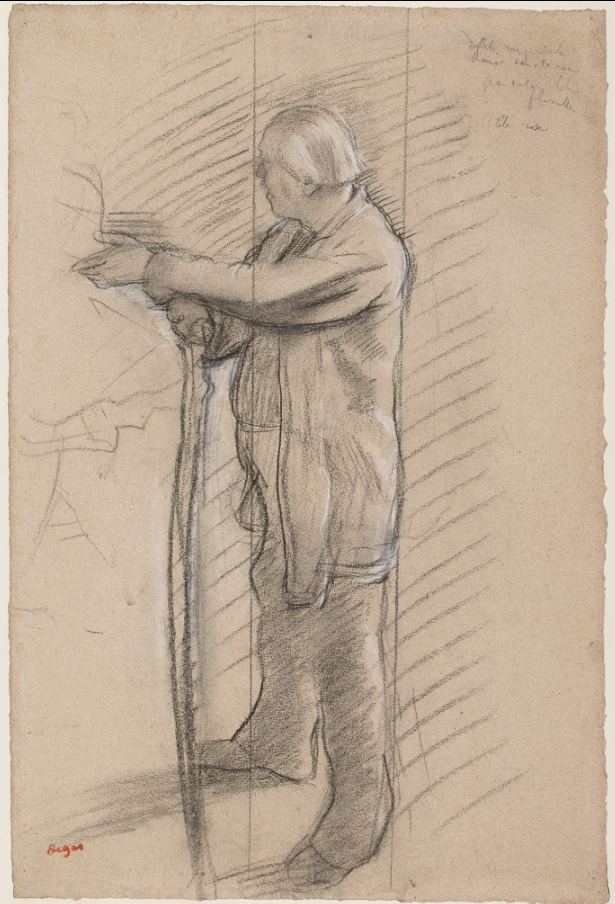
Edgar Degas portrait of Jules Perrot.

The relationship between Degas and Jules Perrot is unknown. Perrot was a leading figure in ballet in Russia and France in the 1830s and 1840s. He was known as a legendary dancer and choreographer during the Golden Age of Romantic ballet. However, before Degas created this work, Perrot's contract was not renewed at the Paris Opéra, and Degas’s work has sometimes been interpreted as a means of reasserting Perrot's authority. He was around sixty-four years old when this was painted.

In the last phase of his career, Perrot privately coached principal ballerinas as depicted in The Ballet Class.

== Date uncertain ==
Degas did not record dates on his paintings between 1872 and 1876. Paul André Lemoisne had dated this work to 1876, but the art historian Ronald Pickvance believes that 1874-1875 is more accurate based on comparisons with other works by Degas from the period.
