= Place du Chenil in Marly, Snow Effect =

1876 painting by Alfred Sisley

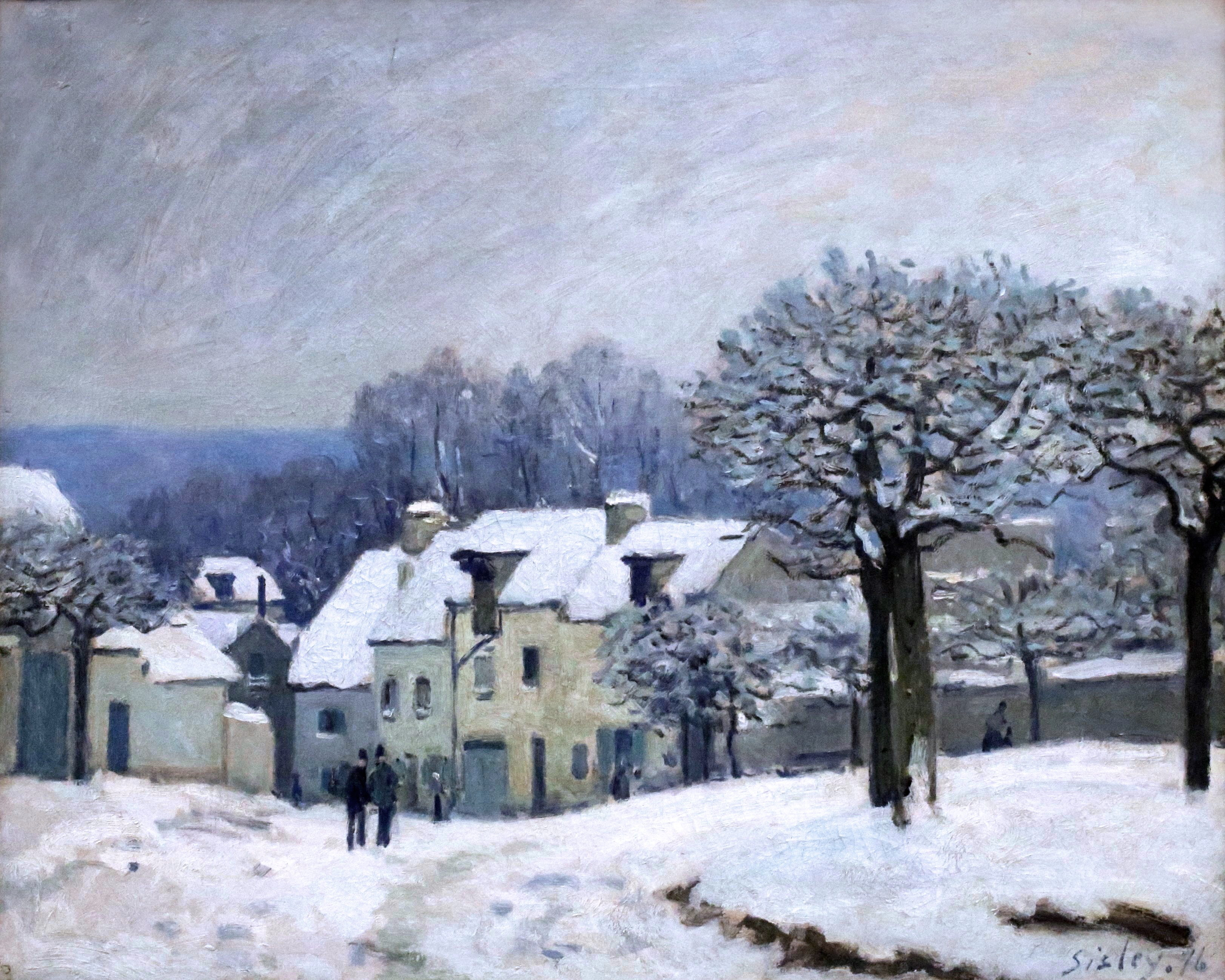
- Artist: Alfred Sisley
- Year: 1876
- Medium: oil on canvas
- Dimensions: 50 cm × 61.5 cm (20 in × 24.2 in)
- Location: Musée des Beaux-Arts de Rouen; Rouen. Normandy

Place du Chenil in Marly, Snow Effect is an 1876 oil on canvas painting by Alfred Sisley. It is now in the Musée des beaux-arts de Rouen, to which it was given by François Depeaux in 1909 It was painted at Marly-le-Roi and a lifesize reproduction of it is on display near the site of its creation as part of the Pays des Impressionnistes trail.

== History ==
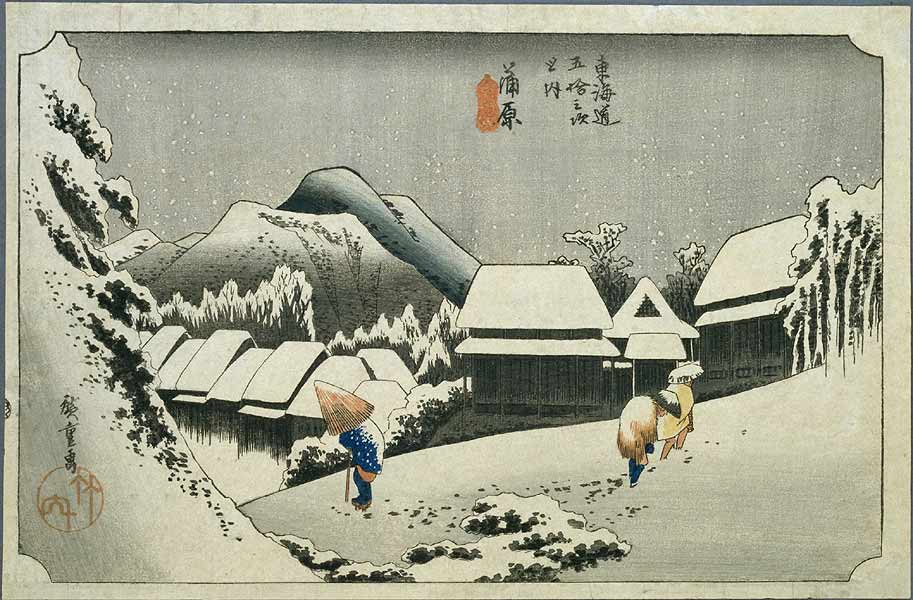
Utagawa Hiroshige, 16th view, 15th state, The Fifty-three Stations of the Tōkaidō - Snowy Night at Kambara

Sisley had moved to Marly in 1875. The winters of 1875–1876 were exceptionally cold, with temperatures below zero and frequent snow. Sisley painted several snowy views of Marly and nearby Louveciennes. Unlike Auguste Renoir, who called snow "nature's leprosy", Sisley enjoyed painting snowy scenes Several of his works also show Japanese influence, in the case of this work particularly Snowy Night at Kambara by Hiroshige.

== See also ==
- List of paintings by Alfred Sisley
