= The Dance Class (Degas, Metropolitan Museum of Art) =

Painting by Edgar Degas

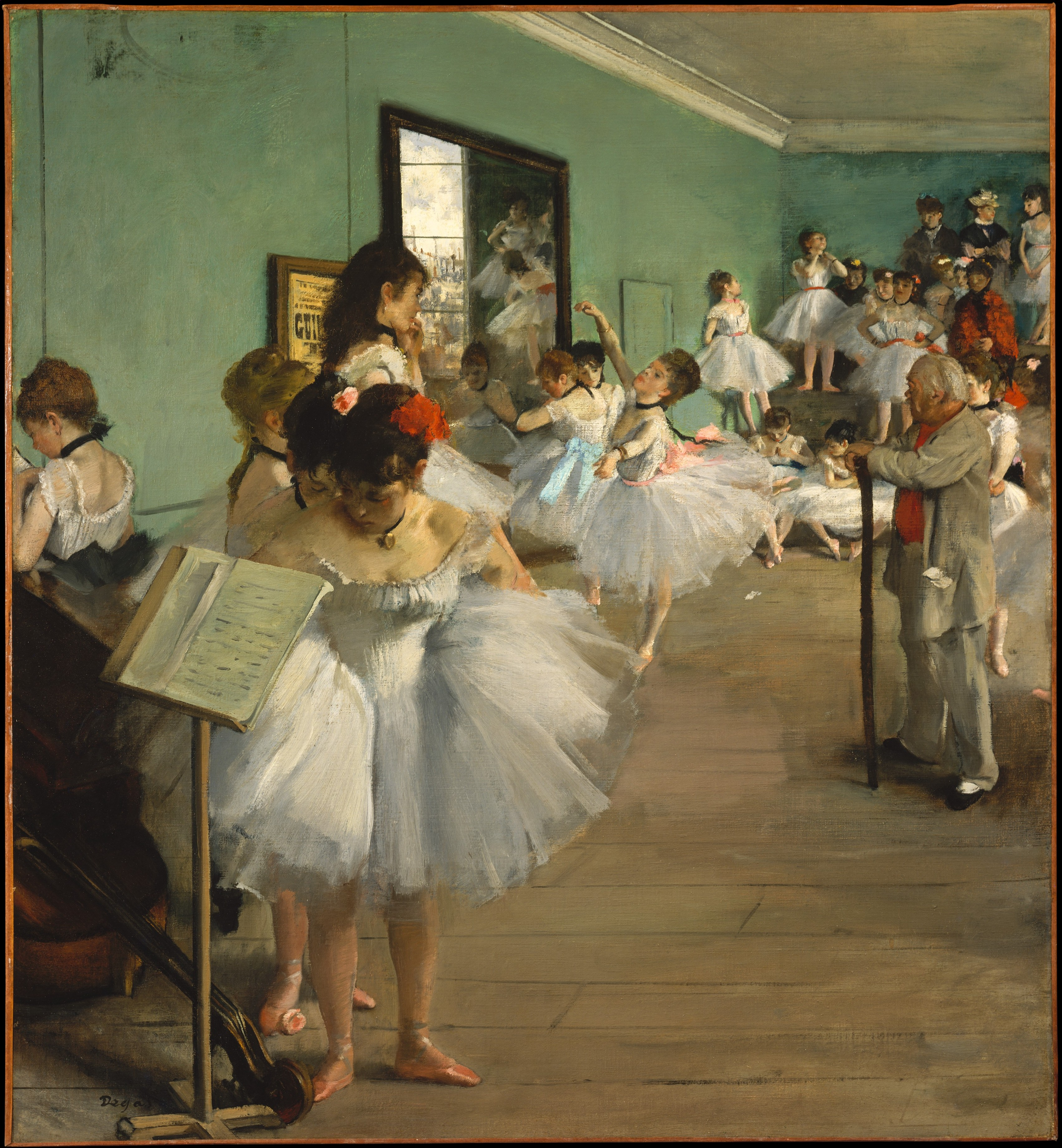
- Artist: Edgar Degas
- Year: 1874
- Type: Oil paint on canvas
- Dimensions: 83.5 by 77.2 centimetres (32.9 in × 30.4 in)
- Location: Metropolitan Museum of Art, New York
- Accession: 1987.47.1

The Dance Class is an oil painting on canvas by the French artist Edgar Degas, from 1874. It is in the collection of the Metropolitan Museum of Art, in New York.

The painting and its companion work in the Musée d'Orsay, Paris, are amongst the most ambitious works by Degas on the theme of ballet. The imaginary scene depicts a dance class being held under the supervision of Jules Perrot, a famous ballet master, in the old Paris Opera, which had actually burnt down the previous year. The poster on the wall for Rossini's Guillaume Tell is a tribute to the operatic singer Jean-Baptiste Faure, who had commissioned the work.

The painting is on view in the Metropolitan Museum's Gallery 815 as of December 2023.
