= Charles Tillot =

French painter, collector, art critic and writer

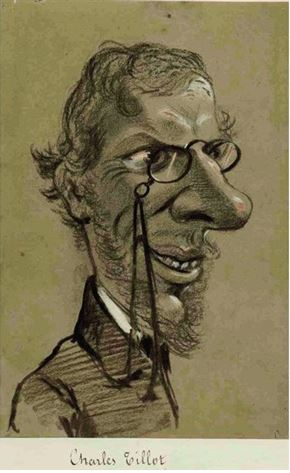
Charles Tillot; caricature by Nadar

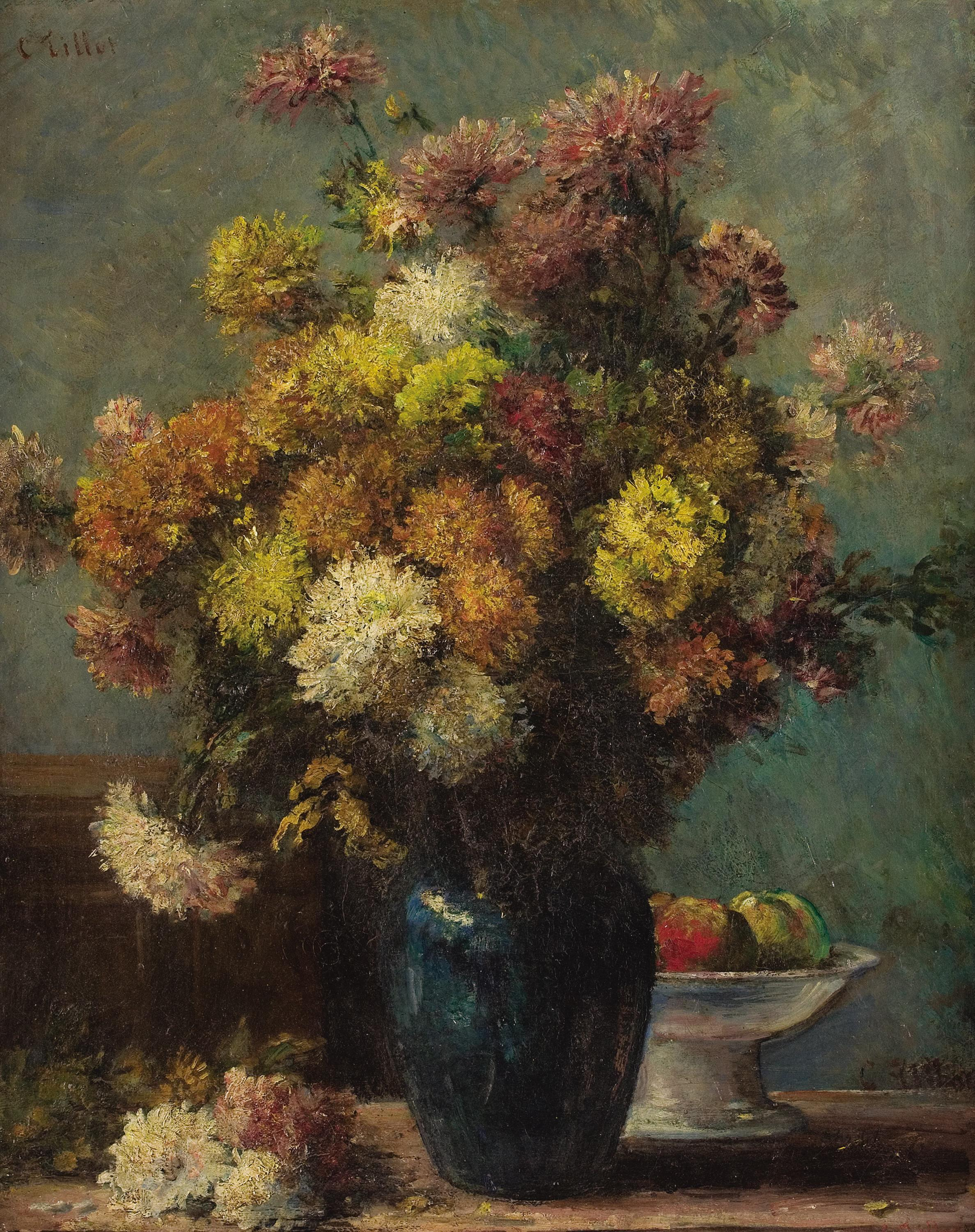
Flowers in a Blue Vase

Charles-Victor Tillot (9 April 1825, Rouen – 1895, Rouen) was a French flower painter, collector, art critic and writer. He was associated with the Impressionists and the Barbizon School.

== Biography ==
His father, Claude, was a journalist. He arrived in Paris in 1839; studying art with Hendrik Scheffer and Théodore Rousseau. Later, after buying a house in Barbizon, he worked with Jean-François Millet, who was his next-door neighbor. He also shared Millet's interest in Ukiyo-e (Japanese prints) and collected them at his Paris apartment. He and his wife would become the godparents for Millet's daughter Anne-Marie and care for him when he entered his final illness. After his death, Charles wrote the catalogue for the sale of his paintings at the Hôtel Drouot.

His first exhibit at the Salon came in 1846, where he presented a "Portrait of the Author" (Self-portrait?). In 1849, he exhibited a "Souvenir of the Pyrenees" and, in 1855, a "Forest Interior". He was a friend of Edgar Degas, who was a neighbor of his in Paris, and frequented the meetings of his friends; including Mary Cassatt, Albert Bartholomé and François Antoine Léon Fleury

He also provided art criticism and commentary for the journal Le Siècle, where his father was Managing Director. His writing impressed Charles Baudelaire, who asked to be introduced to him. In addition to writing, his journalistic activities included photography and, after 1871, he was listed as a member of the Société française de photographie.

In 1876, he took part in the Deuxième exposition des impressionnistes at the Durand-Ruel Gallery. He apparently exhibited flower paintings and landscapes, although no official record seems to exist. Despite this, some works are listed by Sophie Monneret in her monumental work on Impressionsim. He continued to participate in their exhibitions until the 8th in 1886, except for the 7th, which he boycotted to protest the exclusion of Jean-François Raffaëlli.

He apparently became reclusive in his later life. With the exception of a series of photographs, showing the Vues instantanées et paysages en 1880 (now at the Musée d'Orsay), much of his work has disappeared from museums. Given the number of exhibitions in which he participated, he was, in fact, fairly prolific. In the opinion of art critic Gérald Schurr, many of his paintings have been re-signed as the work of Gustave Courbet, although this opinion is not generally shared. Curiously, some sources give the year of his death as 1877, which is the year Courbet died.
