= Flooding at Port-Marly =

1872 painting by Alfred Sisley

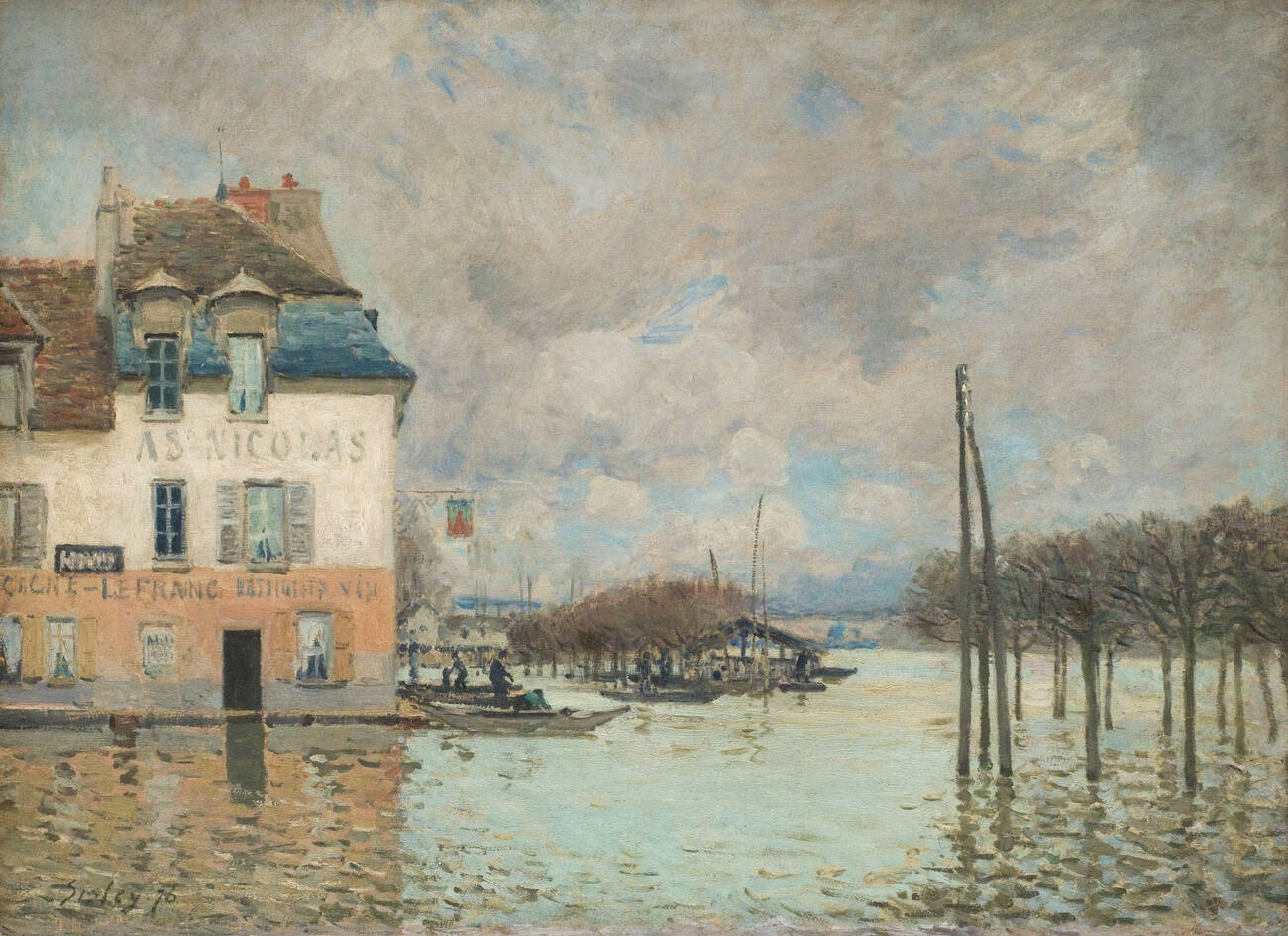
The Paris version.

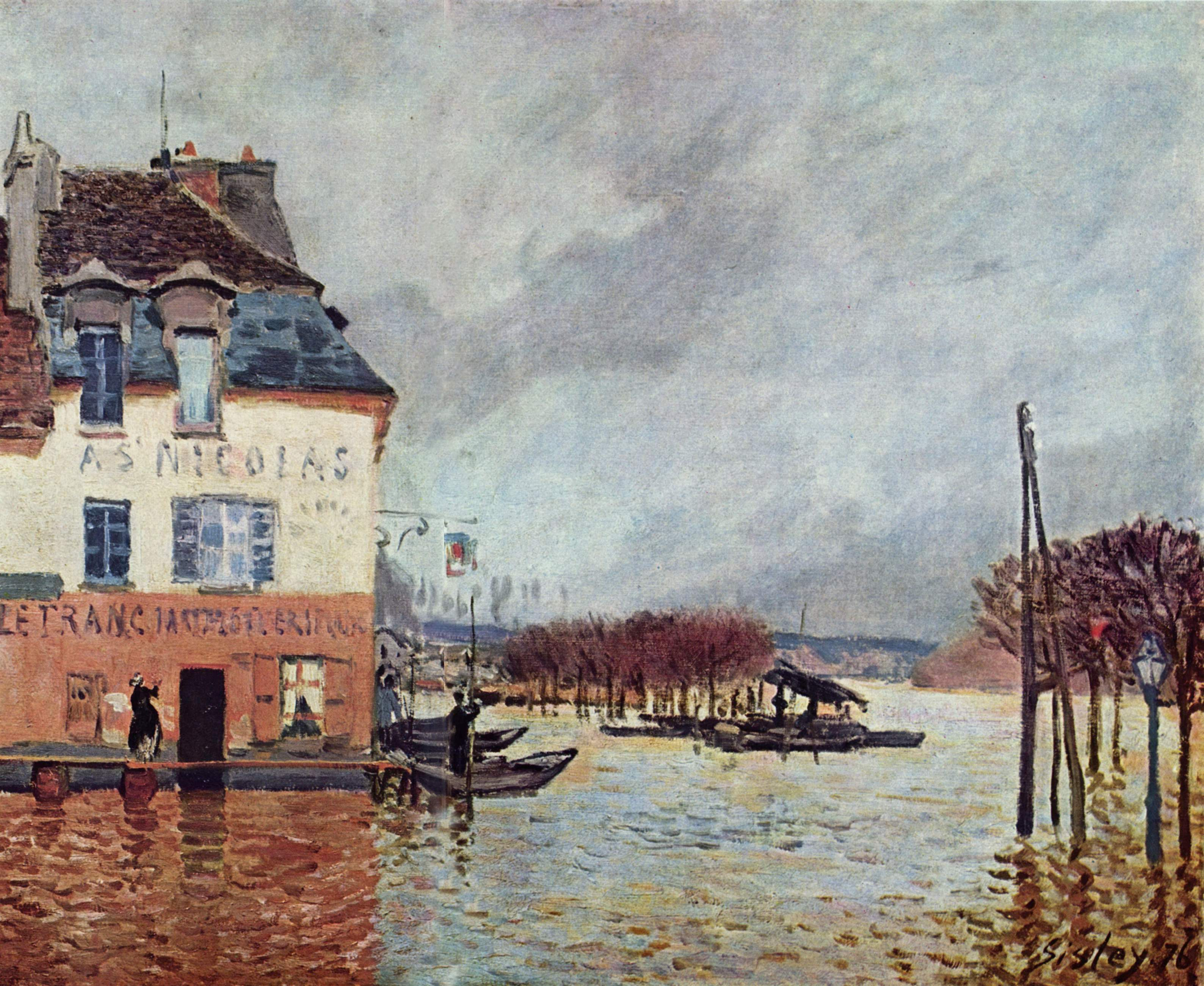
The Rouen version.

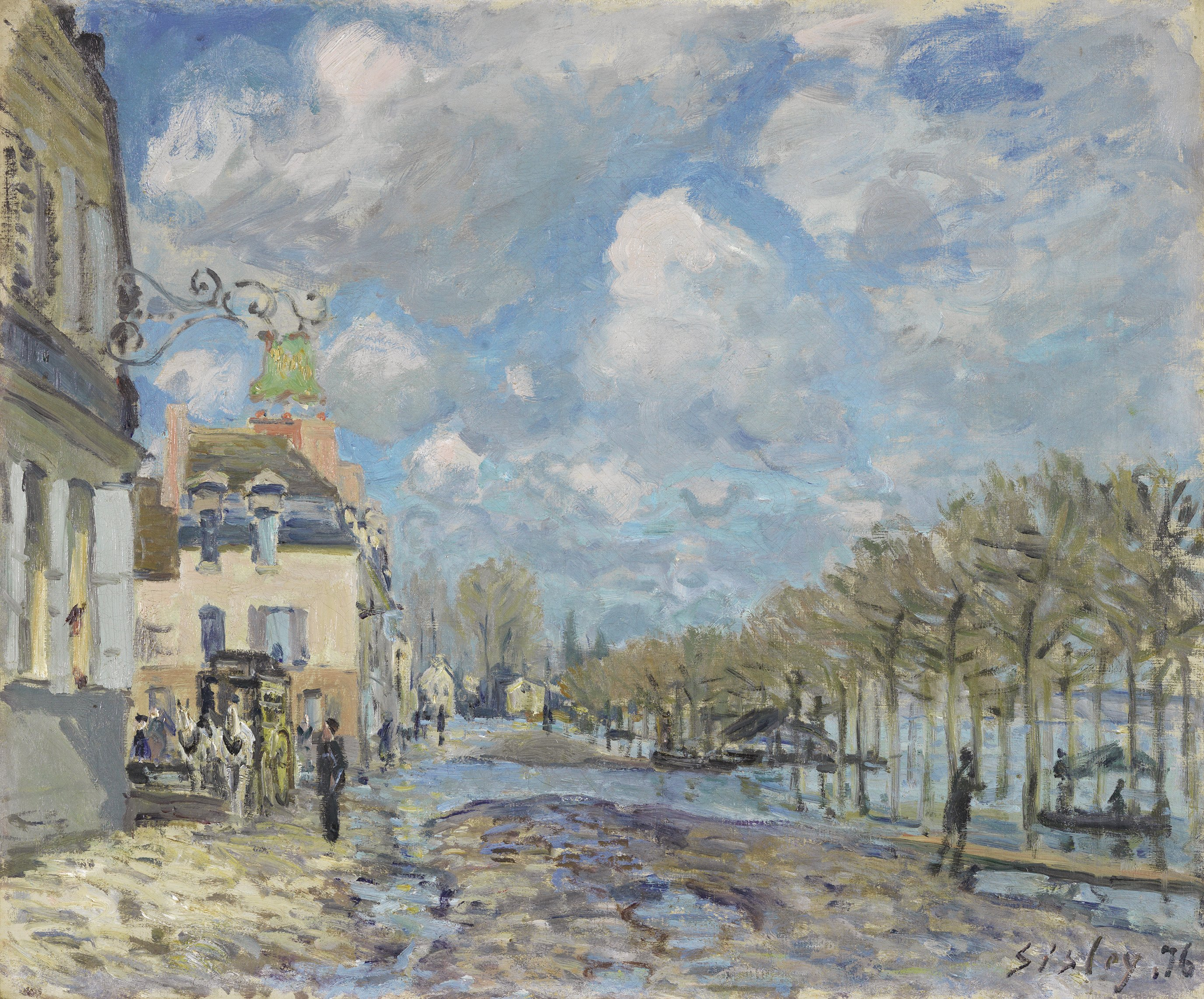
The Madrid version.

Flooding at Port-Marly is the title of two series of paintings by Alfred Sisley, produced at Port-Marly in 1872 (seven works) and 1876 (four works). Two works from the 1876 series are now in the Musée d'Orsay, with one hanging in the museum itself and the other at the Musée des Beaux-Arts de Rouen. Other work from the 1876 series is exhibited in the Thyssen-Bornemisza Museum, Madrid.

== See also ==
- List of paintings by Alfred Sisley
