= La Grenouillère (Renoir) =

1869 painting by Pierre-Auguste Renoir

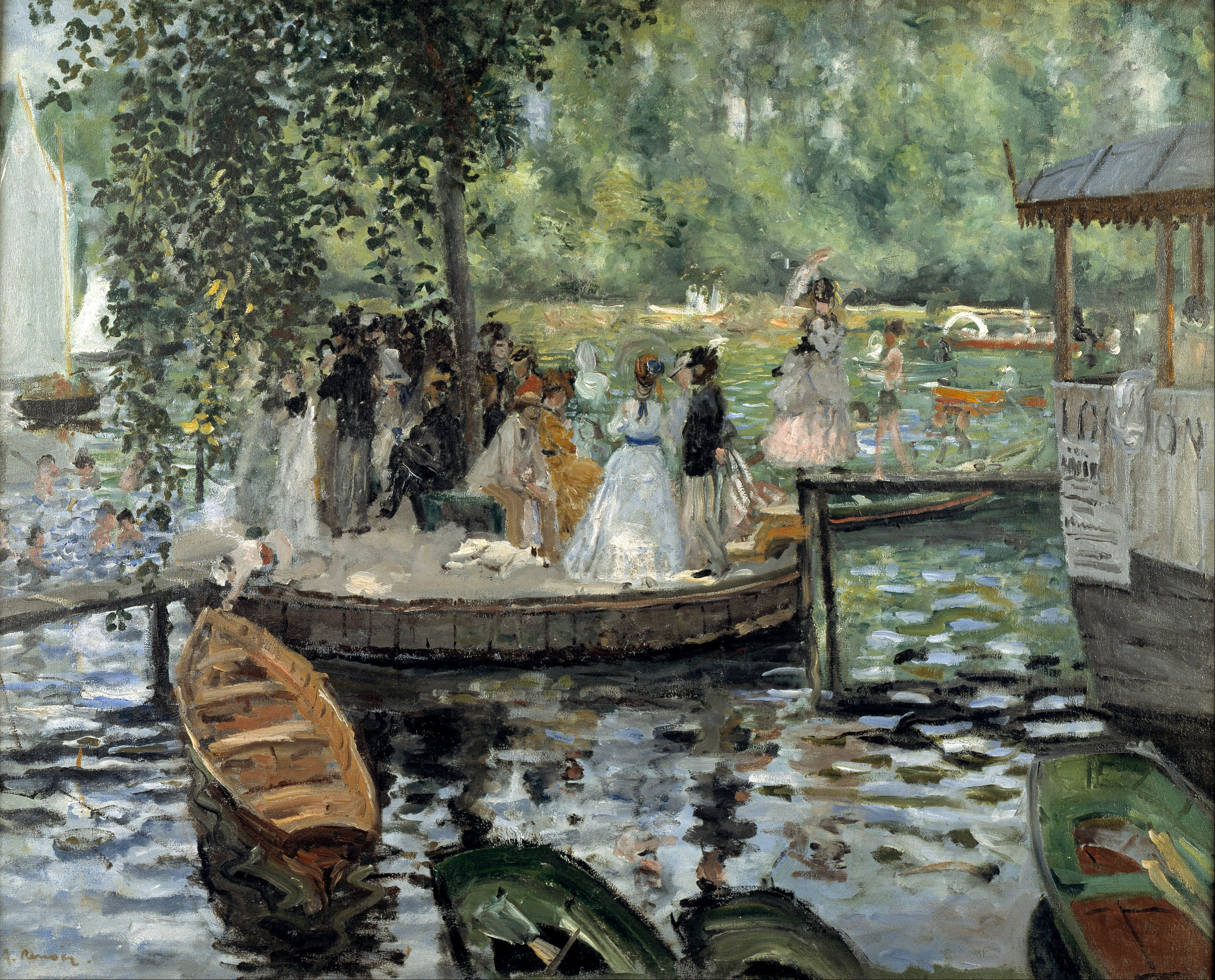
- Artist: Pierre-Auguste Renoir
- Year: 1869
- Medium: oil on canvas
- Dimensions: 66 cm × 81 cm (26 in × 32 in)
- Location: Nationalmuseum, Stockholm

La Grenouillère is an 1869 oil on canvas painting by Pierre-Auguste Renoir, now in the Nationalmuseum in Stockholm. It shows the "camembert", a small island planted with a single tree, linked by gangplanks to the Île de la Grenouillère (left, out of picture) and to the fashionable La Grenouillère floating restaurant and boat-hire at Croissy-sur-Seine near Bougival.

It was painted in the early days of Impressionism, at the same time as Claude Monet's La Grenouillère, with the two impoverished friends and fellow artists sitting side by side.

== See also ==
- List of paintings by Pierre-Auguste Renoir
