= La Grenouillère (Monet) =

Painting by Claude Monet

- Bain à la Grenouillère
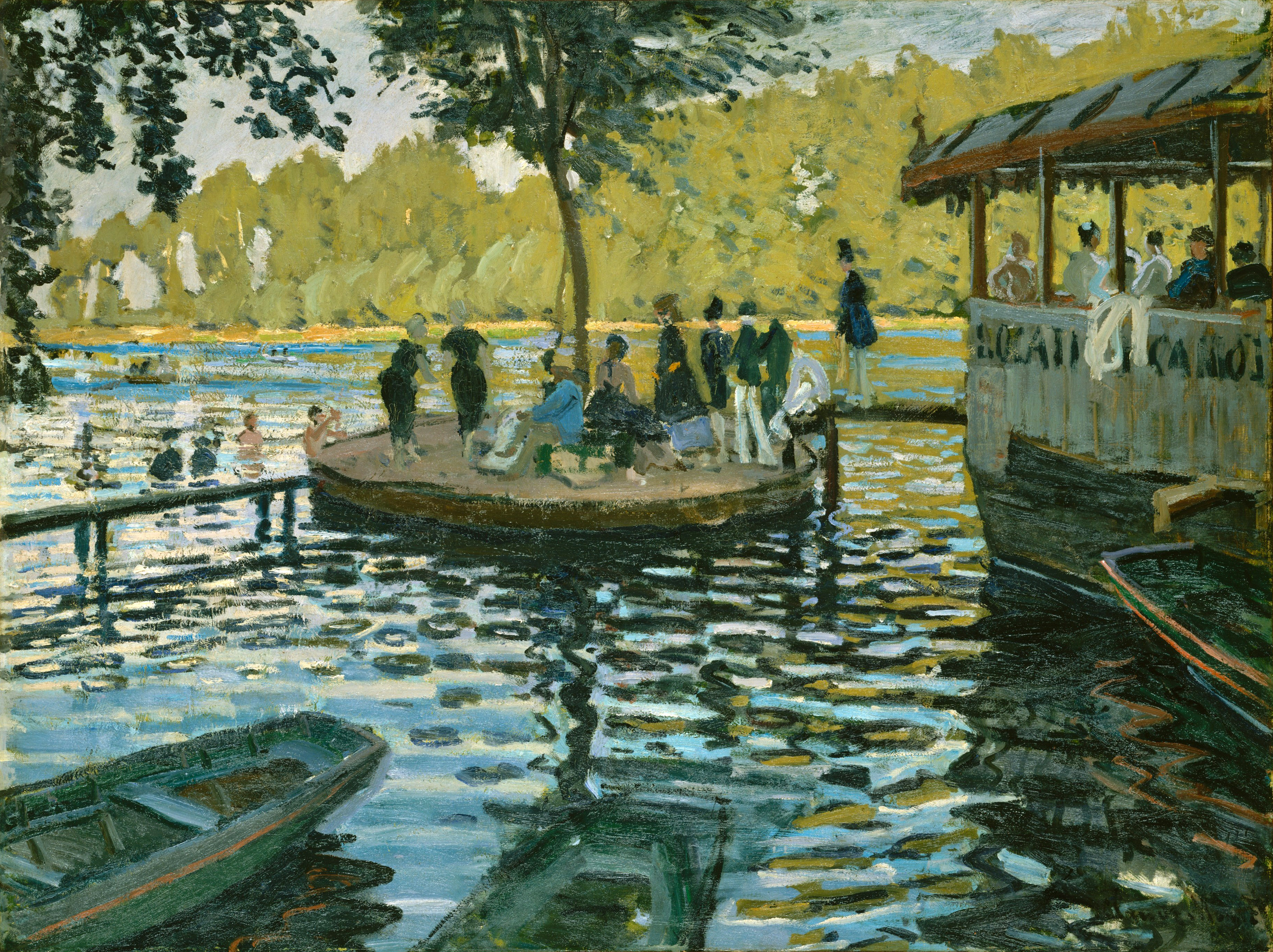
- Artist: Claude Monet
- Year: 1869
- Medium: oil paint, canvas
- Dimensions: 74.6 cm (29.4 in) × 99.7 cm (39.3 in)
- Location: Metropolitan Museum of Art, New York City
- Identifiers: The Met object ID: 437135

La Grenouillère is an 1869 painting by the French impressionist painter, Claude Monet (Oil on canvas, 74.6 cm x 99.7 cm). It depicts "Flowerpot Island", also known as the Camembert, and the gangplank to La Grenouillère, a floating restaurant and boat-hire on the Seine at Croissy-sur-Seine. He was accompanied by Pierre-Auguste Renoir, who also painted the scene at the same time.

== History ==
Monet wrote on September 25, 1869, in a letter to fellow artist Frédéric Bazille, "I do have a dream, a painting (tableau), the baths of La Grenouillère, for which I have made some bad sketches (pochades), but it is only a dream. Pierre-Auguste Renoir, who has just spent two months here, also wants to do this painting." Monet and Renoir, both desperately poor, were quite close at the time.

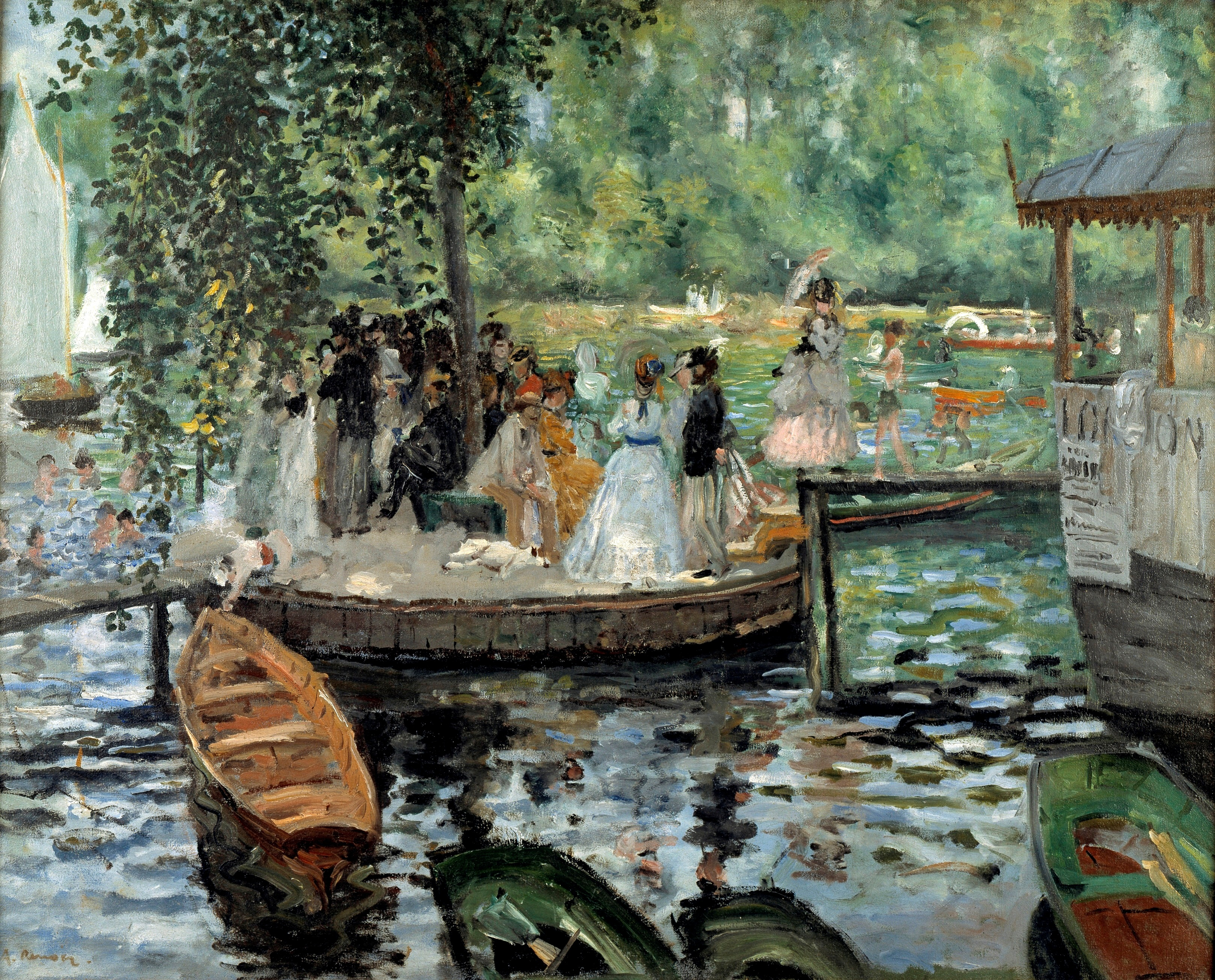
La Grenouillère, Pierre-Auguste Renoir

The painting here and one in the London National Gallery (Bathers at La Grenouillere, oil on canvas, 73 x 92 cm) are probably the sketches mentioned by Monet in his letter. A bigger size painting, now lost but formerly in the Arnhold collection in Berlin, may well have been the "tableau" that he dreamed of. The broad, constructive brushstrokes here are clearly those of a sketch. For his exhibition pictures Monet usually sought a more delicate and carefully calibrated surface at this time. An almost identical composition of the same subject by Renoir, La Grenouillère, is in the Nationalmuseum, Stockholm. The two friends were undoubtedly working side by side.

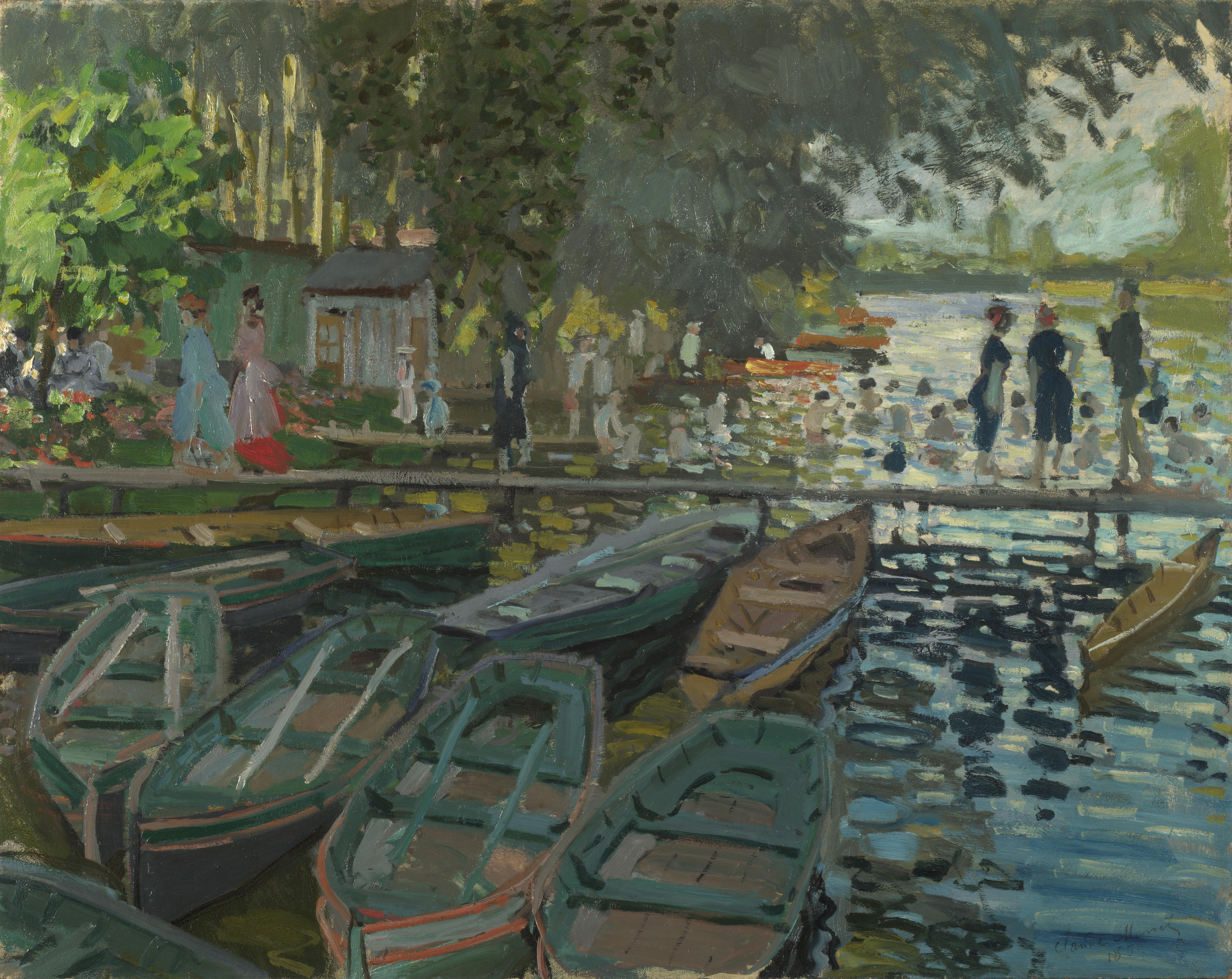
Bathers at la Grenouillére, Claude Monet. (Oil on canvas, 74.6 cm x 99.7 cm)

La Grenouillère was a popular middle-class resort consisting of a spa, a boating establishment and a floating café. Optimistically promoted as "Trouville-sur-Seine", it was located on the Seine near Bougival, easily accessible by train from Paris and had just been favoured with a visit by Emperor Napoleon III with his wife Empress Eugenie and son. Monet and Renoir both recognized in La Grenouillère an ideal subject for the images of leisure they hoped to sell.

La Grenouillère is the setting for Guy de Maupassant's 1881 short story "La femme de Paul". It is described as a place where "we smell, deep in our nostrils, the world's froth, all its distinguished scoundrels, the mould of Parisian society: a mixture of salesmen, show offs, lowly journalists, chaperoned young men, corrupt amateurs of the stock exchange, cretinous party animals, desiccated old pleasure seekers; a shady crowd of all suspect beings, half well known, half lost, half greeted, half dishonoured, swindlers, rascals, suppliers of women, lords of industry with a dignified look, the look of a blusterer which seems to be saying: "The first one that calls me a rogue, I'll bust him"."

== Description ==
As in his earlier picture of the Garden at Sainte-Adresse, Monet concentrated on repetitive elements – the ripples on the water, the foliage, the boats, the human figures – to weave a fabric of brushstrokes which, although emphatically brushstrokes, retain a strong descriptive quality.

== Provenance ==
The painting is now in the New York Metropolitan Museum of Art. It was bequeathed by Louisine Havemeyer in 1929.

== See also ==
- List of paintings by Claude Monet
