= Louis-Auguste Couvrechef =

French architect (1827–1858)

Louis Auguste Léodar Couvrechef
- Born: 1827; Mathieu, Calvados, France
- Died: 1858 (aged 30–31)
- Occupation: Architect
- Known for: Villa Eugénie

Louis Auguste Léodar Couvrechef (1827–1858) was a French architect who served Napoleon III as architect for the imperial residences.

== Early life ==
Louis Auguste Léodar Couvrechef was born in Mathieu, Calvados, in 1827.

== Education ==
He studied at the École des Beaux-Arts in Paris.

== Career ==
Couvrechef was made a sub-inspector under architect Hippolyte Durand on the project to build the Villa Eugénie in Biarritz as a summer residence for the imperial family, starting in 1854. Durand chose a rather austere design, and was abruptly dismissed in June 1855. Couvrechef, who was known to prefer a more decorative style, was given responsibility for continuing the work.

In 1857 Couvrechef became architect of the Château de Pau. Couvrechef was also involved in reconstruction of the Empress's Castillo de Arteaga in the province of Biscay in Spain, a medieval building surrounded by walls with four round towers.

== Death ==
Couvrechef died in 1858 and was replaced as architect of the imperial residences by Gabriel-Auguste Ancelet.

== Sources ==
- Granger, Catherine (2005). L'Empereur et les arts: la liste civile de Napoléon III. Librairie Droz. p. 235. ISBN 978-2-900791-71-4.
- Pénanrun, Louis Thérèse David de; Delaire, Edmond Augustin; Roux, Louis François (1907). Les architectes élèves de l'Ecole des beaux-arts 1793-1907. École nationale supérieure des beaux-arts (France). Librairie de la construction moderne. p. 223.
