= Gabriel-Auguste Ancelet =

French architect (1829–1895)

- Gabriel-Auguste Ancelet
- Born: 21 December 1829; Paris, France
- Died: 3 August 1895 (aged 65); Paris, France
- Occupation: Architect
- Known for: Compiègne Théâtre Impérial

Gabriel-Auguste Ancelet (French pronunciation: [ɡabʁijɛl oɡyst ɑ̃slɛ]; 21 December 1829 – 3 August 1895) was a French architect who undertook various projects for the Emperor Napoleon III, and later taught for many years at the École des Beaux-Arts in Paris.

== Birth and education ==
Gabriel-Auguste Ancelet was born in Paris on 21 December 1829. In 1845 he entered the studio of the architects Lequeux and Victor Baltard. From 1846 to 1851 he studied at the École des Beaux-Arts. In 1848 he won a prize for his drawing of "a fountain for Algeria". He won the Grand Prix de Rome for architecture in 1851 on the subject of "a hospice in the Alps".

Ancelet was a scholar resident at the Villa Medici between 1852 and 1855. In 1853 he drew a "Restoration of the decor of the porch of Macellum in Pompeii", making great efforts to accurately reproduce both the form and the colors of this unusual interior decoration. He drew reconstructions of the Appian Way, a military road built in 312 BC between Rome and Capua, drawing on the work of the archaeologist Luigi Canina and other sources. Since few remains of the buildings have been preserved, he was forced to draw on his imagination in depicting "an idea of the sumptuous and monumental characteristics that the road must have had." His work on the Appian Way was presented at the Exposition universelle (1867), where he won a gold medal.

== Career ==
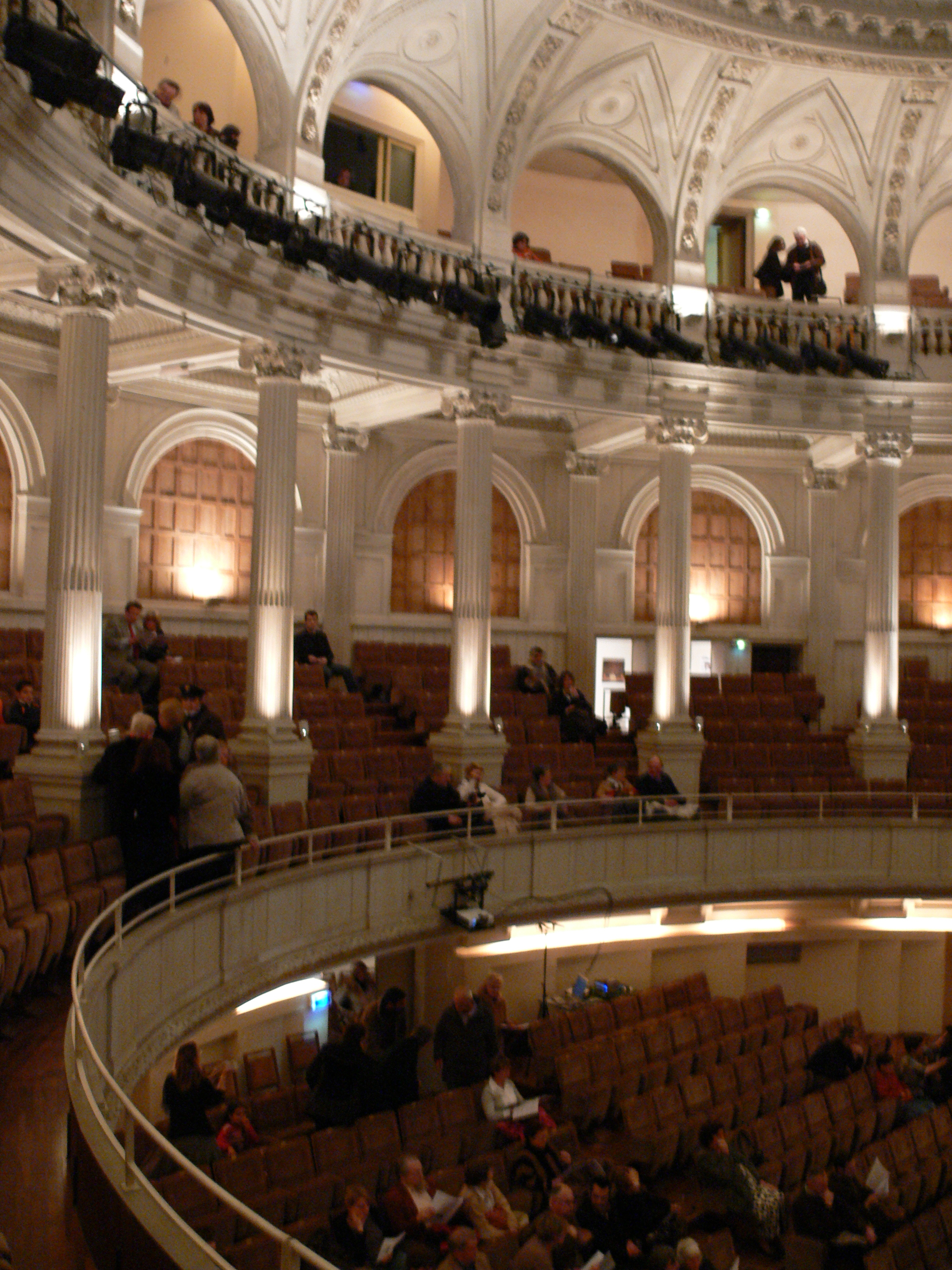
Théâtre Impérial de Compiègne

After his return to France, Ancelet worked at the National Archives and the Arsenal Library. In 1857 he was made auditor to the Board of civilian buildings. In 1858 he directed construction of the Natoire gallery at the Château de Compiègne. In January 1858 he was appointed architect for the Château de Pau, where he replaced Louis-Auguste Couvrechef, and for the summer residence of Villa Eugénie in Biarritz. At Pau his main concern was to replace the main entrance and the chancellery wing of the building so as to make a lighter and more visually appealing facade. He erected several buildings in Biarritz.

Ancelet was responsible for reconstruction of the Empress's Castillo de Arteaga near Bilbao in the province of Biscay in Spain, which Couvrechef had started. This was a medieval castle surrounded by four walls with round towers. He undertook reconstruction of the castle in 1859. The project involved building kitchens on the ground floor, a salon and dining room on the first floor, an antechamber and apartments for the imperial couple on the next floor and rooms at the top for the staff. Ancelet designed all the decorations. In 1859 Ancelet was charged with restoring and enlarging the church at Vieux-Moulin, near Compiègne. He added a new aisle, sacristy and bell tower.

Ancelet was replaced as architect at Pau by Auguste Lafollye in 1864. In 1865 he became the architect of the Château de Compiègne. He married Isabelle Foucher, daughter of Paul Foucher, brother-in-law of Victor Hugo. In 1866, at the request of the Emperor Napoleon III, he began design and construction of a new theater for the Château de Compiègne. Construction of the theater was halted in 1870 because of the Franco-Prussian War. Although he did not see the Théâtre Imperial completed, it remains a building of considerable architectural interest, with an ingenious use of metal for the higher parts of the building, a large stage opening and exceptional acoustics.

In 1872, Ancelet was named architect of the National Conservatory of Arts and Crafts. He became professor of ornamental design at the École des Beaux-Arts in Paris in 1873. In 1892 he was elected a member of the institute after the death of Antoine-Nicolas Bailly, charged with teaching "trois arts" at the École des Beaux-Arts. He died on 3 August 1895 in Paris.

== Principal works ==
- 1858-1864: Château de Pau renovations
- 1858-1864: Completion of construction of the Villa Eugénie and related buildings
- 1859: Castillo de Arteaga reconstruction
- 1859: Restoration and enlargement of the church at Vieux-Moulin
- 1865: Château de Compiègne improvements
- 1867-1891: New theater for the Château de Compiègne
- Enlargement of the École des Arts et Métiers, Paris
