= Hôtel du Palais =

Hotel in the resort town of Biarritz, France

Hôtel du Palais Biarritz
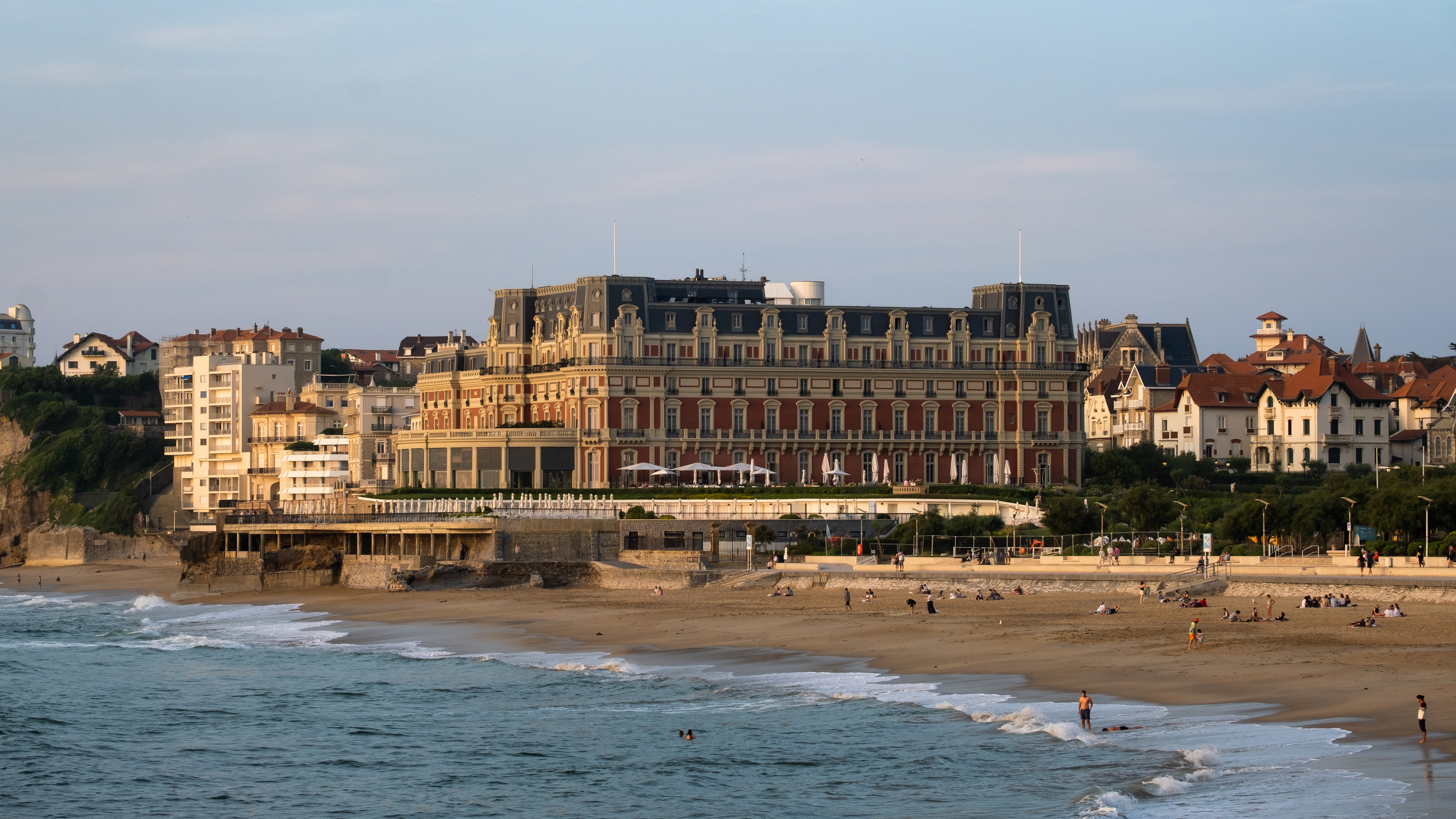
- View from the southwest

- Location within France

General information
- Location: Biarritz
- Coordinates: 43.486698°N 1.55639°W
- Opening: 1855; Reopened 1905 after reconstruction
- Operator: Hyatt

Website
- www.hyatt.com/en-US/hotel/france/hotel-du-palais-biarritz/biqub

The Hôtel du Palais Biarritz (Occitan: Ostal del Palai Biarritz; Basque: Palazio Otela Biarritz) is a historic luxury hotel beside the Atlantic beach in the resort town of Biarritz, on the Côte Basque in the French department of Pyrénées-Atlantiques. It was originally built for the Empress Eugénie around 1855 as a summer villa. It was due to the visits of the imperial couple that the village of Biarritz developed into a fashionable resort. In 1880, the villa was sold and converted into a hotel casino. It was devastated by fire in 1903, but was lavishly rebuilt and enlarged within the original walls. For many years the hotel attracted the international elite, including members of the European royalty such as King Edward VII, who paid several extended visits. Although the hotel later fell into disrepair, and closed for a period in the 1950s, it has since been refurbished and is again a luxury hotel. The hotel is managed by Hyatt and is a member of The Leading Hotels of the World.

== Original palace ==
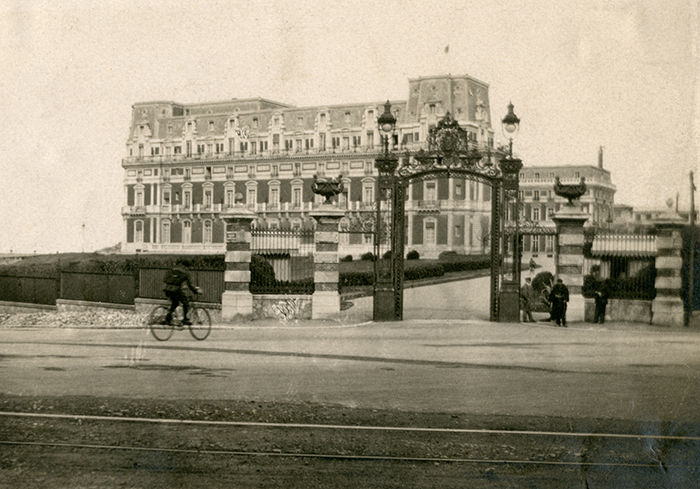
Hotel du Palais Biarritz in 1919

The building is set on the main beach of the town, which lies on the rugged coast of the Bay of Biscay at the foot of the Pyrenees. In 1854, the emperor Napoleon III and his wife Eugénie bought several acres of dunes in Biarritz and gave the engineer Dagueret the task of establishing a summer home surrounded by gardens, woods, meadows, a pond and outbuildings. Napoleon III chose the location near Spain so his wife would not get homesick for her native country.

Hippolyte Durand was given the job of designing the Villa Eugénie and outbuildings, and overseeing construction, which began in 1854. Durand was abruptly dismissed in June 1855 and replaced by the twenty-seven-year-old architect Louis-Auguste Couvrechef, who adopted a less austere style. Couvrechef died in 1858 and was succeeded by the architect Gabriel-Auguste Ancelet. Ancelet built a new wing facing the lighthouse before he was replaced by Auguste Lafollye, who added an attic with rooms for the staff.

The villa, in néo-Louis XIII style, consisted of a long main building with three perpendicular wings. The first two wings formed a court, while the third was shorter. A description in 1856 said that the two-story villa left much to be desired for such an important residence. It was excessively simple, with so little in the way of ornamentation that the facade looked bare. Later the facade was decorated with busts of members of the imperial family and regional personages. Victor Huguenin undertook the decoration with Corinthian columns and reliefs of arms and crowned eagles.

In 1830, Victor Hugo had expressed the hope that Biarritz would remain unspoiled. However, when the imperial family established its residence, it quickly became popular as a resort with the wealthy and aristocratic. The imperial family spent most of August and September at the villa each year, with a small entourage. Early visitors were not always impressed. An English magazine described the village in 1858 as:

... a spot now rendered classic by the visits of our imperial French ally, who has there erected a marine villa—the "Villa Eugénie"—commanding an extensive view of the cruel grey expanse of the Bay of Biscay; the really beautiful landscape towards the Spanish frontier being skillfully excluded. Sans this landscape, and taking the village in itself, lo! we are transported once more to the outskirts of Brighton. Brightonian dwellings, square, and new, and ugly, meet our bewildered gaze on every side, and in miniature proportions. But here the likeness stops. In vain we look for esplanade and goat-chaises; Biarritz boast them not. In vain we sigh for cupola and dome, and, sighing, learn that even the Villa Eugénie lacks the eccentric beauty of our own Pavilion!

== Development of Biarritz ==
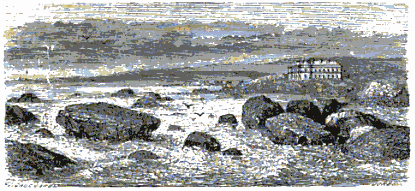
Villa Eugénie c. 1867, showing the rugged coast and isolated position at that time.

In 1864, land was purchased on which to erect a chapel designed by Émile Boeswillwald, the inspector general of historical monuments. The chapel, dedicated to Our Lady of Guadeloupe, was consecrated in September 1865 and incorporated an eclectic mix of Roman and Byzantine art with Hispano-Moorish elements from Seville and Granada. Alexandre-Dominique Denuelle and Louis Steinheil completed the decorative painting. In 1867, the villa was renovated and another floor was added. An 1867 description was still unenthusiastic:

A few minutes before we reach Biarritz, we pass on our right hand the private chapel of the Empress, and the gates leading to the Villa Eugénie, to the latter of which a large box is attached with the words 'BOÎTE AUX PETITIONS,' inscribed in prominent letters. The Villa itself we can see through the shrubbery, a plain substantial building close to the shore ... but bare and bleak-looking, exposed on every side to the wind, although the shrubs and trees that were planted around it have grown up during the last two or three years, and give it an appearance of shelter on the land side. It is the least picturesque and the bleakest spot in Biarritz, and almost the only one, whence no good view of the Spanish mountains ... can be obtained.

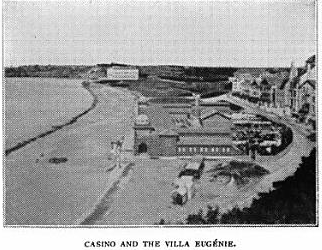
Villa Eugénie c. 1898. The town has grown closer, and the villa, still relatively low, is no longer as isolated.

Biarritz remained fashionable after the fall of the dynasty in 1870. With the return to a republican constitution for France, the question of ownership of the villa and its contents, and of other property of the Bonapartes, became a topic of parliamentary debate. It was agreed that the state would take possession of the most valuable furnishings. In 1880, the Empress Eugenie sold the estate to the Banque de l'Union Parisienne. The villa was converted into a hotel casino, the "Palais Biarritz". In 1893, it became a prestigious hotel receiving royalty including Queen Victoria and the Empress Elisabeth of Austria, better known by the nickname Sisi.

According to an 1883 travel book:

Biarritz is a small but picturesque town, which was brought much into notice by the Empress Eugenie, who used to reside there every year. It is distinguished for its very selected society, which assembles both for sea bathing and the winter season. The scenery is beautiful, although the vegetation in the immediate environs of the town is rather scanty. The town is built like an amphitheatre on the rising cliffs of the Pyrenees, and has some fine modern buildings, of which the Villa Eugenie is one of the most striking.

== Grand hotel ==
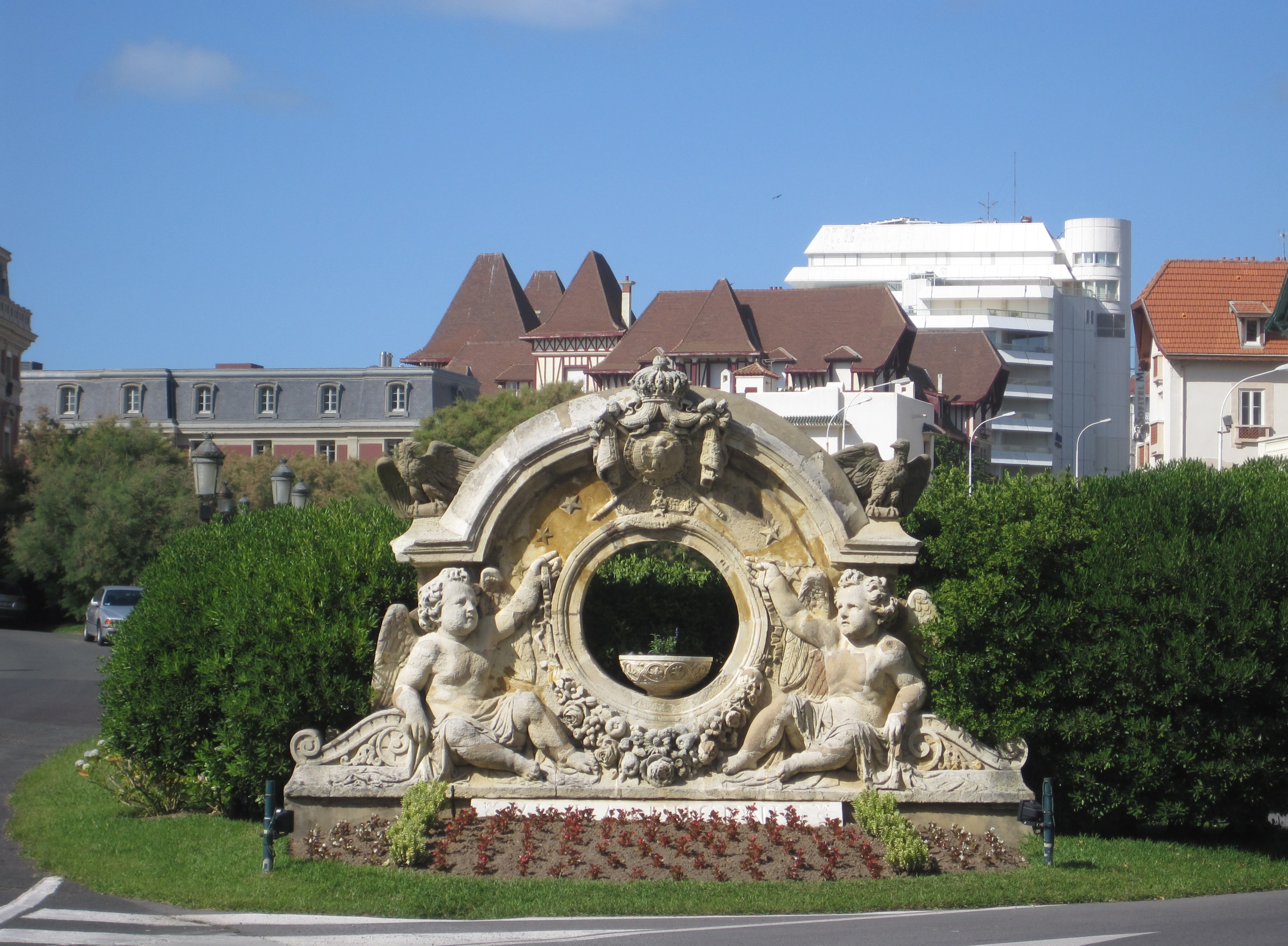
Sculpture at the foot of the driveway, just inside the main gates. The hotel is out of view to the left.

The hotel was badly damaged by fire in 1903 with only the imperial chapel unharmed. The fashionable architect Édouard Niermans was given the task of reconstruction. He preserved the exterior walls, which were tied into the reinforced concrete of the new structure. Niermans extended the south wing, added two stories, and a large bay holding a magnificent semi-circular restaurant looking over the sea. There were now three hundred rooms and apartments. The new walls were covered with brick, stone and slate. The hotel contained larger salons for entertaining by the royalty who frequented it, and a salle des fêtes in Second Empire style. The project completed in 1905.

The hotel became a destination for the international elite, King Edward VII of the UK stayed at the hotel several times in the 1900s. He described his rooms as charming, and found that the sea air relieved his breathing difficulties, however he complained that Biarritz itself was smelly, and asked for something to be done about the drains. In April 1908, H. H. Asquith came to the hotel for the king to make him prime minister of the UK in succession to Henry Campbell-Bannerman, who was dying.

The hotel remained fashionable after World War I. Biarritz in the 1920s was known as "queen of resorts and resort of Kings", and also attracted movie stars, gangsters and politicians. Alfred Savoir used the hotel as the setting for his comedy of high society Un Homme. After Spain became a republic in April 1931, many of the Spanish nobility moved to the hotel, near the border, to await the time when they could return.

== Recent years ==
After World War II, the Hôtel du Palais was forced to close for a period in the 1950s. It took a campaign by the mayor to obtain funding to refurbish and reopen the building, under the slogan "No Palace, No Millionaires". Guests have included Coco Chanel, Ava Gardner and Frank Sinatra. The façades and roofs of the hotel were listed as historical monuments on 24 December 1993. The hotel is now at the heart of the modern town of Biarritz, accessible from the lower end of the main shopping street through great wrought-iron gates that encircle the property.

As of 2012, the hotel had 124 rooms and 30 suites decorated in period style. The hotel includes excellent restaurants, a bar and a pool. The decor is still reminiscent of the hotel's past as an aristocratic gathering place, and prices are high. The hotel is set among historic grounds, reached by a grand driveway. The hotel joined the Unbound Collection division of Hyatt in 2018.

== Gallery ==
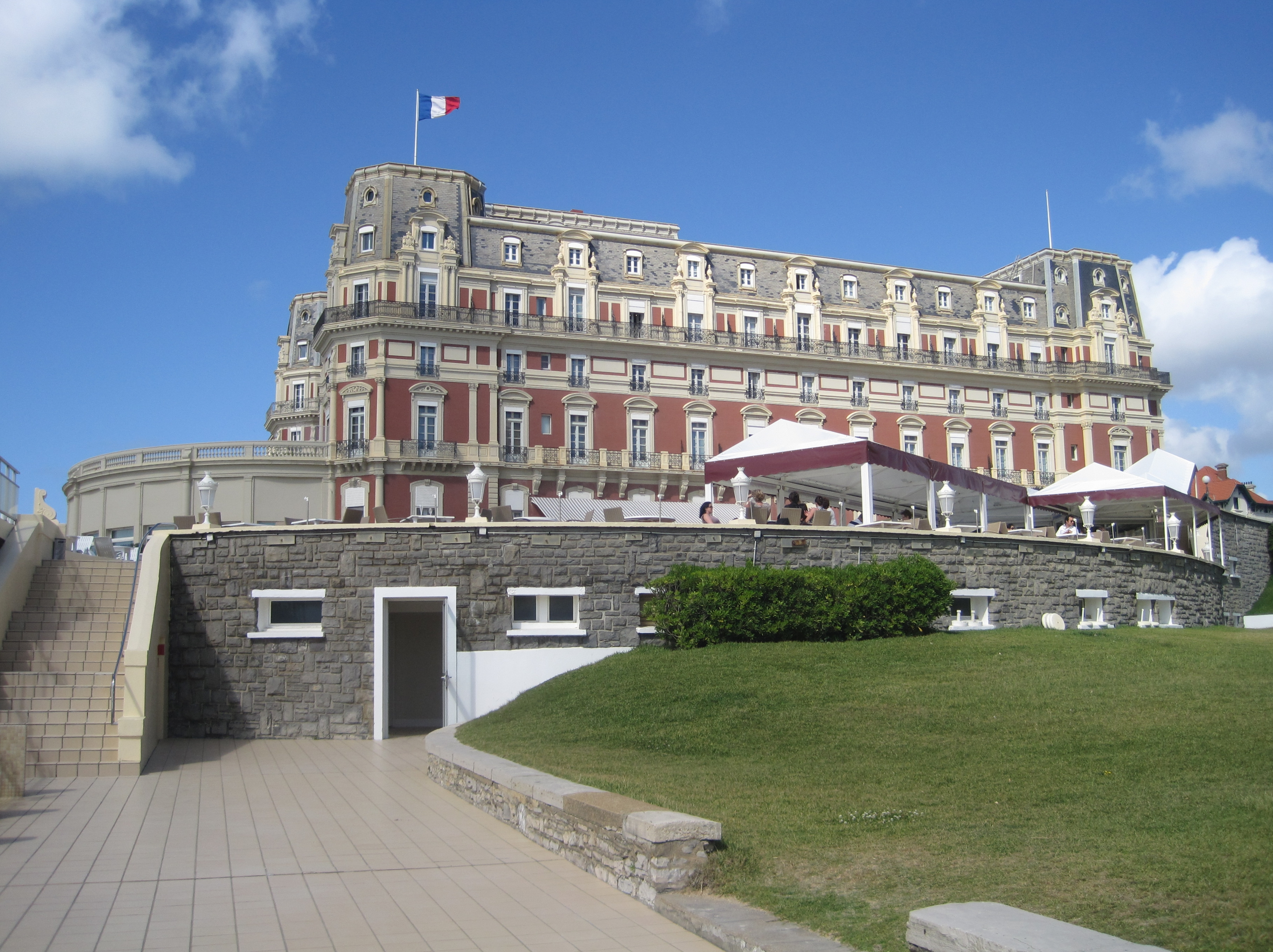
View from the southwest

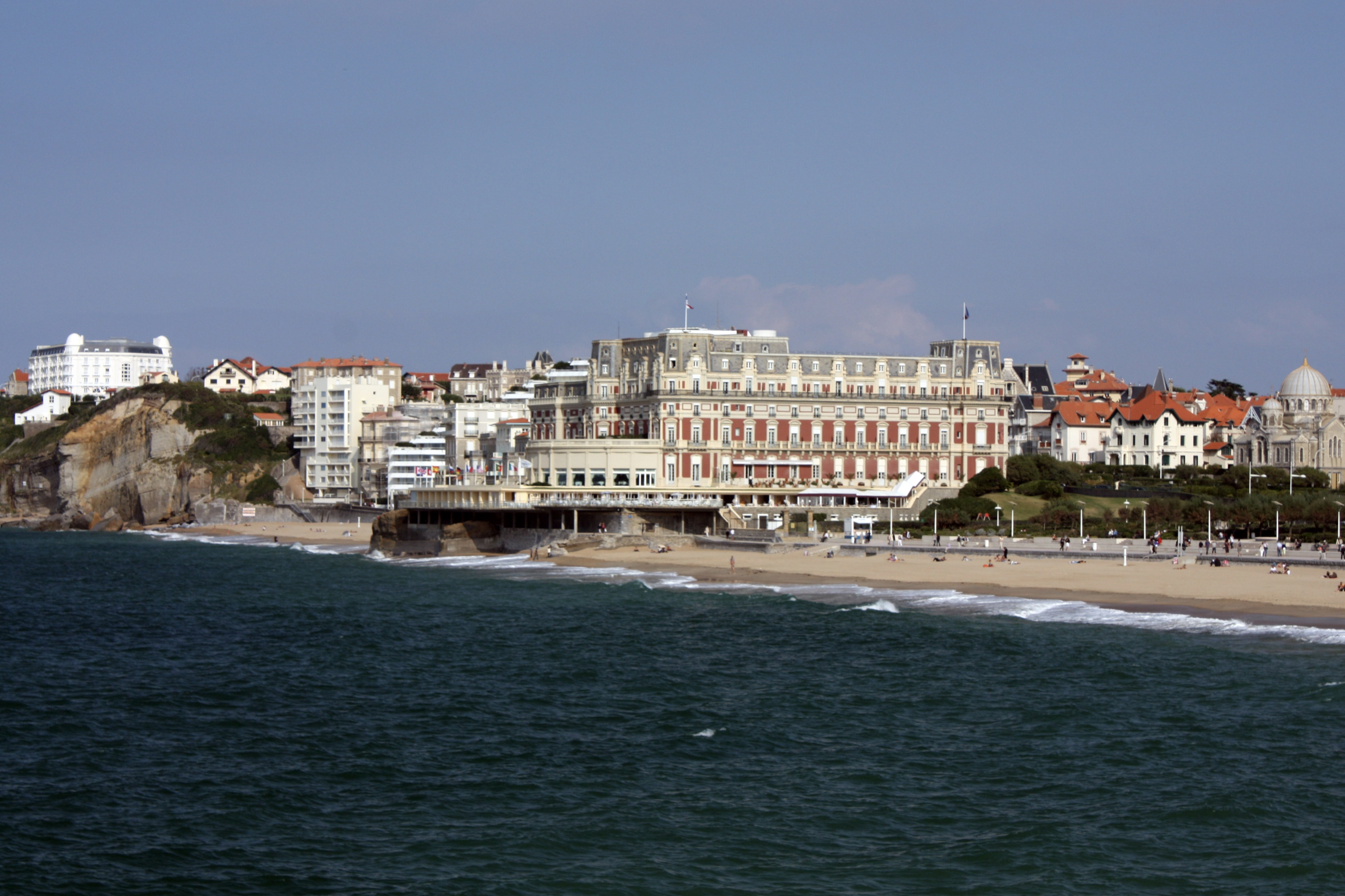
View from the west

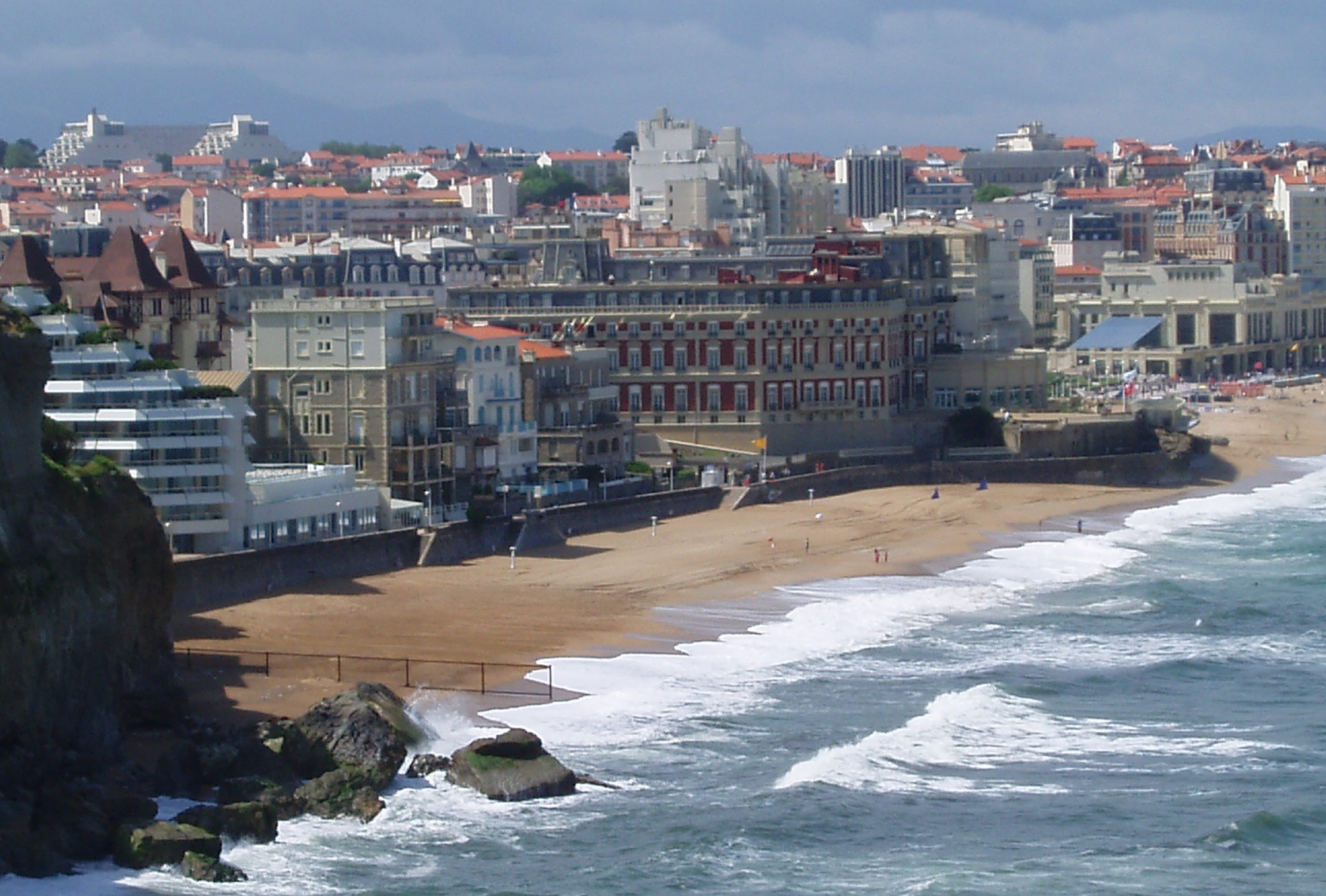
View from the north
