= Auguste Lafollye =

French architect (1828-1891)

Joseph-Auguste Lafollye
- Born: 1828
- Died: 1891 (aged 62–63); Paris, France
- Occupation: Architect
- Known for: Château de Pau restoration

Joseph-Auguste Lafollye (1828-1891) was a French architect. He is known for his restoration of the Château de Pau and other major public buildings.

== Career ==
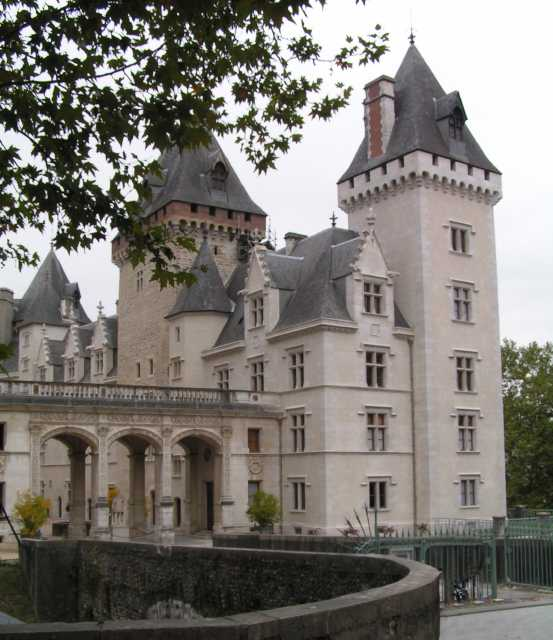
Château de Pau after being restored

Joseph-Auguste Lafollye was born in 1828. He studied architecture at the school of architecture in the Académie des Beaux-Arts (Paris) under M. Gilbert, and won the school's second prize in 1855.

Lafollye and Gabriel-Auguste Ancelet were the architects for the restoration of the Château de Pau. During the construction of the Villa Eugénie for the Emperor Napoleon III and his wife Eugénie, Ancelet was given responsibility for the project in 1857, and then Lafollye was assigned to the project in 1864. Lafollye added an attic with rooms for the staff.

Working under the direction of Eugène Viollet-le-Duc, Lafollye was responsible for restoring the rich statuary of the 16th century Hôtel de Ville at Compiègne, which had been vandalized during the revolution. He restored the abbey church of Saint-Jean de Sorde-l’Abbaye and the old Cathédrale Notre-Dame-de-l'Assomption de Lescar. He restored the church of Saint André at Sauveterre-de-Béarn, which dates back to at least 1251, between 1867 and 1869. This involved restoring the western facade, building the porch and vestry, and a complete renovation and restoration of the main gate.

Lafollye was the architect for the courthouse at Pau, Pyrénées-Atlantiques. In 1863 he was assigned the job of building a new church at Oloron-Sainte-Marie to replace the old chapel of the Capuchins. The foundation stone was laid on 15 August 1869. In 1870 he was awarded a medal of honor at the Salon for the design of the church of Notre-Dame at Oloron, and his drawings of the restoration of the Château de Pau. Joseph-Auguste Lafollye was decorated in 1876. At the Exposition Universelle (1878) he received a first class medal.

There were delays and disputes over the quality of the work at Oloron between Lafollye, the contractor and the municipality. Eventually, in 1883 Lafollye resigned. Napoleon III had assigned the task of restoring the Château de Saint-Germain-en-Laye to Eugène Millet, who started the work in 1862. Lafollye took over responsibility in 1879 on Millet's death, continuing until 1889. His goal, and that of his successor Honoré Daumet, was to restore the French Renaissance style of Francis I.

Joseph-Auguste Lafollye was made an officer of the Academy in 1889. He died in Paris in 1891 at his home on the Rue Richepanse, aged sixty three. Auguste Lafollye's son Charles Paul Lafollye was also an architect, who obtained honorable mention at the Exposition Universelle (1889) in Paris.

== Gallery ==
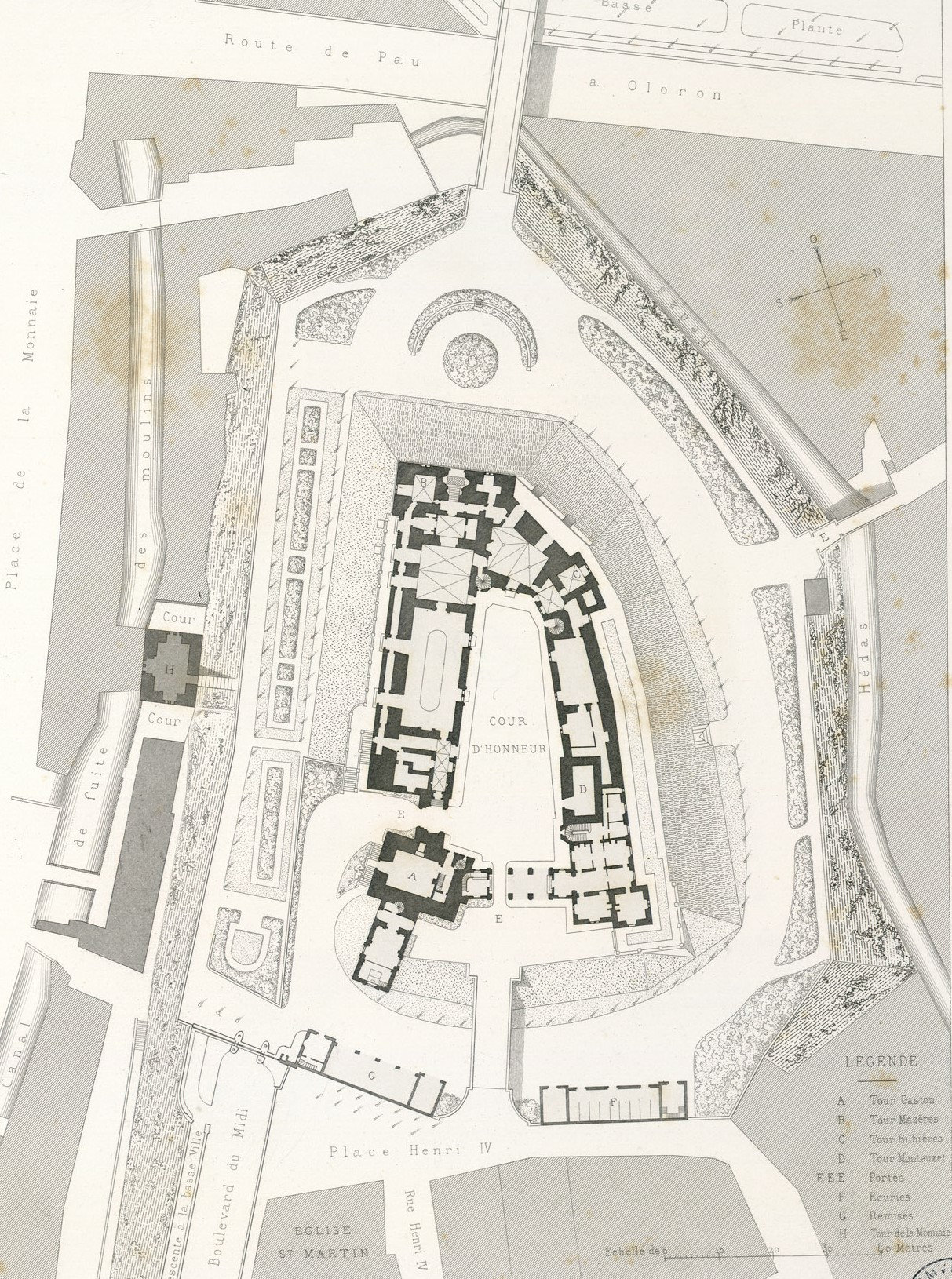
General plan of the Château de Pau

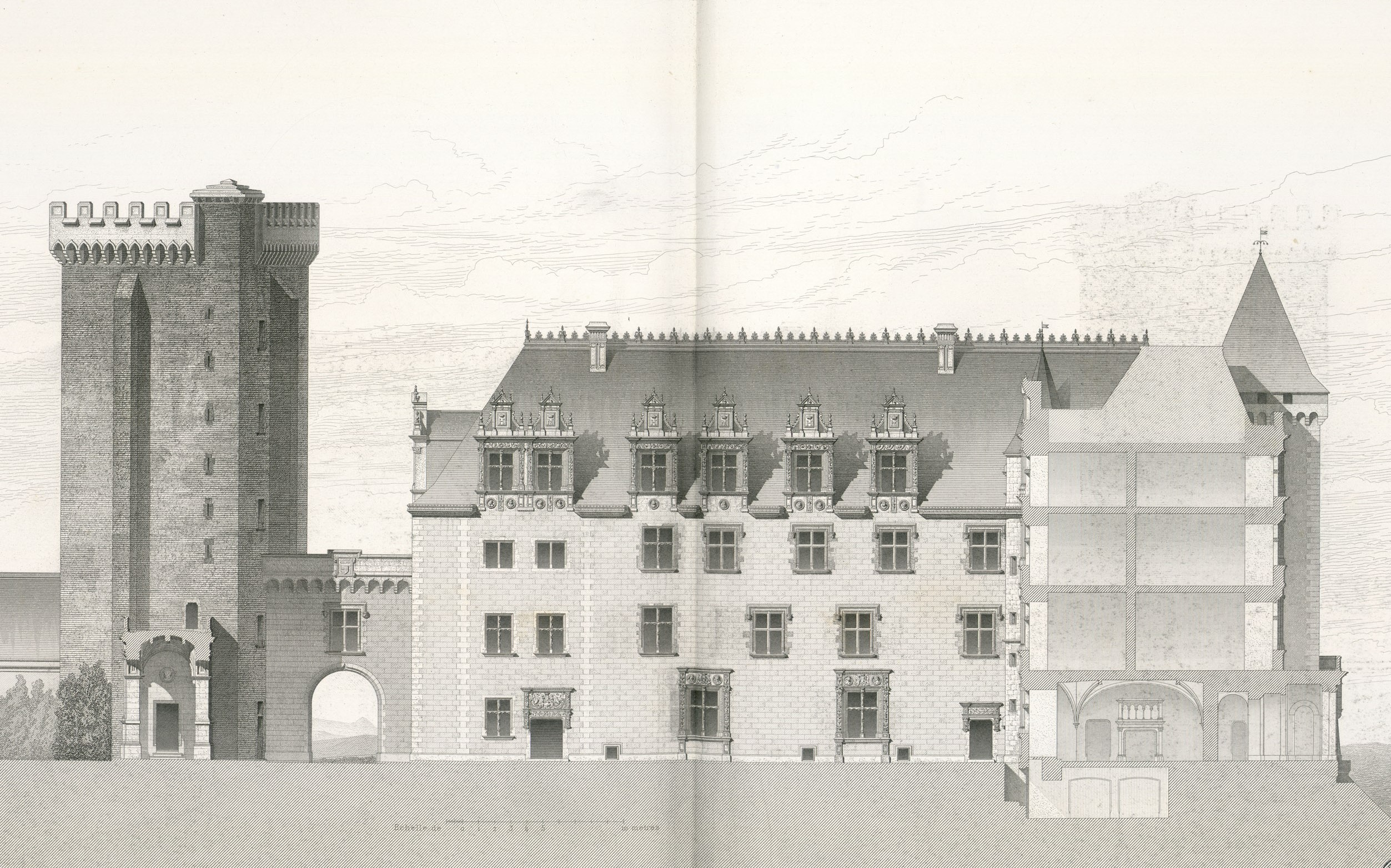
Facade (1882)

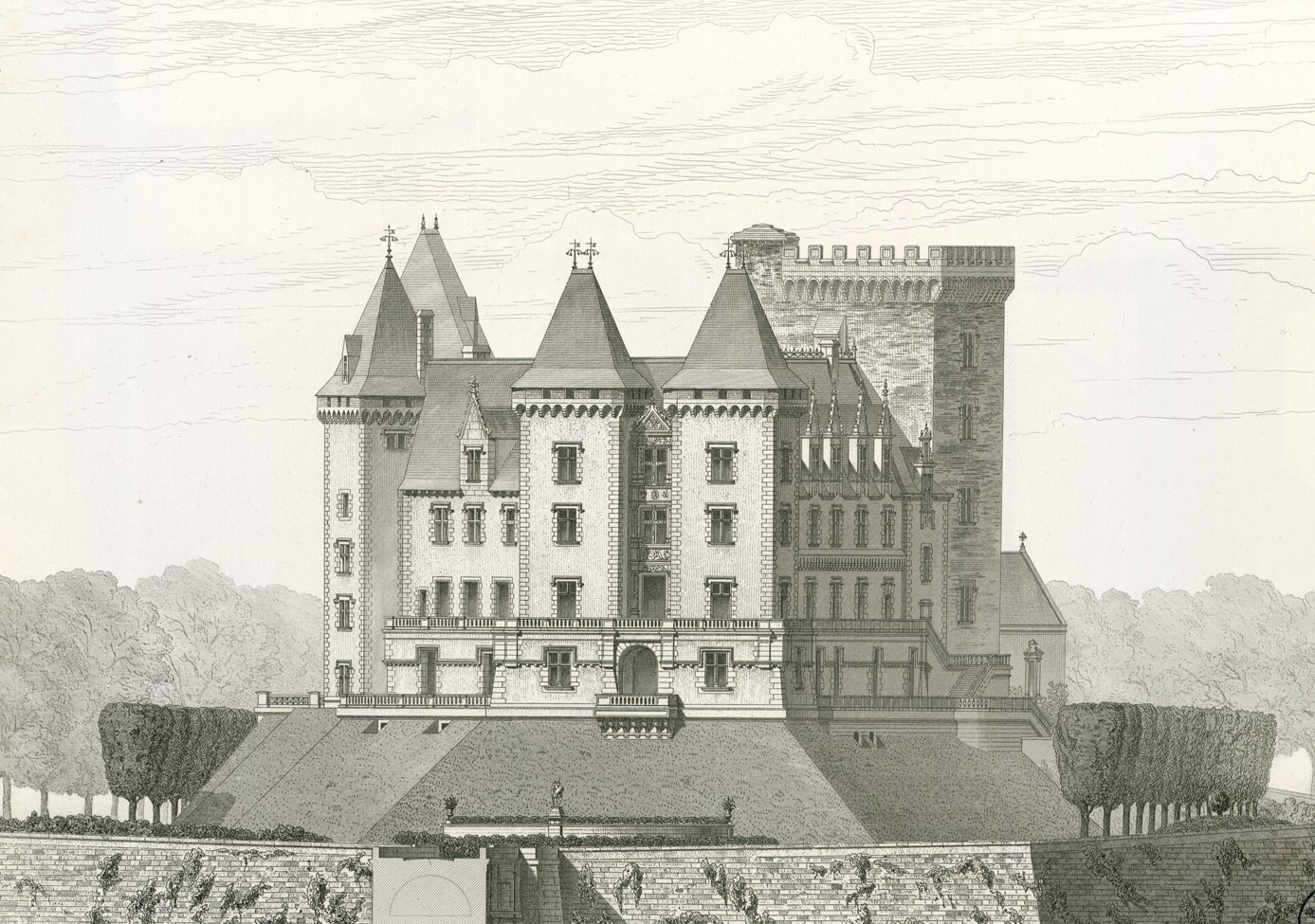
Southwest elevation

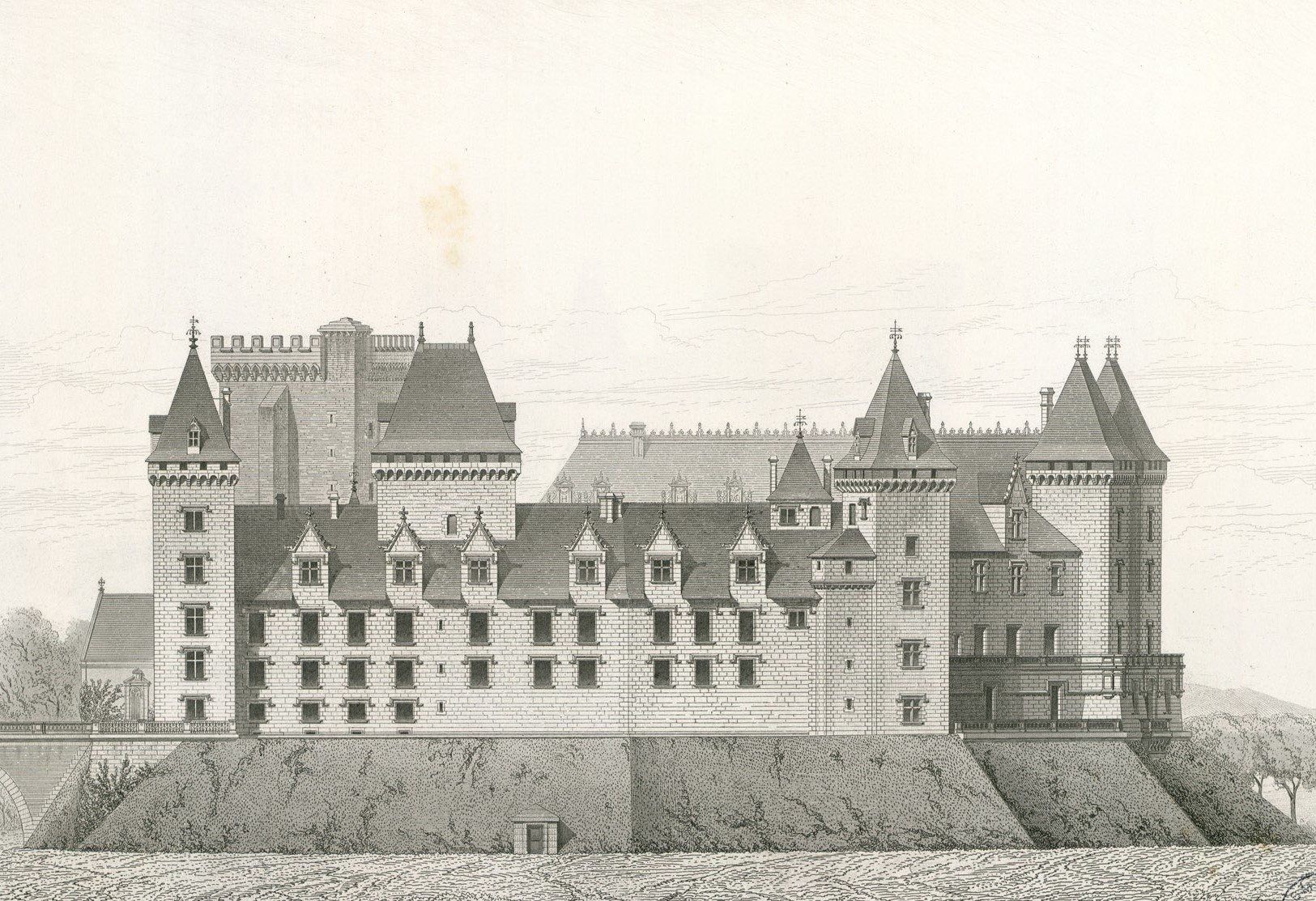
Northern elevation

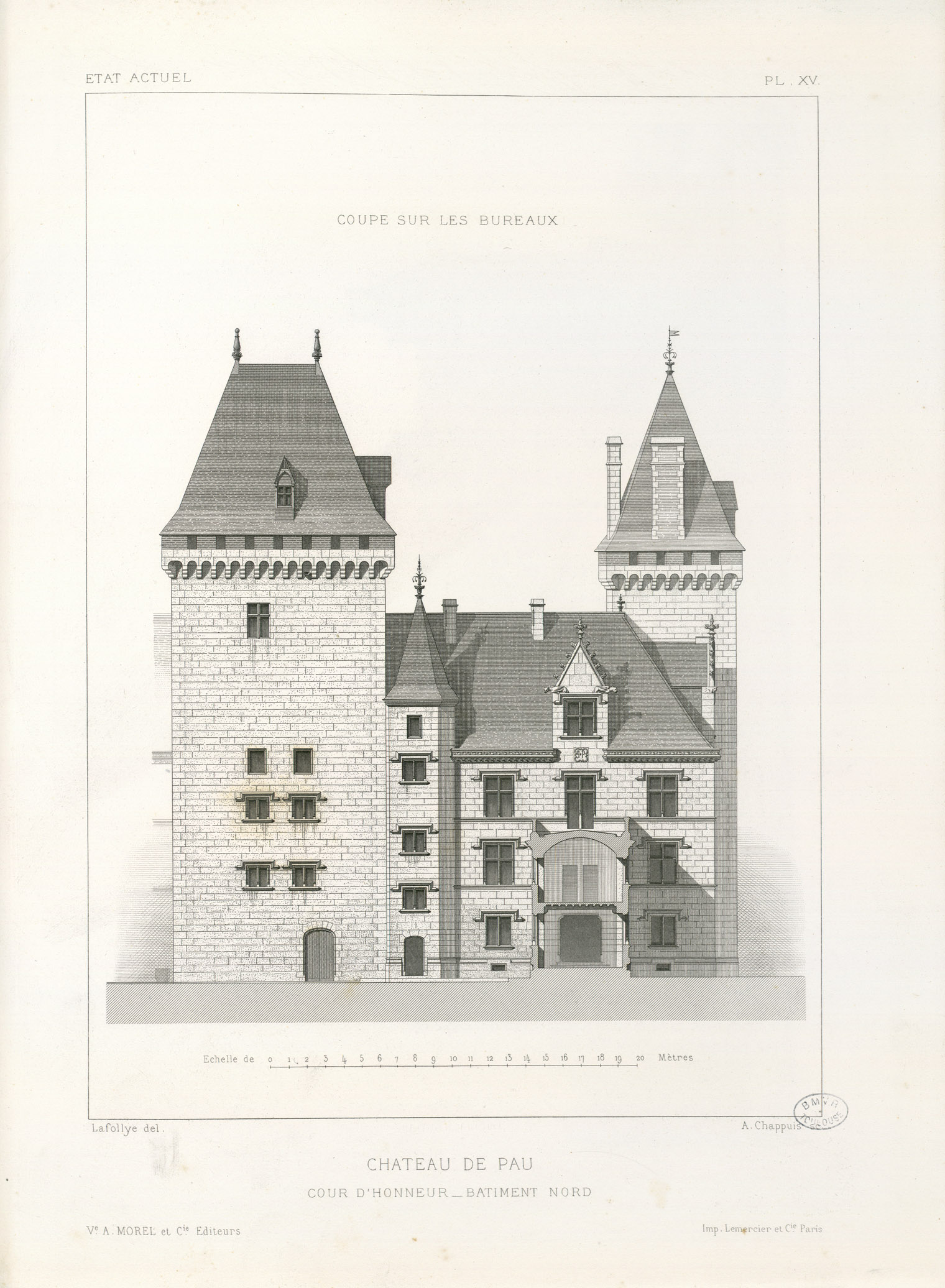
North end

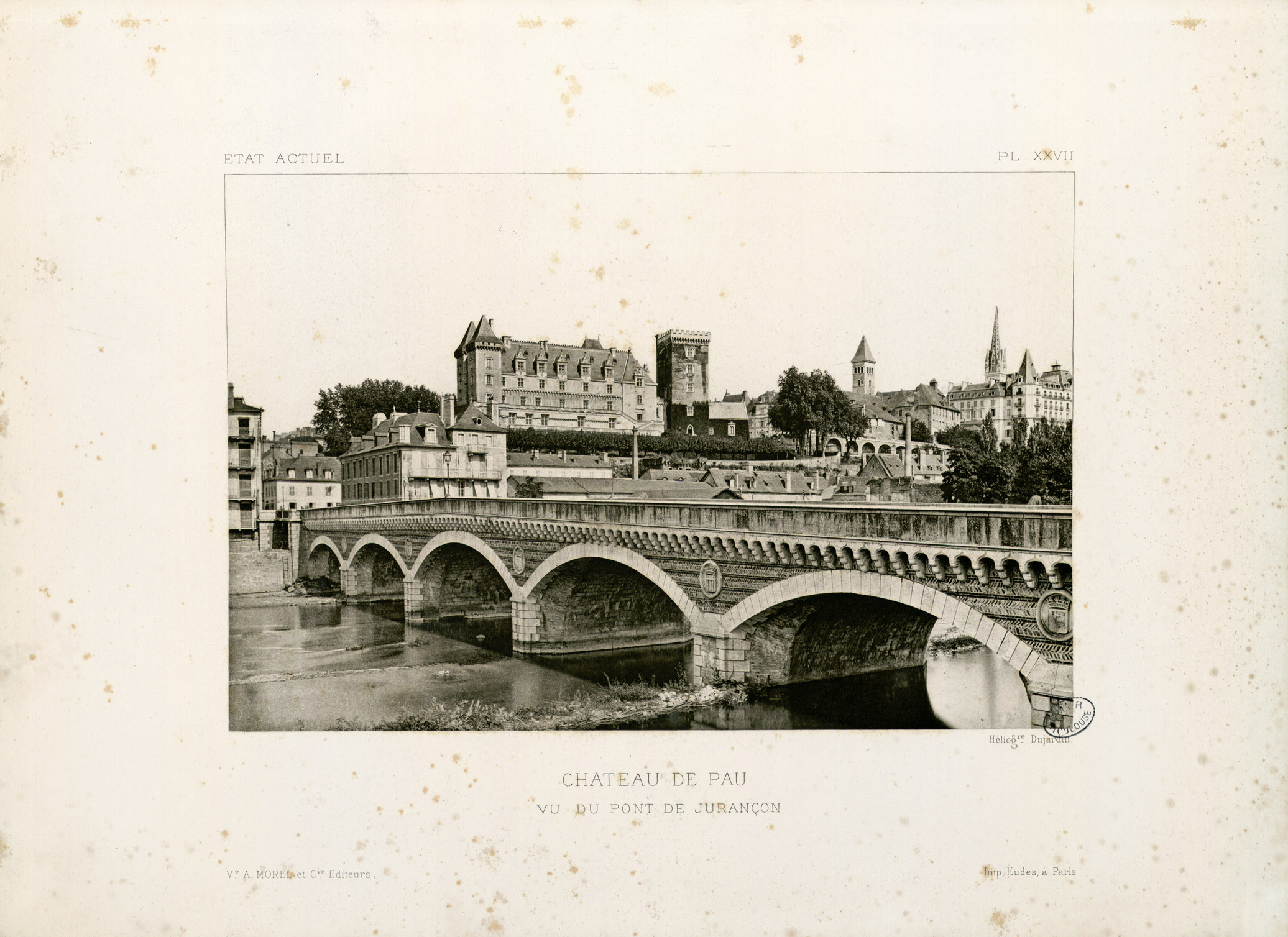
View of the chateau from the Jurançon bridge

== Bibliography ==
- Lafollye, August (1882). Le Chateau de Pau: histoire et description. Paris.

Lafollye published works about other historical buildings, including the Château de Compiègne and the Chateau of Saint-Germain.
