= Louis Charles Auguste Steinheil =

French painter

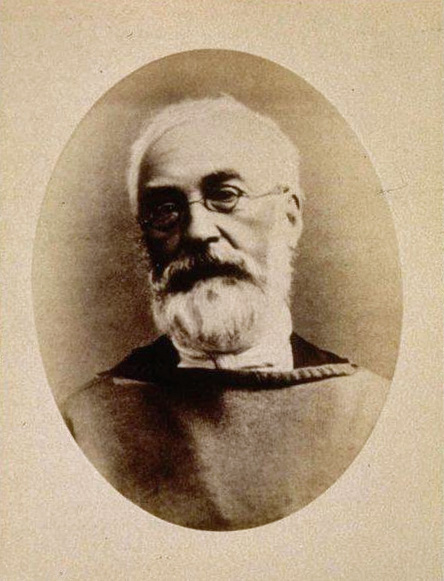
- Born: 26 June 1814; Strasbourg, France
- Died: 17 May 1885 (aged 70); Paris, France
- Education: Académie Suisse
- Occupation: Painter
- Known for: Stained glass and church decoration

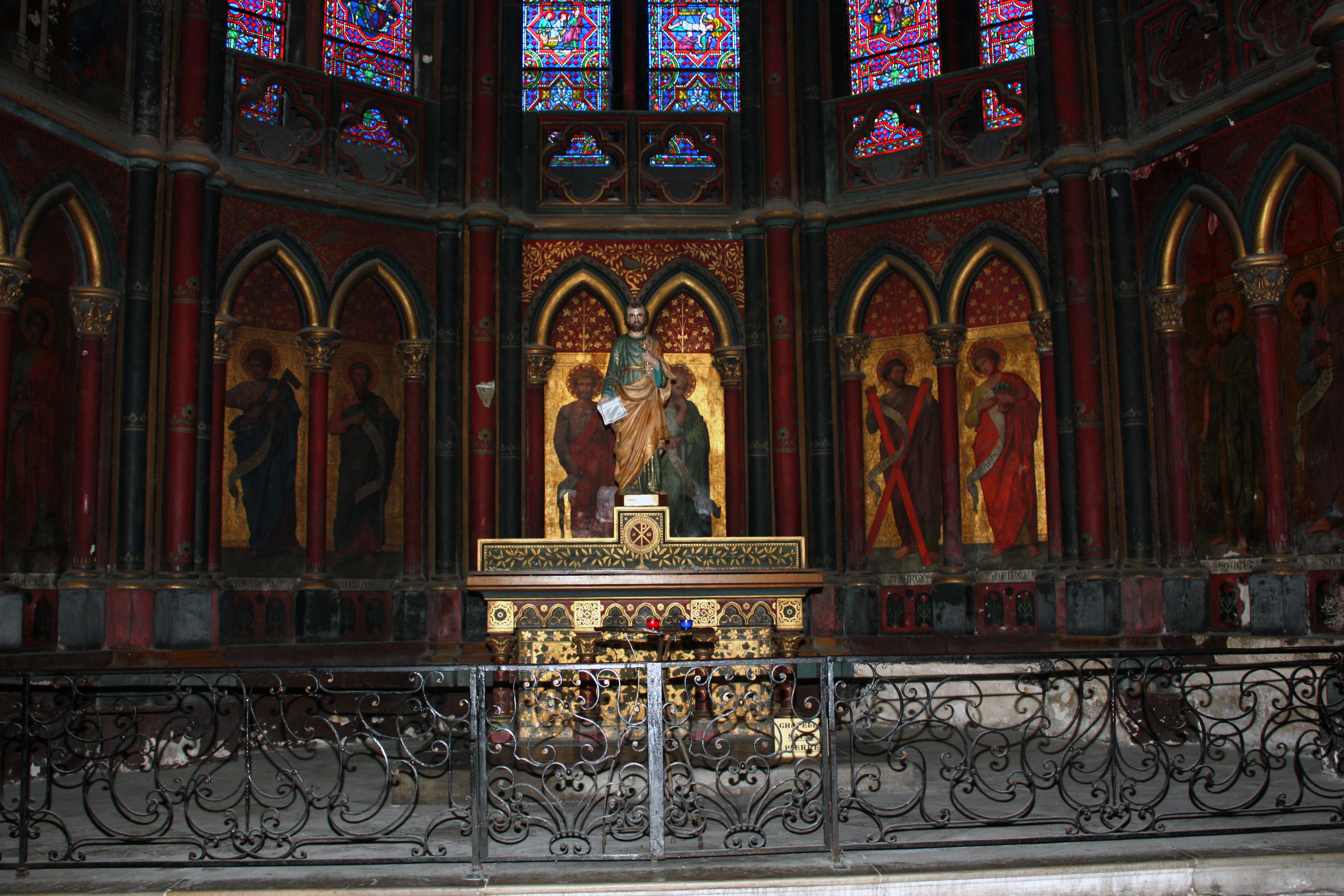
Cathédrale Notre-Dame, Bayonne: Chapelle Saint-Pierre.

Louis Charles Auguste Steinheil (born Strasbourg, 26 June 1814; died Paris, 17 May 1885) was a French painter.

== Biography ==
Louis Steinheil studied with Henri Decaisne and painted in nearly every medium, but gave special attention to glass painting and church decoration. Among his works are Saint Philomela (1841); Mother (1847), Nantes Museum. He and Alexandre-Dominique Denuelle were commissioned to paint the chapel of Our Lady of Guadeloupe, consecrated in September 1865, which was built for the Empress Eugénie beside her Villa Eugénie in Biarritz. In 1876 he was commissioned to execute frescoes in the Strasbourg Cathedral.
