= Castillo de la Emperatriz Eugenia de Montijo =

- Eugenia de Montijo enperatrizaren gaztelua
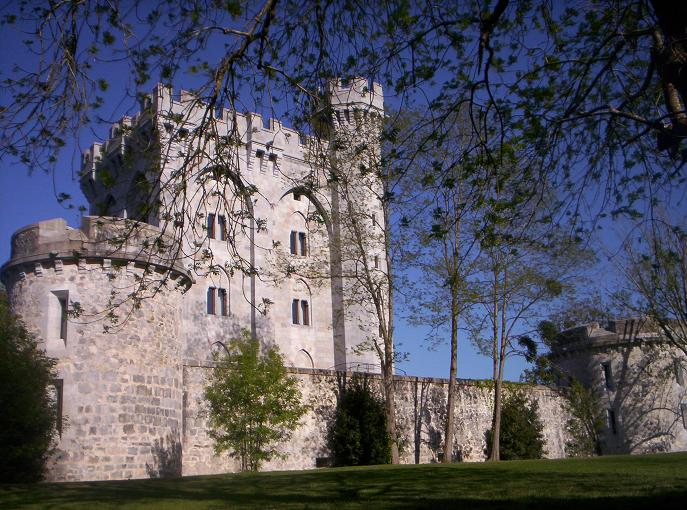

- Location within Spain

General information
- Type: Chateau
- Architectural style: Neo-Gothic
- Location: Arteaga, Spain
- Coordinates: 43.35202°N 2.654287°W
- Construction started: 1859

Technical details
- Floor count: 5

Design and construction
- Architect: Gabriel-Auguste Ancelet

The Castillo de la Emperatriz Eugenia de Montijo (Basque: Eugenia de Montijo enperatrizaren gaztelua) is a neo-Gothic castle in the village of Arteaga, near Bilbao in the Basque Country of Spain. It is designated a Basque Heritage building.

== Location ==
The castle is located in a fertile part of the Urdaibai estuary, not far from the historic town of Guernica. Unlike Spanish castles built for defense, it is not in an elevated position but on a plain or meadow, surrounded by trees and other vegetation. In this respect it resembles Fontainebleau Castle and other French royal residences.

== History ==
The original manor house was said to have been built in the eighth century by Fortún Ortúnez and Sancho Gaúteguiz, and was destroyed and rebuilt many times. The castle was built on the foundations of a tower mentioned in writings from the mid-fifteenth century. By the nineteenth century it was very run down, having been used as a farmhouse. The tower was owned by the Arteaga family, who were related to the Montijo family and thus to the Empress Eugénie de Montijo, wife of Napoleon III of France.

The decision to build the new castle, or chateau, was in response to a decree in 1856 by the assembly of Basque country that the Prince Imperial was a Viscayan. They said that the newly-born prince was descended from the lords of Arteaga and Montijo, and he was thus Señor de las Torres de Arteaga. At the request of the empress, the emperor sent his architects to the town to draw up plans for the new building and undertake construction.

Louis-Auguste Couvrechef was assigned the project, and then Gabriel-Auguste Ancelet took over responsibility. The concept was a medieval castle surrounded by four walls with round towers. Ancelet undertook reconstruction of the castle in 1859. The project involved building kitchens on the ground floor, a salon and dining room on the first floor, an antechamber and apartments for the imperial couple on the next floor and rooms at the top for the staff. Ancelet designed all the decorations. Many of the works were made by French entrepreneurs and artisans, such as Bernard, the painter and decorator from Bagnères-de-Luchon. A park was laid out, and after many delays the project was near completion in 1873, the year that the Emperor died.

According to an 1882 travel guide, the chateau had been "restored in sumptuous style" but was not finished. The imperial family never dwelt in the chateau. When Eugenia was dethroned and wanted to settle in Spain, she was hosted by Alba in Madrid and Seville, and did not use the castle. A visitor in 1891 found the chateau closed up, and the grounds unkempt. The property has been converted into an upscale hotel with 13 rooms and one suite.

== Structure ==
The castle is neo-medieval, built in the French Gothic style when Romanticism was in fashion. The castle has ogival arches, gargoyles with figures of animals, double windows and battlements. The floor of the central tower is a rectangle of 17 by 12 metres (56 by 39 ft), which is attached at an angle to an octagonal tower inside which is the staircase that connects the different floors. The castle is faced with gray marble, with red jasper around the arched windows. On each of its four sides, two ogival arches rise from the base to the highest level, each containing four windows, two on each level. The castle has a superb coat of arms on the main facade.

The castle has five floors, excluding the basement where there is the kitchen, the wine cellar and a room for use of the servants. A wide marble staircase gives access to the first floor, which is a large and richly decorated hall. The floors are of marquetry and the ceilings are sculptured. The two first floor rooms each have a monumental Gothic fireplace of gray marble and oak. The second floor was used as a bedroom of the imperial couple and has a small chapel with two beautiful stained glass windows. The upper floors were for the servants of higher rank, and the elliptical staircase inside the turret allows communication between all floors.

The tower is surrounded by a small square enclosure, surrounded by high walls and four cylindrical corner towers. The stone used in them is more modest and rough. Access to the site is by a single door in Gothic style.

== Sources ==
- "Castillo de la Emperatriz Eugenia de Montijo..." Eusko Jaurlaritza - Gobierno Vasco. 2001-04-26. Archived from the original on 2015-01-31.
- Chambers, William; Chambers, Robert (1879). Chamber's Journal of Popular Literature, Science and Arts. W & R Chambers.
- Fodor's (2012-11-15). Fodor's Spain 2013. Fodor's Travel Publications. ISBN 978-0-307-92946-4.
- Ford, Richard (1882). A handbook for travellers in spain. p. 194.
- Granger, Catherine (2005). L'Empereur et les arts: la liste civile de Napoléon III. Librairie Droz. ISBN 978-2-900791-71-4.
- Metcalfe, William Musham; Erskine, Ruaraidh (1890). "Summaries of Foreign Reviews: Spain". The Scottish Review. A. Gardner.
- Sacaze, Julien; Garrigou, Felix; Montgailhard, Marie Louis Desazars de (1891). Revue des Pyrënëes.
