= Théâtre Impérial de Compiègne =

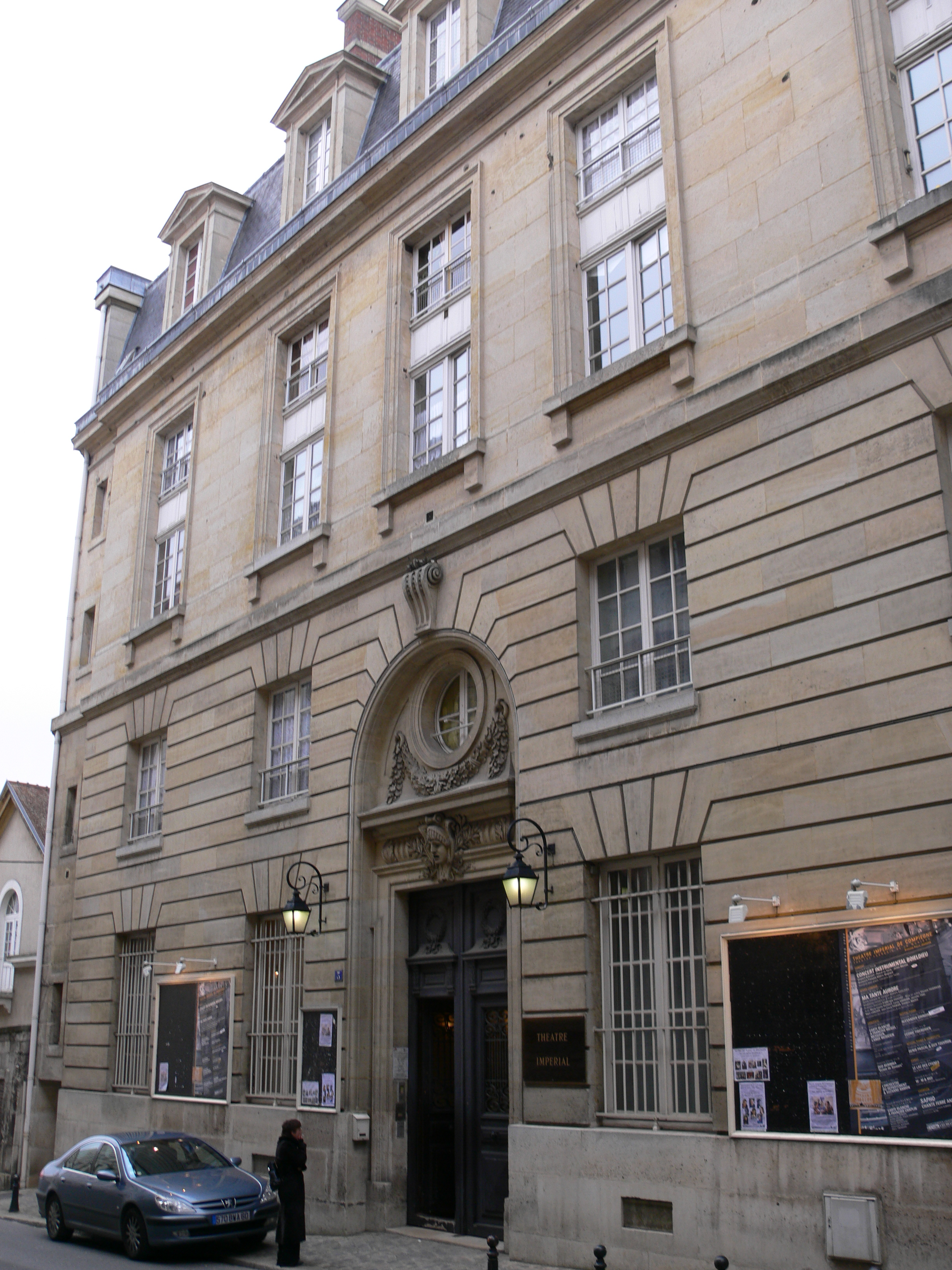
- Facade

- Location within France
- Address: Compiègne; France
- Coordinates: 49.419677°N 2.830406°E
- Capacity: 816

Construction
- Opened: 1991
- Architects: Gabriel-Auguste Ancelet, Renaud Bardon

Website
- www.theatre-imperial.com/fr/index.php

The Théâtre Impérial de Compiègne is a theater in Compiègne, France.

== Origins ==
The Emperor Napoleon III decided to construct a theater in Compiègne to entertain his court in 1866. He chose the location and the architect of the building, Gabriel-Auguste Ancelet. Work began in 1867 and went well until the outbreak of the 1870 Franco-Prussian War. The Battle of Sedan ruined the Empire and eliminated the possibility of completing the building on schedule. The walls were built, but the project for decorating the theater was suspended. The sculptures by Gustave Crauck were made on time, but the ceiling, which was to include paintings by Élie Delaunay, remained bare.

== Reconstruction ==
In 1987 the association for the Théâtre Impérial de Compiègne was created by Pierre Jourdan, who led the restoration program and the collection of funds to restore the building and make it a mecca for the operatic stage. A team of project managers and architects including Renaud Bardon started work in 1990 to complete the building, while another association under Pierre Jourdan was responsible for programming shows. The theater was officially opened in September 1991 with the opera Henry VIII by Camille Saint-Saëns.

== Later history ==
In December 2008, during the Extraordinary General Meeting held at the theater a little over a year after the death of Pierre Jourdan, the two associations were dissolved. On 6 March 2009 the new management was entrusted to Éric Rouchaud. The technical management was entrusted to Jean-Philippe Le Priol in 2008. On 21 September 2010, a plaque was placed in the atrium of the theater, recalling the memory of Pierre Jourdan now inseparable from the place.

== Building ==
The quality of the acoustics of the room comes from its design, built in the Italian style, and 90% wood. With the support of the sound insulation of the stage house and the transfer and amplification of sound through the wood, the reverberation gives the room excellent acoustic qualities, with low power requirements for acoustic, electric and electro-acoustic instruments. Heads of renowned orchestra have recognized the qualities of the room.

== Gallery ==
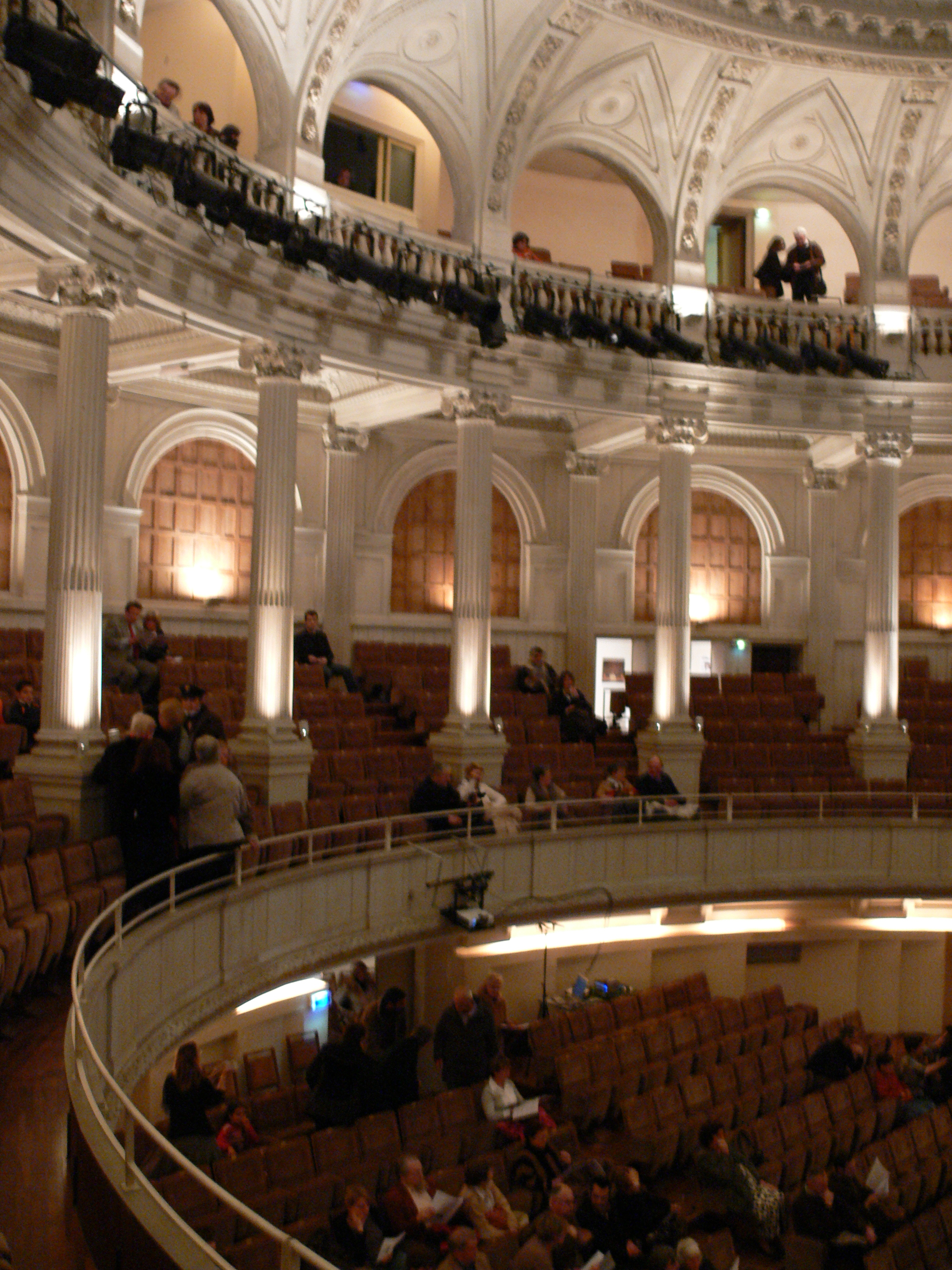

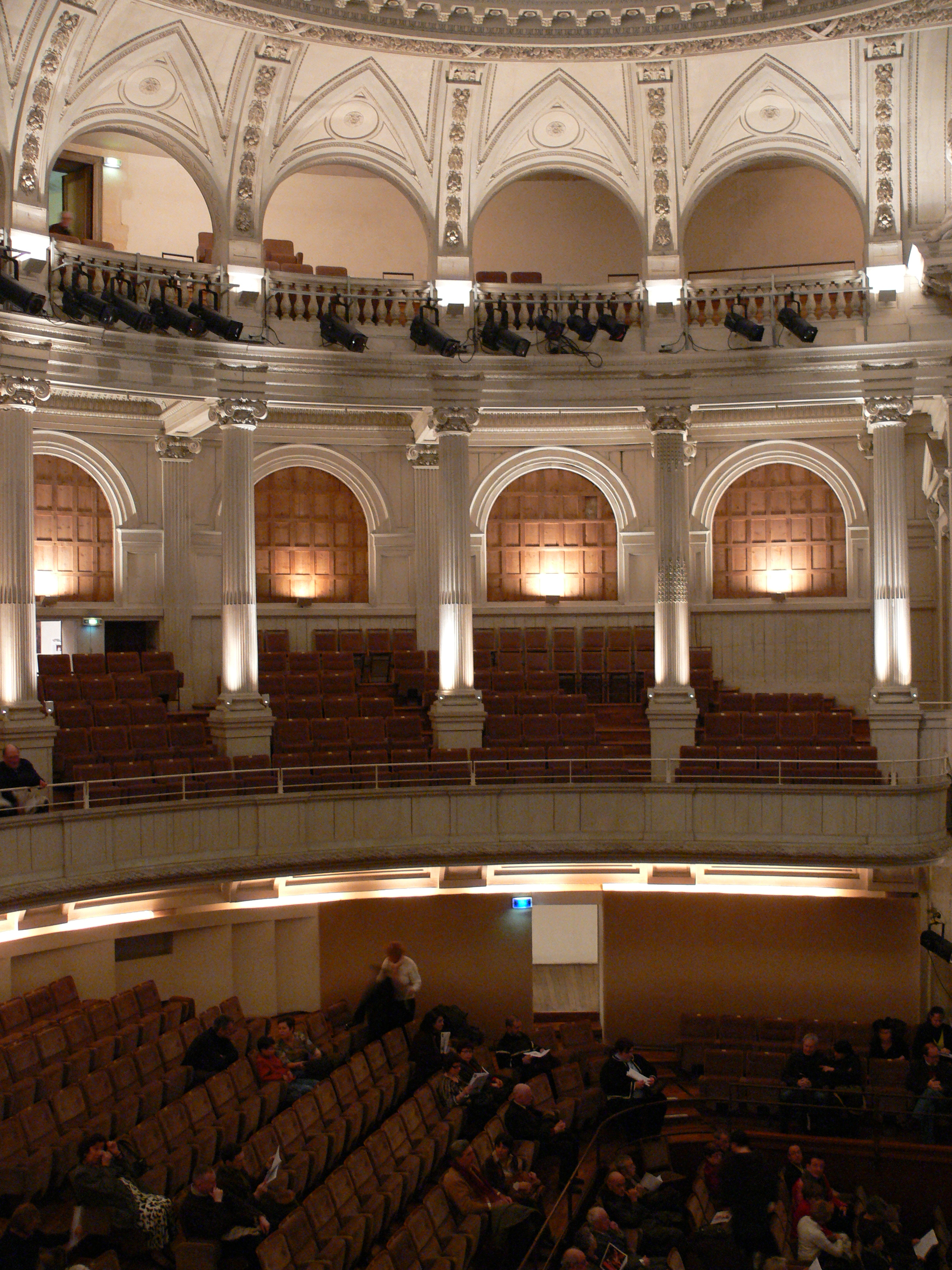

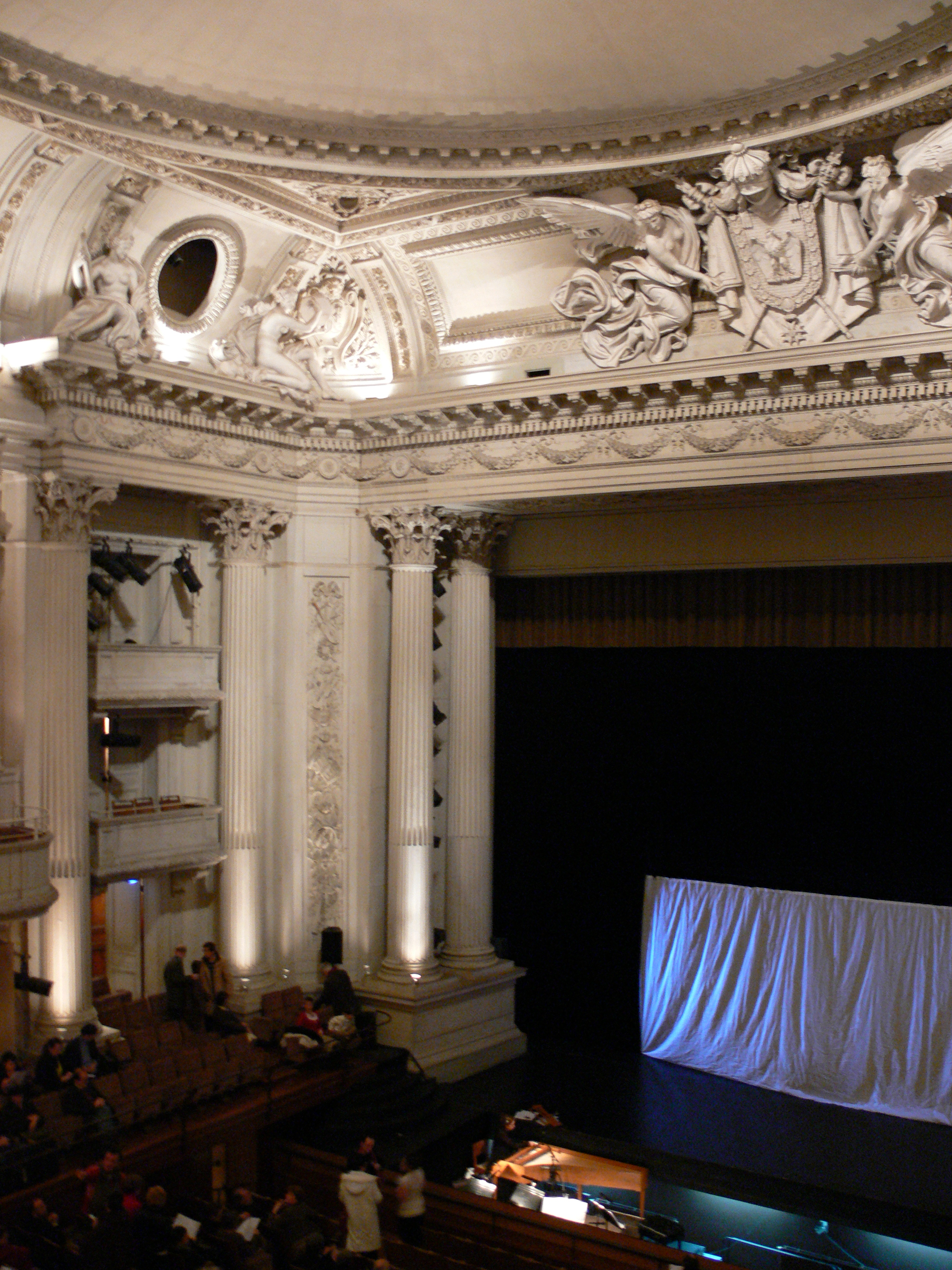
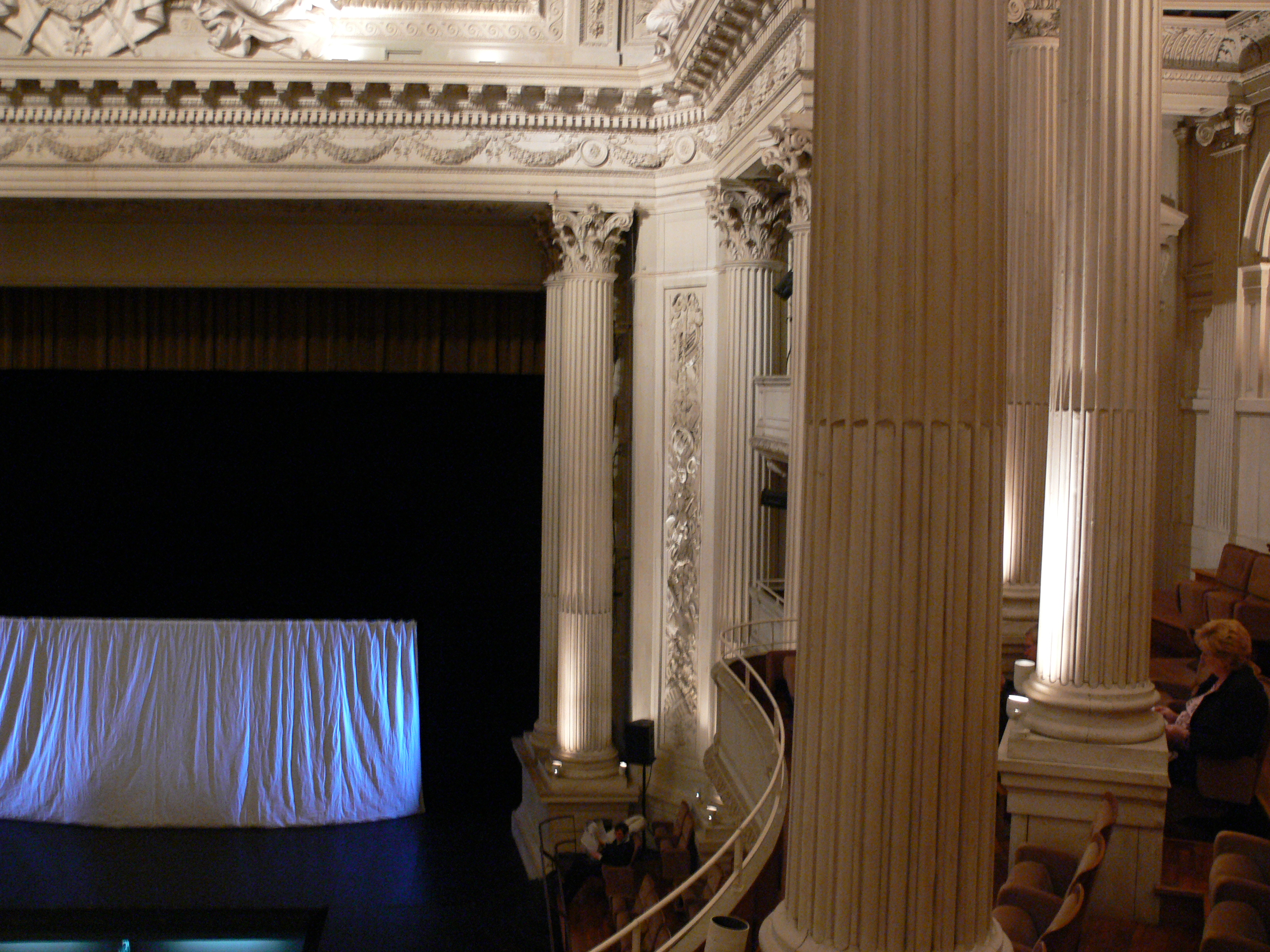

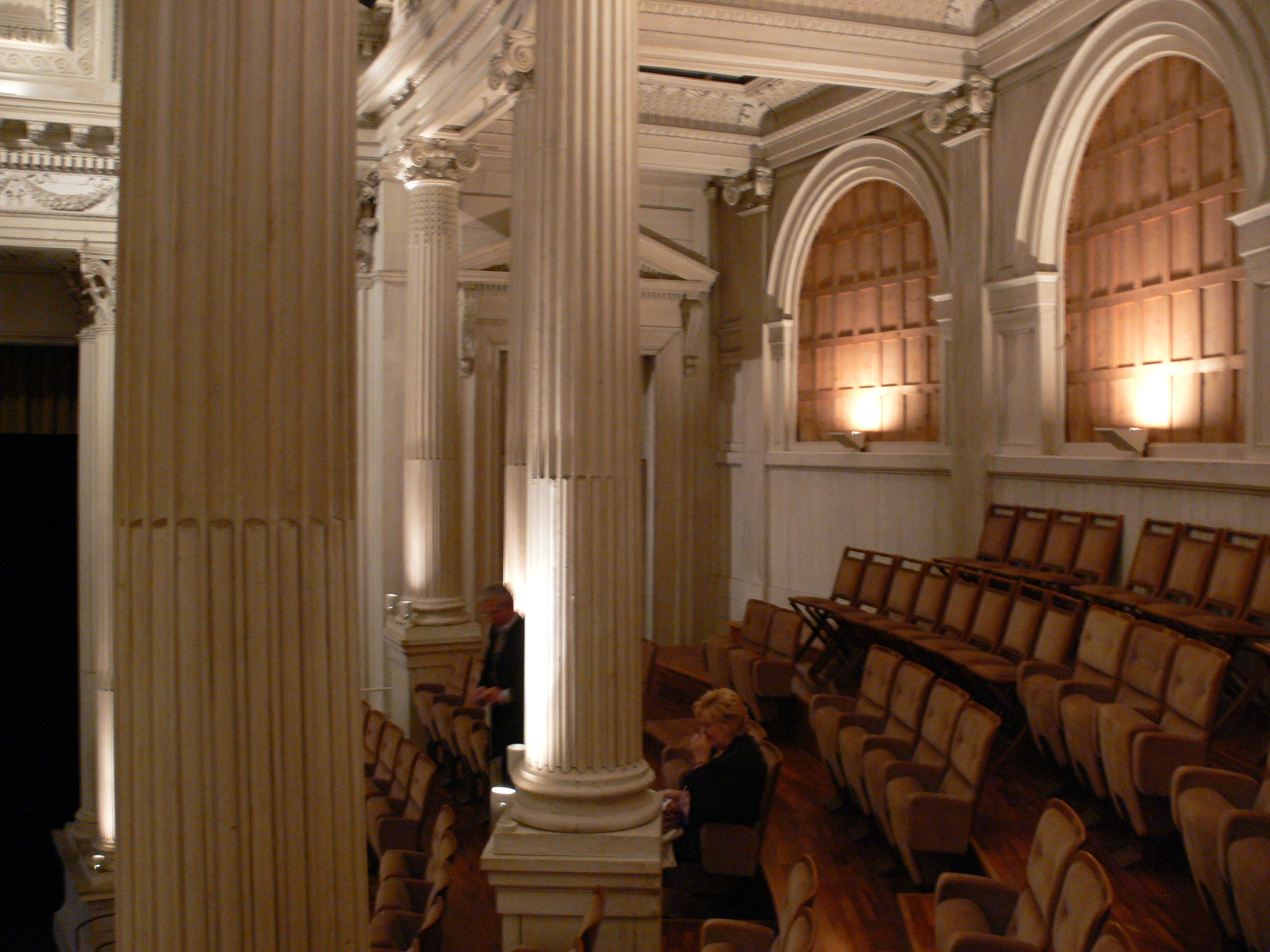

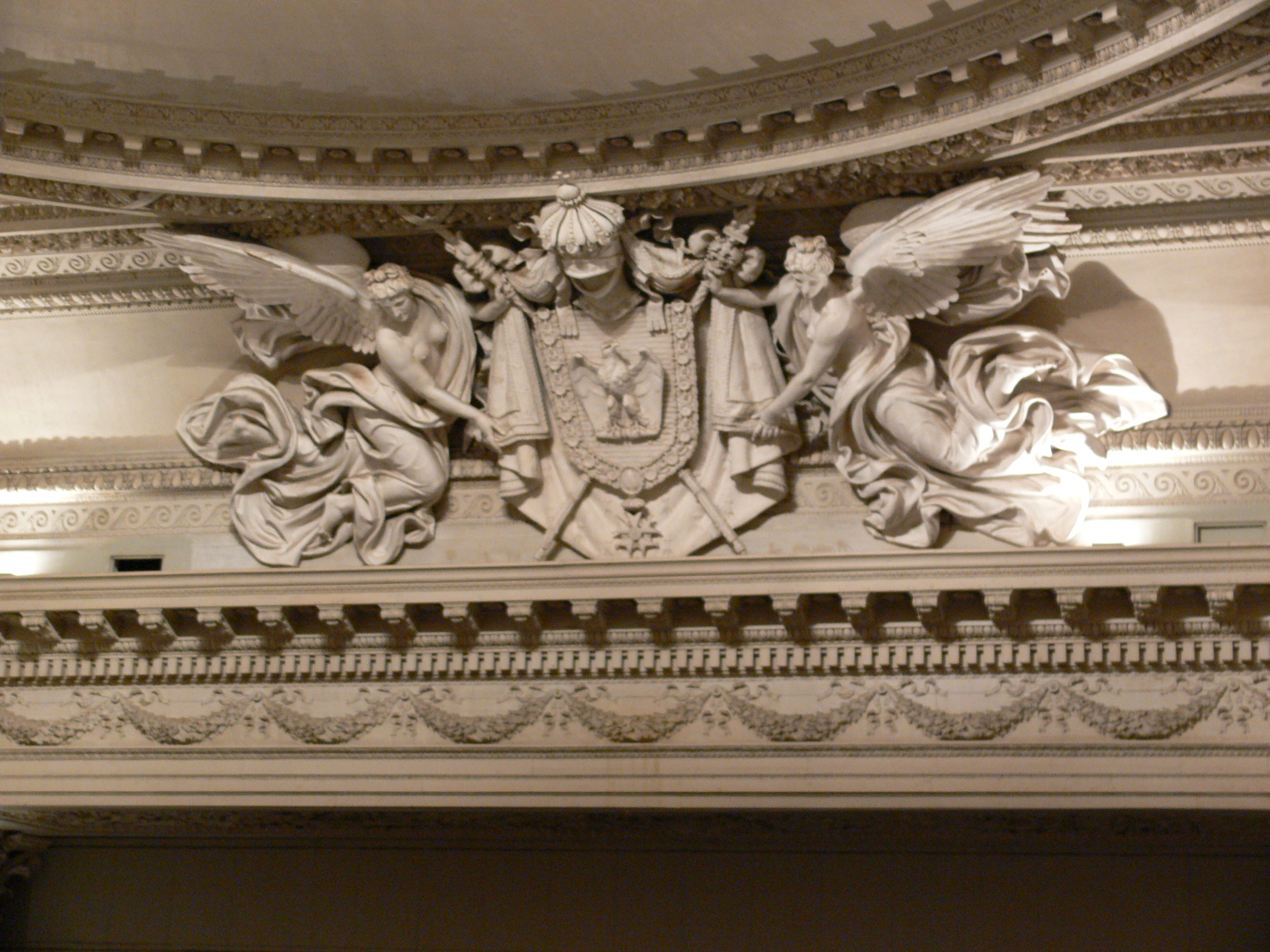

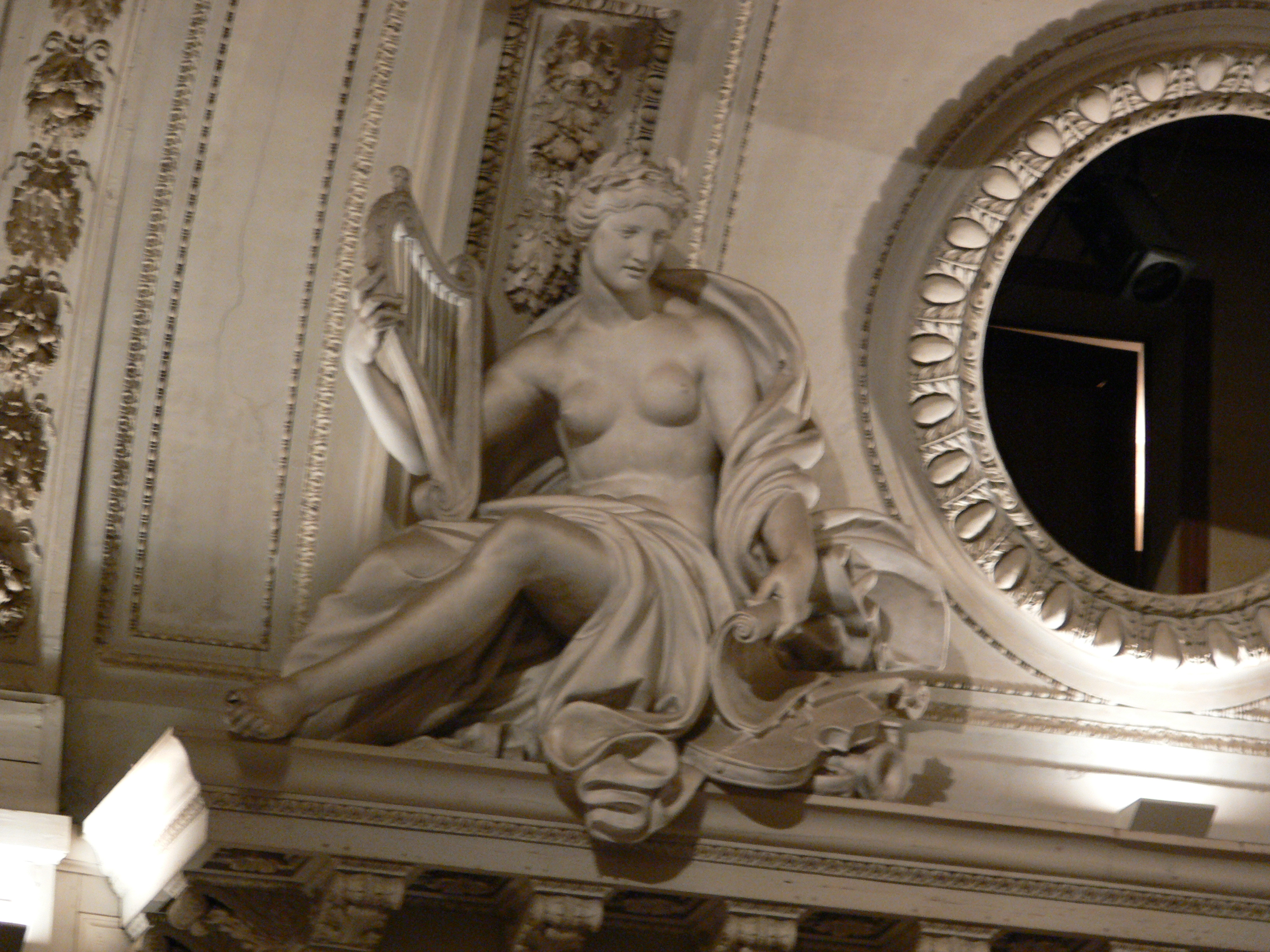

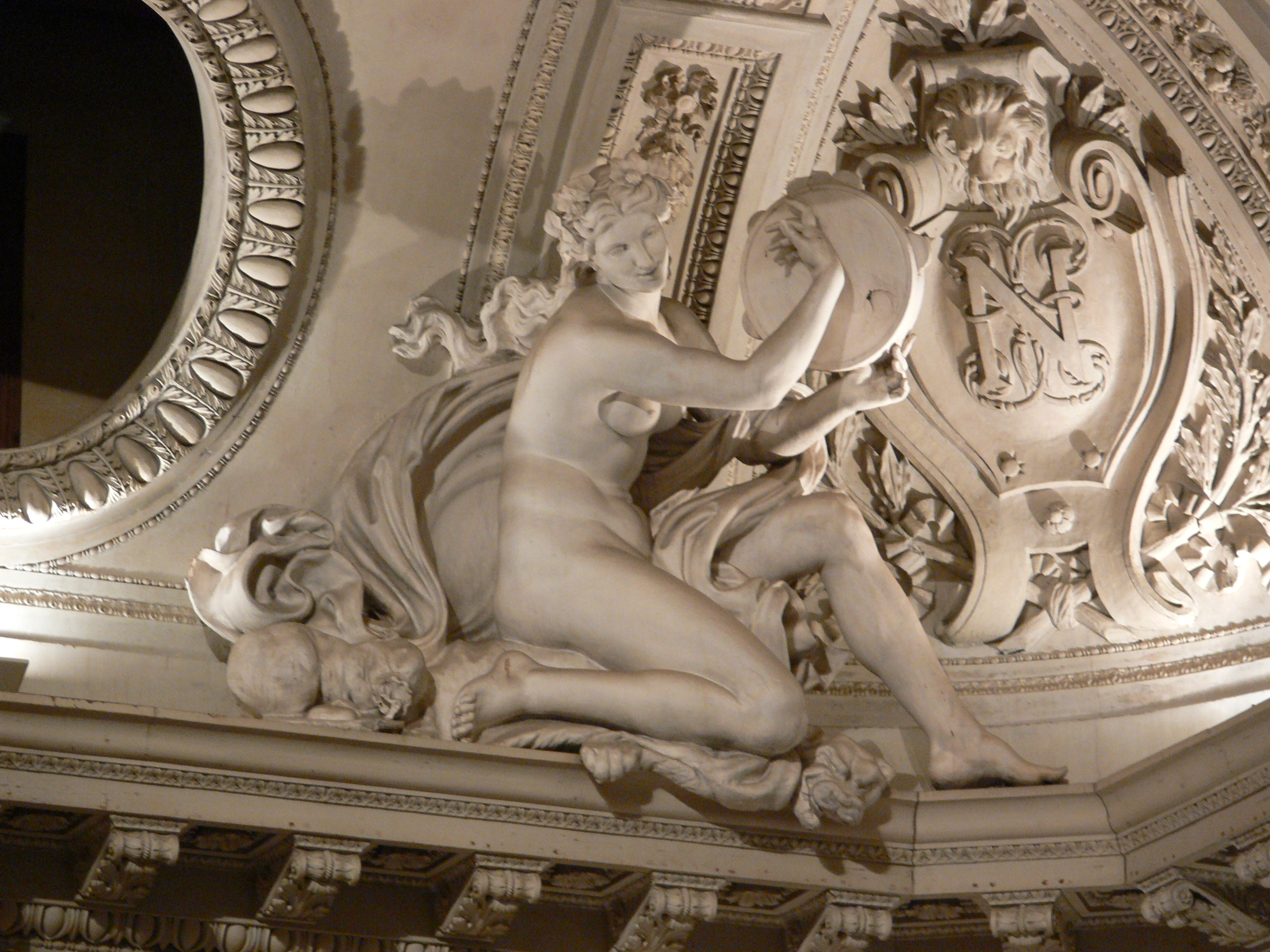
