= Alexandre-Dominique Denuelle =

French painter and architect

Alexandre-Dominique Denuelle (1818-1979) was a French decorative painter and architect.

He was born in Paris in 1818. He studied under Delaroche, and afterwards served on the Commission for Historical Monuments. He died at Florence in 1879. He was largely engaged in mural paintings for churches, and specimens of his art will be found in the Abbey of St. Denis, in St. Paul at Nîmes, St. Polycarp at Lyons, the Oratory at Birmingham, the Church of the Celestines at Avignon, and in Strassburg Cathedral. His work also appears in the richly decorated choir of the Church of Saint-Francis-Xavier in Paris.
