= Château de Pau =

Castle in Pau, France

Coordinates: 43°17′41″N 0°22′30″W

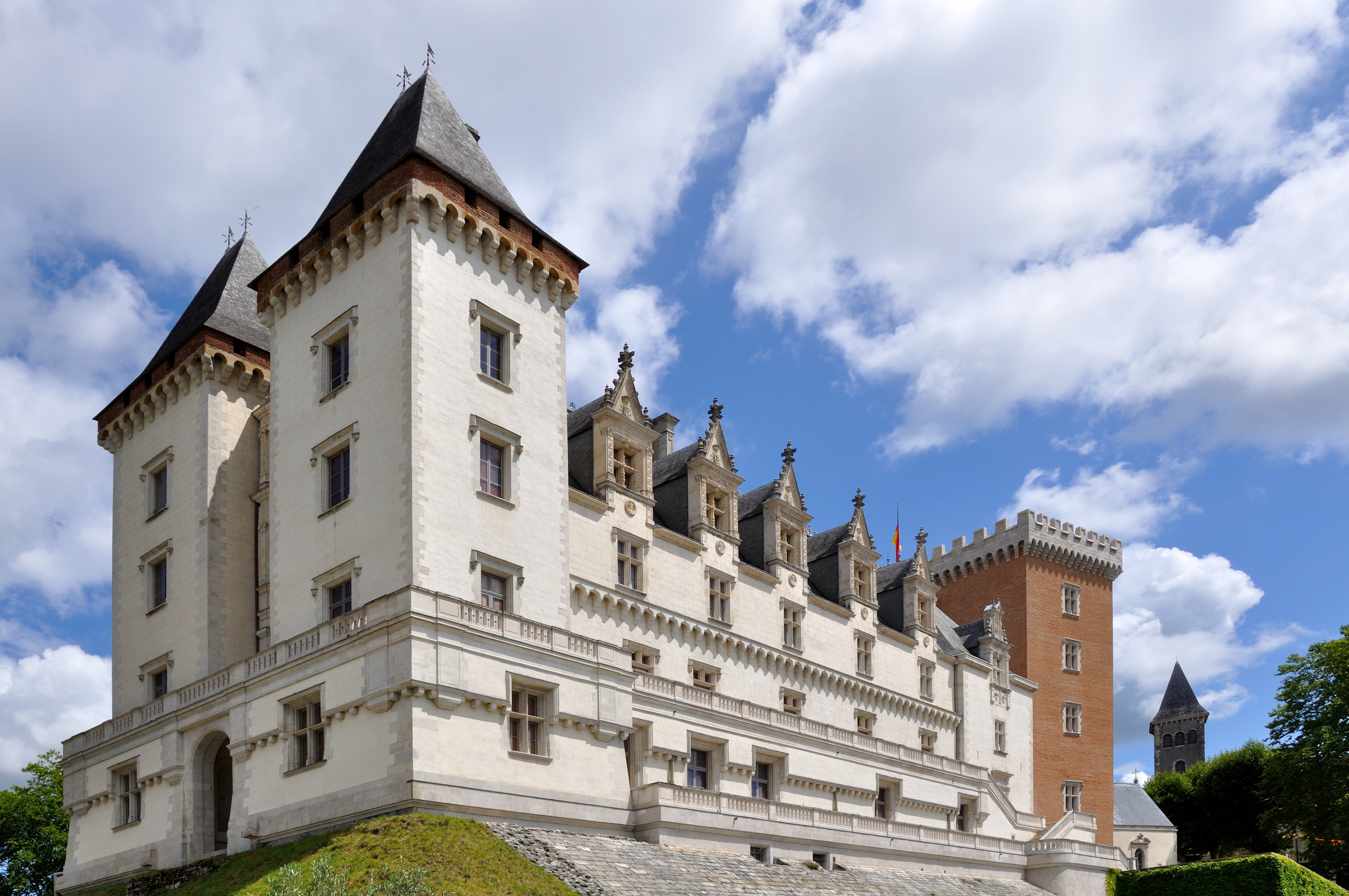
The Château de Pau

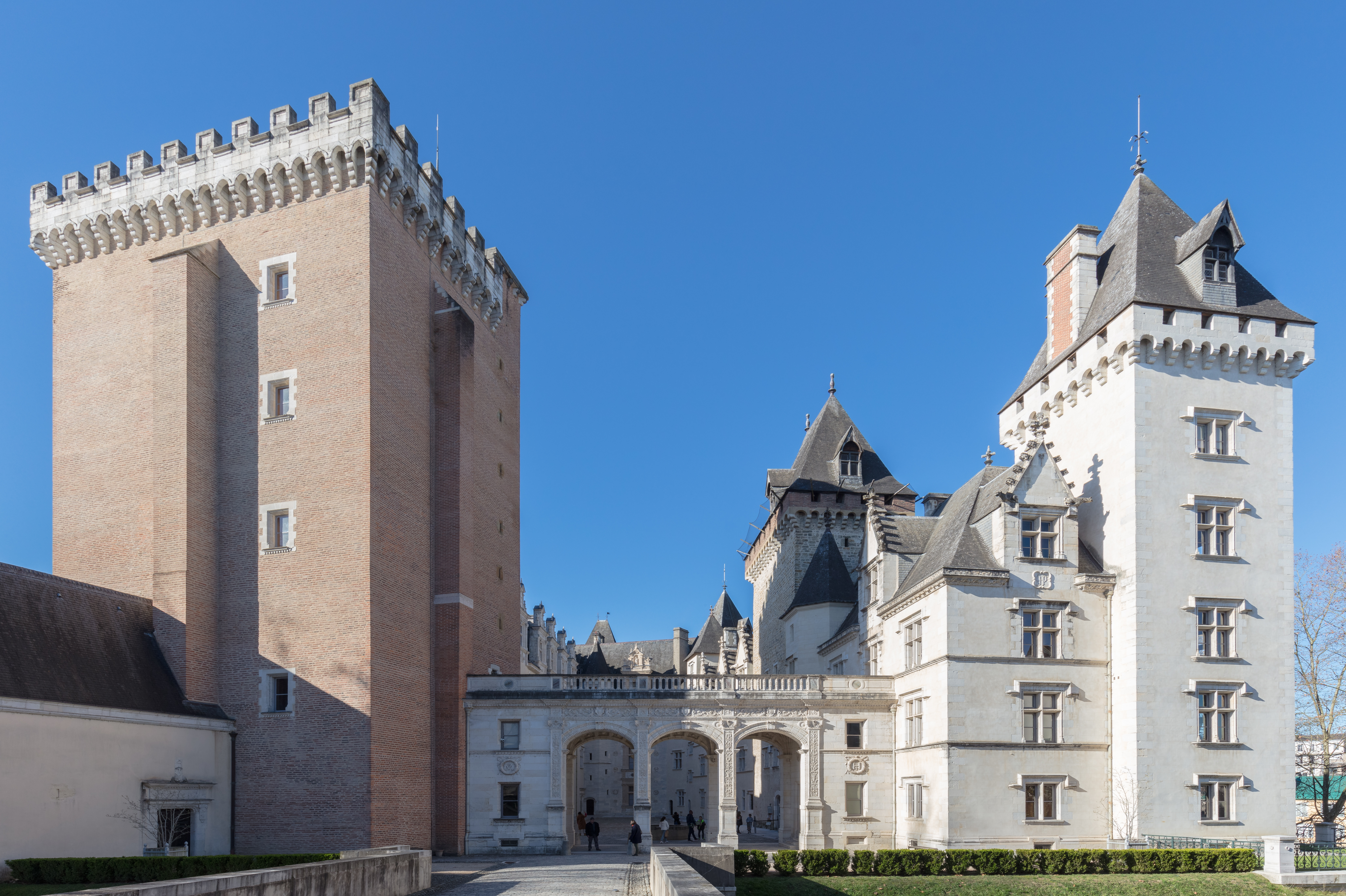
Entrance of the château

The Château de Pau (English: Pau Castle, Basque: Paueko gaztelua) is a castle in the centre of the city of Pau, the capital of Pyrénées-Atlantiques and Béarn. It dominates that quarter of the city.

Henry IV of France and Navarre was born here on December 13, 1553, and it was once used by Napoleon as a holiday home during his period of power.

The château has been classified as a Monument historique since 1840 by the French Ministry of Culture. Nowadays, as the Musée national du Château de Pau, it contains a collection of tapestries.

== History ==
=== Origins ===
Pau Castle was founded in the Middle Ages. First and foremost a military structure, it is a typical fortified castle built on top of the hill overlooking the Gave bounded by the Hédas ravine.

Since its construction, the castle has taken on a symbolic importance: possessing a stockade of piles (pau, in Béarnese), it designates, by metonymy, the city itself. These piles, symbolizing loyalty and righteousness, are each like axis mundi in a Béarnese version. In the twelfth century Gaston IV of Béarn built three towers at the fortress. They are called Mazères, Billère and Montauser.

=== Gaston Fébus ===
The fourteenth century was troublesome as the region was torn between the competing claims of the powerful warring enemy kingdoms of France and England. In contrast, the local lords sought to make Béarn united and independent, under a sovereign count. Such a man was the formidable Gaston III, Count of Foix, better known as Gaston Fébus (also spelt Phoebus). He greatly reinforced the fortress's defences and added a new 33-metre-high brick tower, defiantly inscribed in Béarnaise: "Febus me fe" (Fébus made me).

=== The Kings of Navarre ===
During the Renaissance, the installation of the court of Navarre in 1512 significantly altered the appearance of the castle. Originally a fortress, it now became a pleasure residence. Henry II of Navarre resided there with his wife Marguerite d'Angoulême, sister of Francis I, best known as Marguerite de Navarre, author of The Heptaméron. They marked the place with their initials, still present on the walls and ceilings, and great care was taken to maintain and reproduce the initials even over the subsequent restorations.

=== Henry IV ===
But their grandson gave the castle the fame it has today: not by any architectural endeavor, nor even by his own will. The future Henry IV was born in it on December 13, 1553, and the story did the rest. The fame of the King, baby boy cradled in a turtle shell preserved by Béarn through the vicissitudes of revolutions, gives the castle, which did not see him grow up or die, a particular taste, and the right to claim the honor due those who give birth to supermen. But the real recognition of the King is posthumous, and the castle that he was born in was soon forgotten, except to unite Navarre and Béarn with the Kingdom of France (for which Louis XIII signed the treaty in 1620).

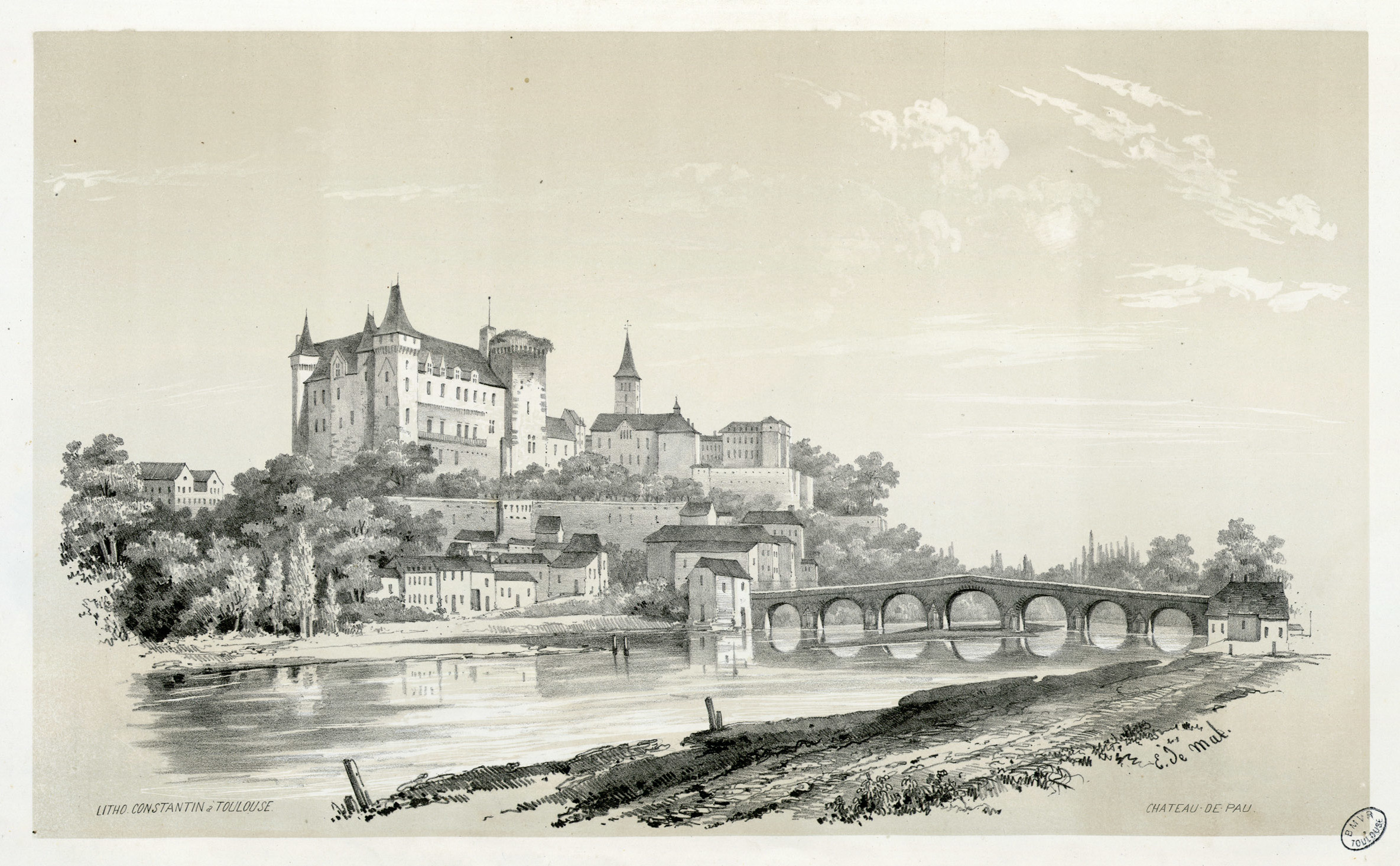
The castle in 1843, by the French romantic painter Eugène de Malbos.

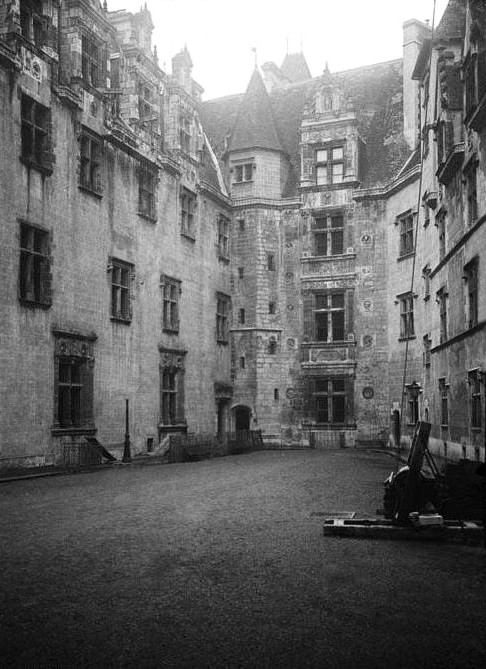
Courtyard of the château in 1905, by the Catalan photographer Josep Salvany i Blanch.

=== The restoration ===
Louis-Philippe, who would combine the ideals of the Revolution and those of the monarchy, had the idea of restoring the castle of the man who reconciled Catholic and Protestant into a royal residence.

The castle was a gilded prison in 1848 for the emir Abd El-Kader, conquered by France in Algeria. In order that this castle should retain its character, Henricians placed there many neo-Renaissance and neo-Gothic objects, and a collection of tapestries (16th - 19th century), to recall the halcyon days of the good king. Louis-Philippe, in exile in England, could never stay at this place which was visited by Napoleon III. It is the Renaissance portal through which one enters and which bears the initials of the royal couple of Navarre, founder of the modern castle.

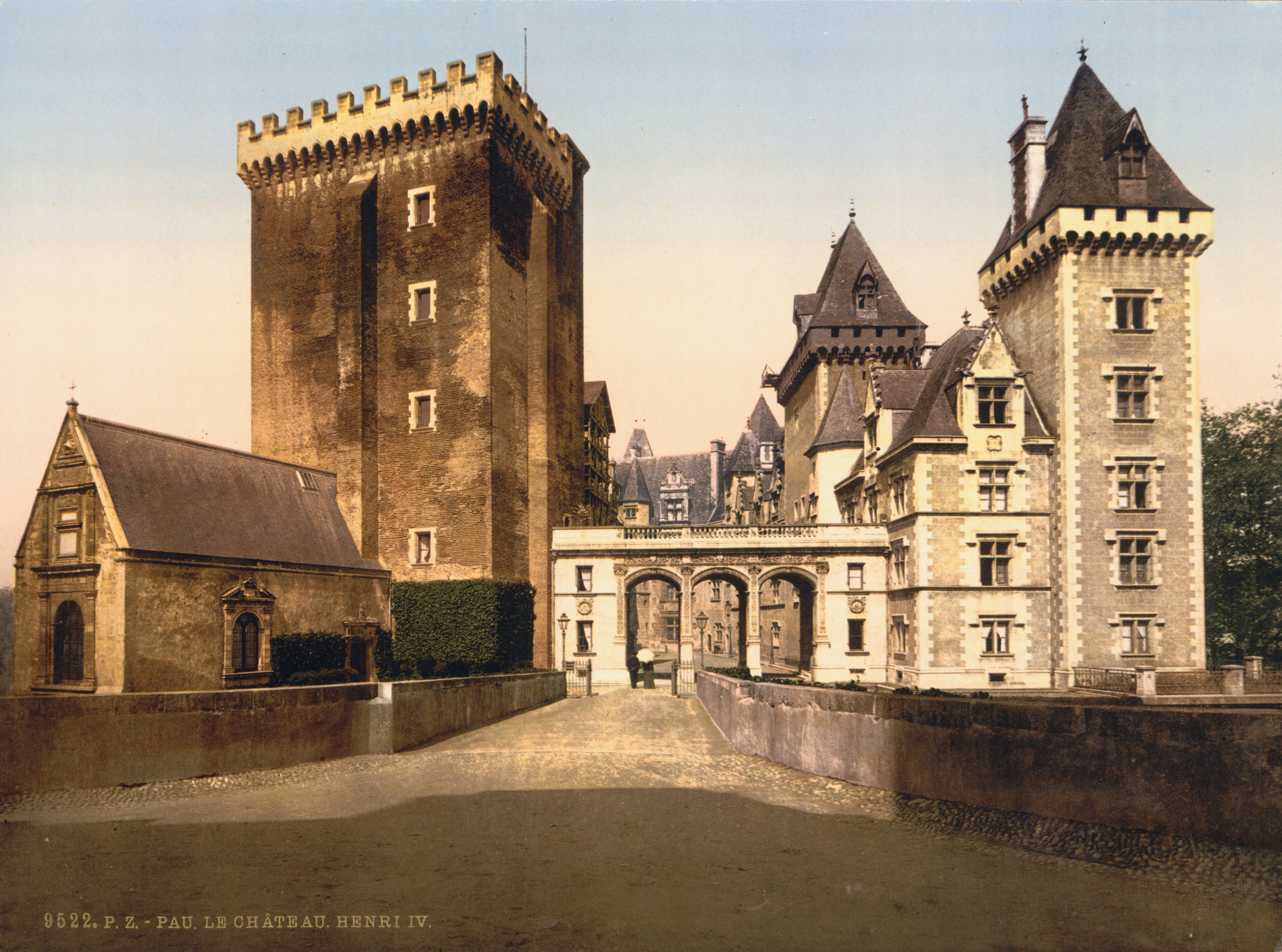
The château from the east front, 1890–1900

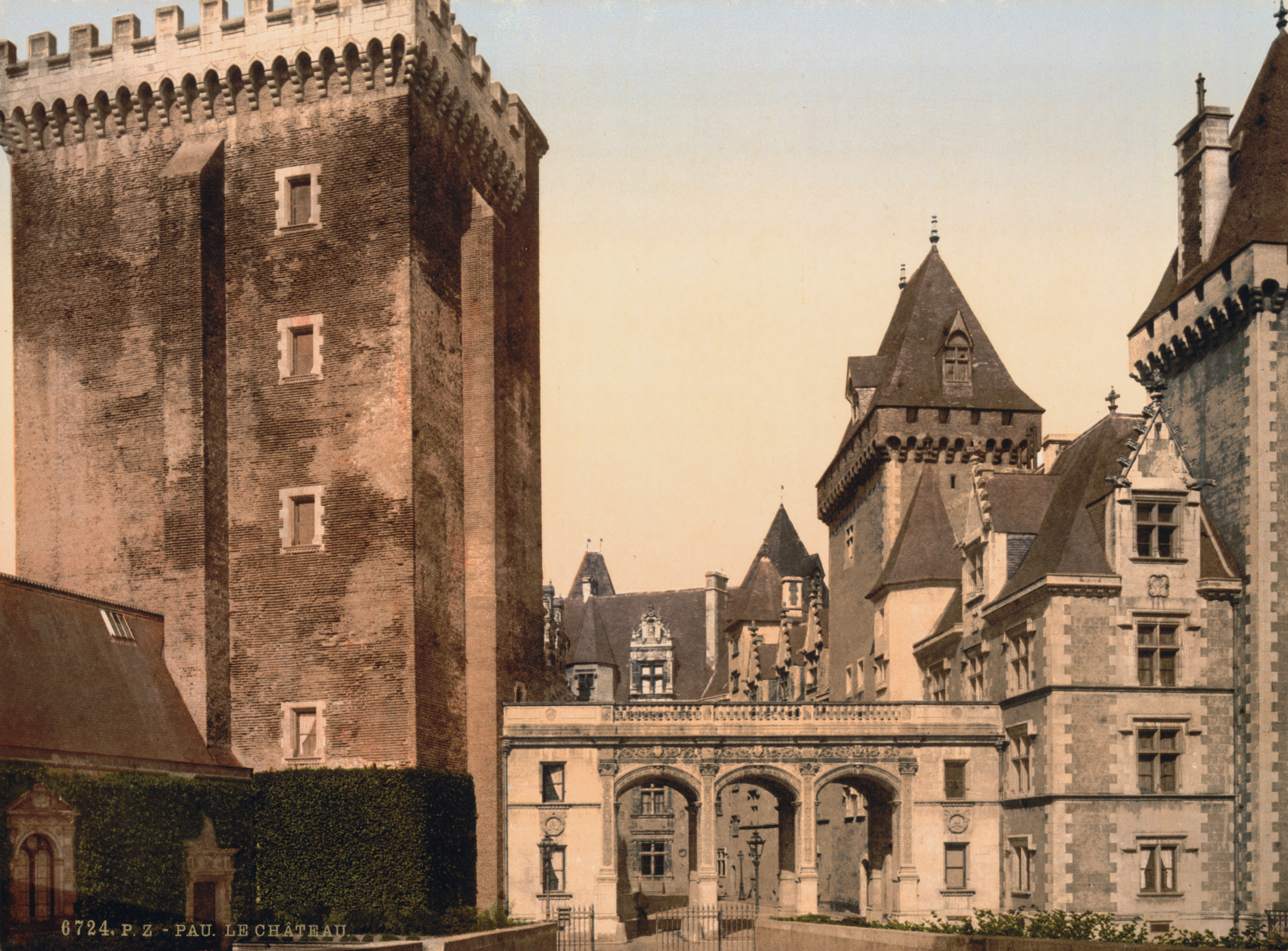
The château from the east front, 1890–1900

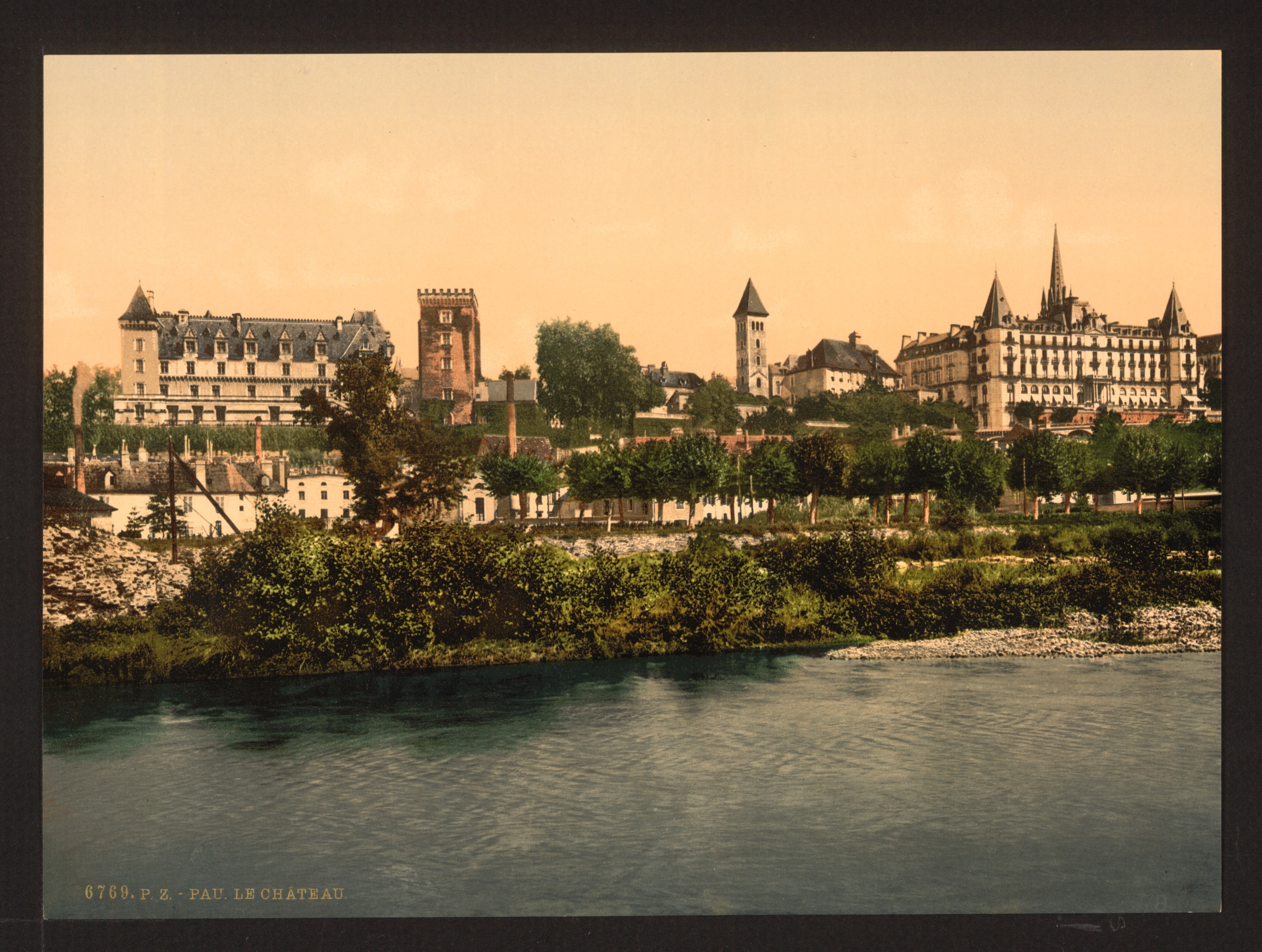
The château from the south front, 1890–1900

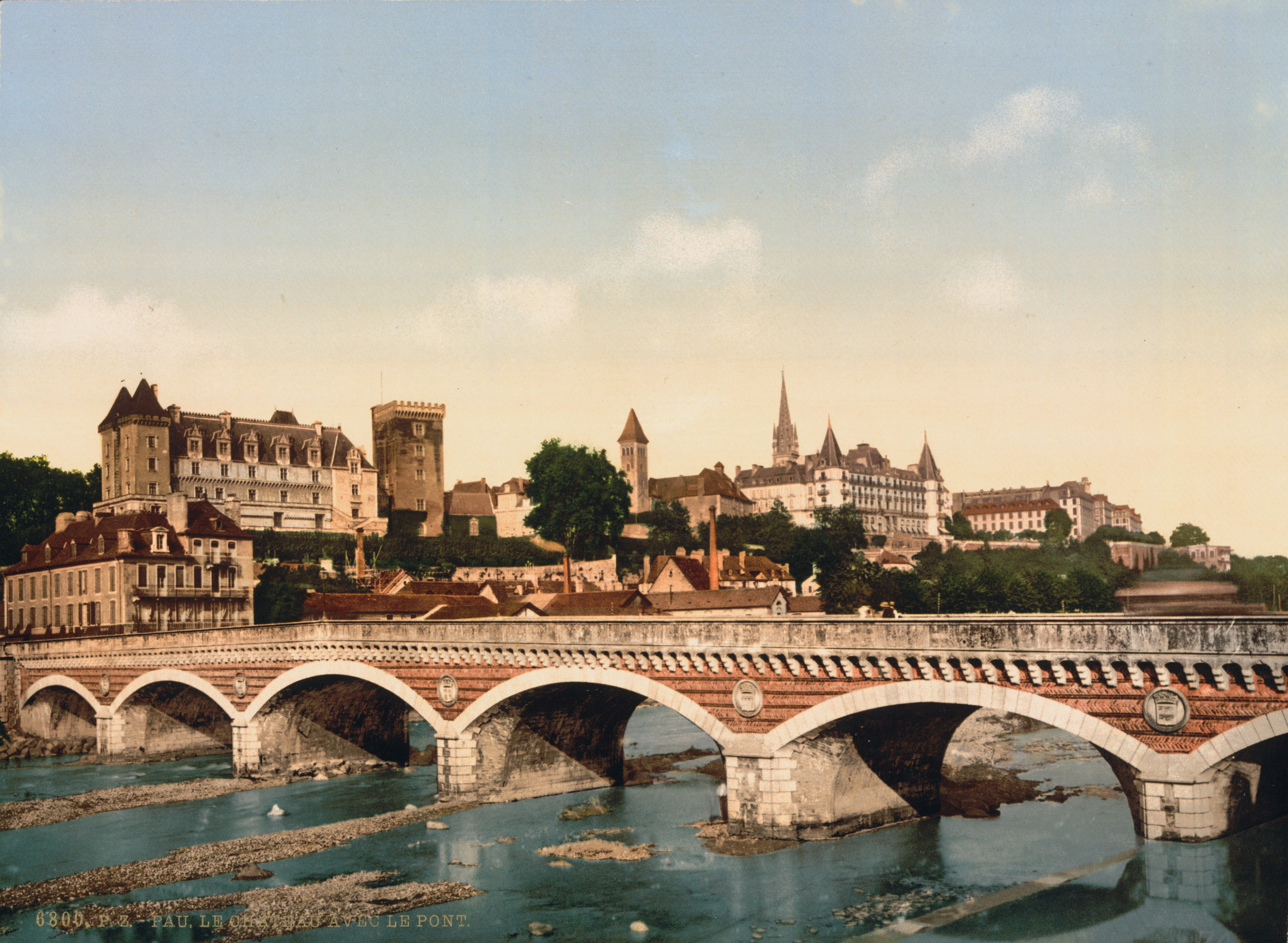
The château and bridge, 1890–1900

=== The national museum ===
Then the castle became a presidential residence in the Republic. It is currently a national museum which houses the works preserved from the days of Henry IV and especially during the restoration made by Louis-Philippe. The collections are increasing every year around the Henrician theme. It currently hosts over 100,000 visitors annually, making it the most visited heritage site of the French department of Pyrénées-Atlantiques.

== See also ==
- List of castles in France
