= Mary Dinah =

- Born: Lagos, Nigeria
- Education: University of Oxford Saïd Business School; Harvard University; University of Nottingham; University of Surrey; United Nations Institute for Training and Research (UNITAR)
- Occupations: Hotelier; Social Entrepreneur; Human Rights Activist; Philanthropist; Humanitarian
- Website: marydinahfoundation.org

Mary Dinah is a hotelier, social entrepreneur, humanitarian and human rights activist. She is the founder and CEO of the Mary Dinah Foundation. She is also the founder and managing director of M.A.D Hospitality, a London-based hospitality consulting firm.

== Early life ==
Dinah was born in Nigeria. She grew up in Lagos and Paris, before moving to England at the age of 14. She received her early education from the British School of Paris and St Saviour’s Primary School, Ikoyi, Lagos. During her high school years in Notting Hill, London, she was spotted by a modeling agency and modeled in fashion and beauty.

== Education ==
Dinah holds a BSc in Computer Science from the University of Nottingham. She earned her MSc in International Hotel Management from the University of Surrey with distinction. Subsequently, she obtained a Diploma in Global Business with Distinction from the University of Oxford Saïd Business School and studied Entrepreneurship at Harvard University.

Dinah is a United Nations Fellow and has acquired a postgraduate degree from the United Nations Institute of Training and Research (UNITAR) in Geneva, Switzerland. In 2018, she studied Advanced Leadership and Public Policy at Judge Business School at the University of Cambridge.

== Career ==
Dinah is a hotelier who has worked with various hotel chains including Hilton, Marriott, Four Seasons, Le Meridien, Sheraton and Starwood hotels.

Dinah founded M.A.D Hospitality in 2008, a London-based hospitality consulting firm which provides boutique hotel management and service training. The company has since expanded and diversified into corporate hotel bookings. She has also worked with Yoko, a London-based luxury fashion jeweler.

== Humanitarian work ==
Dinah is the founder and chief executive officer of the Mary Dinah Foundation, an international non-profit organization addressing food security and malnutrition across West and Central Africa, aligning with the United Nations Sustainable Development Goal of Zero Hunger. Through its Zero Hunger Program, the Foundation provides emergency food relief to refugees and internally displaced persons (IDPs) living in crisis zones and regions affected by war and terrorism. To date, the Foundation has distributed over 42 million meals and nutritional supplements, primarily pregnant and lactating women, and infants under two years of age. The foundation's activities include access to healthcare, raising awareness about gender-based violence, education on water and sanitation hygiene, and infant and child feeding practices. Mary Dinah Foundation started in 2006 in East London, with a mission to assist in the rehabilitation of women in need of shelter and struggling with various addictions. Subsequently, it expanded its operations to Nigeria, where it started providing meals to girls in public schools in Lagos.

In 2014, Dinah established Job-Link, Nigeria's first Job Centre, which connected over 10,000 youths to work and created an employability training program, training 3,000 people on employability skills, and administering over 2,000 CV clinics. Through her work with Job-Link, she established a career counseling service for women known as the Power of Women Association (P.O.W.A.) in collaboration with the State Ministry of Women's Affairs. P.O.W.A. works to support victims of sexual harassment and gathers data to lobby the Nigerian Senate to pass appropriate bills into law which protect women.

In 2023, the Mary Dinah Scholarship for Refugees was launched in Cameroon enabling refugees to pursue higher education at universities.

== Honors and awards ==
Dinah is a United Nations Fellow. She has been a recipient of international awards including the British Council Social Impact Award; British High Commission Future Leaders Award; Vice Chancellors Award at University of Surrey; Lagos State Governor’s Award for Impact; and the University of Nottingham Special Achievement Award. She was listed among MIPAD – Most Influential People of African Descent Global Top 100 under 40. She has also been honored with the Marriott Golden Circle Award for her contributions to revenue generation at the Marriott London.
