= Jacques Taurin de Lormand =

French politician and Banker

Jacques Taurin de Lormand (born 4 September 1762 in Bayonne — 24 January 1847 in Bayonne) was a French politician and banker.

== Biography ==
He was a councillor in the Parliament of Pau under the Old Regime. After the Second Bourbon Restoration, he was a deputy of Basses-Pyrénées from 1815 to 1819, sitting within the majority of the Unobtainable Chamber. He worked as a banker. He made a colossal bequest of 5 million francs to the Bayonne town council for different works, including the construction of St. Andrew's Church. The church was built between 1856 and 1869 by architects Hippolyte Durand and Hippolyte Guichenné.

== Bibliography ==
- "Jacques Taurin de Lormand", in Adolphe Robert and Gaston Cougny, Dictionnaire des parlementaires français (1789–1891), Bourloton, Paris, 1889 Edition details Wikisource
