= Joseph-Ermend Bonnal =

French composer and organist

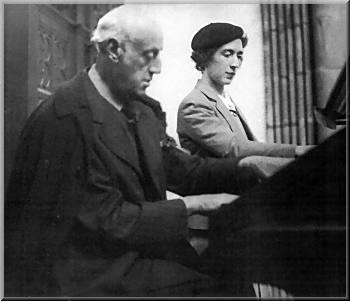
- Bonnal at the organ of St-Andre in Bayonne (1933)
- Born: 1 July 1880; Bordeaux, France
- Died: 14 August 1944 (aged 64); Bordeaux
- Occupations: Classical composer; Classical organist

Joseph-Ermend Bonnal (1 July 1880 – 14 August 1944; also Ermend-Bonnal, alias Guy Marylis) was a French composer and organist.

Ermend-Bonnal received initial musical instruction from his father, a violinist. He then studied piano at the Conservatoire de Paris under Charles-Wilfrid de Bériot, harmony under Antoine Taudou, composition under Gabriel Fauré and organ under Alexandre Guilmant and Louis Vierne. He also assisted Charles-Marie Widor at Saint-Sulpice, Albert Périlhou at Saint-Séverin and Charles Tournemire at the Basilica of St. Clotilde.

In 1901, Ermend-Bonnal was appointed Organist at Saint-Médard, and subsequently at Notre Dame in Boulogne-sur-Seine. In 1920, he was offered a professorship in organ at the University of Strasbourg. However, he decided instead to accept a position as director of the Bayonne Conservatory, which he held until 1941. His most famous student was the composer Maurice Ohana. In 1942, he succeeded his teacher Tournemire at the Cavaillé-Coll Organ at Basilica of St. Clotilde.

The focus of Ermend-Bonnal's musical output is organ music (Paysages Euskariens, 1930; Media Vita, organ symphony, 1932). However, he also wrote in all other musical genres, ranging from children's pieces for piano to symphonies. Of his chamber music, two string quartets and a string trio especially deserve mention. He also wrote Ragtimes, One Steps and Tangos under the pseudonym Guy Marylis.

Ermend-Bonnal had six children. Children that are still living today are Marylis Raoul-Duval, the eldest; Mayette Bonnal, and Francoise Bonnal, the youngest. Palay, Rataboul are some of the successors today.
