= Cédric Pemba-Marine =

French politician (born 1983)

Mayor of Le Port-Marly
- In office 2020–2026

Municipal councillor for Le Port-Marly
- Incumbent
- Assumed office 2008

Personal details
- Born: December 16, 1983
- Party: Democratic Movement
- Occupation: Politician

Cédric Pemba-Marine (born 16 December 1983 in Hauts-de-Seine), is a French politician and mayor of Le Port-Marly in Yvelines, succeeding Marcelle Gorgues.

== Biography ==
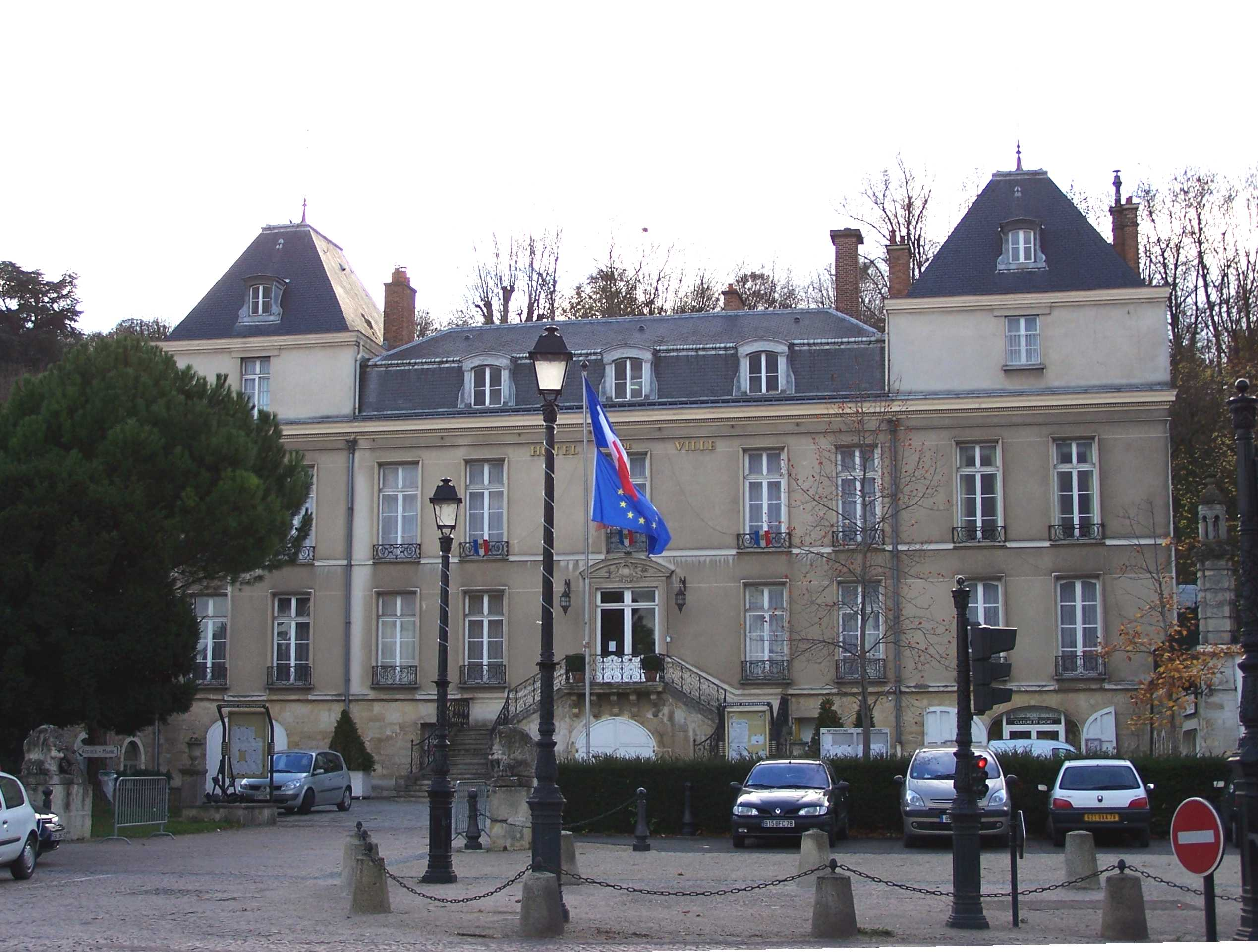
Port-Marly Town Hall

Son of Rita Marine and grandson of Armand Marine, originally from Gros-Morne (Martinique), Cédric Pemba-Marine became involved in politics in the run-up to the 2007 French presidential election. He became a municipal councillor in 2008, at the age of 24, and was entrusted with a sports delegation to carry out equipment projects and revitalise the sports policy in the commune of Port-Marly. He was then appointed deputy delegate for education and youth. A senior civil servant since 2010, he is a centre-ground politician, and a member of Democratic Movement (Modem). Parliamentary attaché to Bruno Millienne from 2017, he won the 2020 municipal elections, succeeding Marcelle Gorgues, who had decided not to stand for re-election after 16 years at the head of Port-Marly. Elected at 36, he is one of the youngest mayors in the department.
