= British School of Paris =

The British School of Paris

Address
- 38 Quai de l'Ecluse; Croissy-sur-Seine 78290; France
- Coordinates: 48°52′26.64″N 2°7′40.61″E

Information
- Type: Private school
- Founded: 1954
- Founder: Mary J. Cosyn
- Department for Education URN: 137590 Tables
- Head teacher: Nicholas Hammond
- Years taught: 3–18
- Enrollment: c. 600
- School fees: Between €19,126 (Nursery) and €31,498 (Sixth Form)
- Website: www.britishschool.fr

The British School of Paris (BSP) is a coeducational private day school in Croissy-sur-Seine, France, in Paris' western suburbs.

Numbering approximately 600 pupils aged between 3 and 18, it is the only British School Overseas in France accredited by the UK Government. In the 2023–24 academic year, annual fees ranged from €19,126 in Nursery to €31,498 in Sixth Form.

== History ==
Mary Cosyn founded the English School of Paris in 1954. The school was located in the Château de Monte-Cristo in Le Port-Marly. Most pupils were British, American, and Canadian, whose parents were employed by the Supreme Headquarters of the Allied Powers in Europe. From 1959, the honorary patron of the school has been the British Ambassador to France.

In 1964, the school moved to its present site in Croissy-sur-Seine, across the River Seine from the Château de Monte-Cristo. In 1973, the Junior School moved to a new campus in Bougival, south of the Seine.

In 1981, the school was renamed to the British School of Paris. In 1986, a Swedish section of the Junior School was opened. The science bloc was unveiled by Princess Diana in 1988, and inaugurated by Francis Tombs in 1989. Its sports hall was inaugurated by Roger Bannister in 1994.

In 2002, the school opened a new junior school in Croissy-sur-Seine. The Bougival campus was resited to purpose-built premises adjacent to the senior school, which were inaugurated by the Duchess of Gloucester in 2010.

== Organisation ==
The BSP offers education from ages 3 to 18. As of October 2022, the school numbered 586 pupils: 27 in the Early Years Foundation Stage, 218 in the Junior School, 267 in the Senior School, and 74 in the Sixth Form. The average pupil stays at the BSP for three years: though there are some pupils whose families are permanently resident in France, most are internationally mobile.

The school has two adjacent campuses. The Junior School contains 35 classrooms in a 7,300-square-metre (79,000-square-foot) area.

Since 1980, the BSP has been a non-profit organisation under French law, exempted from the state curriculum by the Académie de Versailles. The school follows the National Curriculum for England, and offers GCSE and A-level examinations.

The BSP is the only British School Overseas in France accredited by the UK Government. It is inspected by the Independent Schools Inspectorate.

== Notable alumni ==
- Shawkat Toorawa (born 1963), scholar of Arabic literature

== See also ==
- Lycée Français Charles de Gaulle
- Lycée International de Londres Winston Churchill
