= Jean Chanorier =

French politician (1746–1806)

French legislator

Personal details
- Born: 16 November 1746 Lyon
- Died: 29 May 1806 (aged 59) Croissy-sur-Seine

Jean Chanorier (16 November 1746, Lyon – 29 May 1806, Croissy-sur-Seine), was a French agronomist and politician. Lord and then mayor of Croissy-sur-Seine, he was a legislator, then general councilor for Seine-et-Oise and associate member of the Institut of France.

He is best known for introducing the Merino sheep breed to France. His friendship with Joséphine de Beauharnais earned him government protection under the consulate, and his election to the Institut.

== Biography ==
=== Lord of Croissy ===
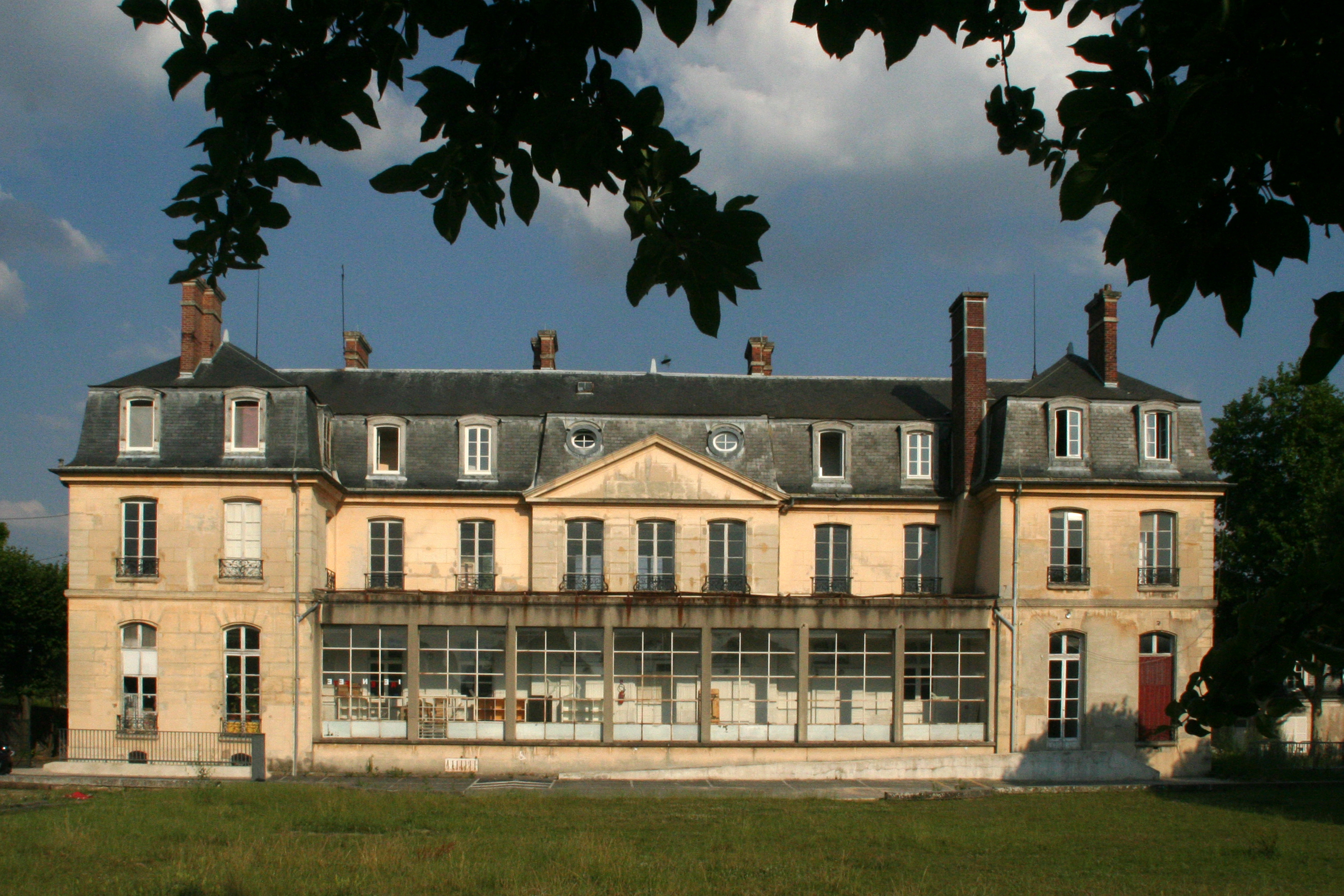
The garden facade of Croissy castle, the residence from 1779 of Jean Chanorier, the last lord and first mayor of Croissy

Jean Chanorier was the only son of Hugues Eustache Chanorier (d. 1769), an equerry, King's secretary, collector of taxes for the election of Lyon, then former general collector of finances for the region of Auch, and his wife Jeanne Marie Philippe Pollet. His grandfather Eustache Chanorier, who had renounced the right of bourgeoisie in Lyon in 1702, was judge and mayor of Cluny, lieutenant of the election and representative of the Third estate, as well as procurator for the abbot at the Hôtel-Dieu de Tournus in 1704. Jean Chanorier therefore belonged to a wealthy bourgeois family on the road to ennoblement.

In 1771 he succeeded his father as Receiver General of Finances, a position he retained (despite its temporary abolition by Necker in 1780), until he sold it in 1789. In 1779, he purchased the seigneury of Croissy-sur-Seine from the Prince de Condé for the sum of 198,160 pounds. His estate covers almost 40 hectares of Croissy alone, more than 20% of the commune's surface area. It includes a castle built in 1754 for Gautier de Beauvais. This classical-style manor house is still known today as Château Chanorier (Chanorier castle).

In 1781 he commissioned surveyor René Phelipeau to draw up an urbarium of the land to help him understand his estate and make the most of it. He soon befriended his neighbor Henri Bertin, former Controller-General of Finances and owner of the Chatou seigneury estate, who shared his ideas on agronomy. In addition to Chanorier castle, Jean Chanorier kept his Paris home on rue Neuve-du-Luxembourg, where he entertained Benjamin Franklin and his son. He also frequented the nieces of Advocate General Séguier and physician Louis-Guillaume Le Veillard, a close friend of Franklin.

=== The agronomist ===
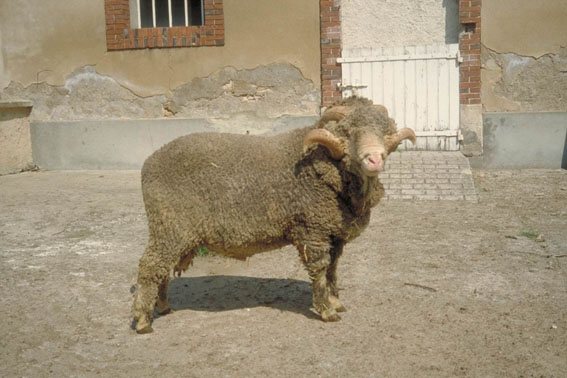
Jean Chanorier played a key role in the spread of the Rambouillet Merino in France

A major landowner and correspondent of Daubenton, Chanorier contributed to the improvement of sheep breeding in France by introducing the merino sheep in 1786. He was one of three owners of these Spanish-bred sheep, along with Louis Silvy at Champgueffier castle and the King at his Rambouillet sheepfold. It was from the latter that Chanorier, the first buyer of the sheepfold, procured his own animals. They themselves came from the herd purchased in Segovia (Spain) by the diplomat Jean-François de Bourgoing. Having purchased some twenty head in 1786, Chanorier, through carefully controlled breeding, increased the size of his flock to 300 head in 1793, then 350 in 1799, not counting the hundred or so lambs he sold each year. Chanorier attached great importance to the choice of females, contrary to the common practice of the time. By crossing local ewes, selected by him, with Spanish rams, he obtained a mixed variety, whose wool is indistinguishable from that of Spain. His flock was renowned among agronomists, who were interested in the possibilities of acclimatizing the Spanish Merino in France. Following in Perthuis' footsteps, Chanorier adopted a system of floor shepherding for his merinos, to collect the urine-impregnated manure, a fertilizer.

Chanorier's flock was considered of public importance, so much that in 1795, when he was forced to emigrate to Switzerland to escape the Terror, his sheep were protected by veterinarian François-Hilaire Gilbert, who had them transferred to the national sheepfold in Rambouillet, under the care of its director, Henri-Alexandre Tessier. The Committee of Public Safety decreed Chanorier's estate and flock of "rural establishment", preventing their sale after confiscation, and placed them under the control of the Agriculture and Arts Commission. Tessier, Gilbert and Huzard work together to ensure the proper preservation of the herd. When Chanorier returned from exile, he was surprised to find that his herd had grown and enriched during his absence. The support of the greatest names in veterinary medicine at the time is explained by the economic and scientific stakes involved in acclimatizing Merino sheep in France.

Chanorier's agronomic experimentation did not stop at breeding: he set up a hand-cranked watering system to irrigate the market garden crops; he had his estate fenced off to protect it from animal pests, notably the rabbits that abounded on the neighboring lands of the Count of Artois; he had mulberry trees planted to breed silkworms; he installed a Vaucanson weaving loom; and finally, in 1788, he had a school opened in the main street of the village.

At a time when the potato was still a novelty in France, Chanorier demonstrated through experimentation that it was possible to grow this tuber on arid, siliceous soils by postponing planting until spring. This method was later published in the Cours complet d’agriculture (Complete Course of Agriculture) by François Rozier and his followers. Finally, he perfected and developed a new variety of potato that would bear his name, the "chanorière".

=== The politician ===
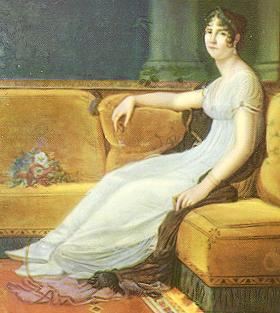
Joséphine de Beauharnais' friendship undoubtedly played an important role in Jean Chanorier's career

In 1788, Chanorier was one of twelve representatives of the Third estate at the provincial assembly of Saint-Germain, held at the home of the Count of Artois. Sitting in the tax office, he criticized the tax system, the taille and the industry tax, and supported the creation of a territorial tax. As a member of the assembly of the nobility of the Provost and Viscounty of Paris, he took part in the election of deputies to the Estates-General. During the Chatou riot of 11 May 1789, directed against his neighbor and friend Bertin, he acted as mediator between the villagers and the former Controller General of Finances. Chanorier was finally elected, by 51 votes out of 52 cast, as the first mayor of the commune of Croissy, from 22 January 1790 to 14 November 1790. He was then elected commissaire de l'Assemblée primaire de la première section du canton extra-muros de Saint-Germain-en-Laye.

Mayor of Croissy, it was he who paid for the creation of the National Guard and made his pastures available for the celebration of the Mass for the Federation on 14 July 1790, during which he renewed his oath of allegiance. On 20 November 1789, he made a patriotic donation of 9000 pounds. However, on 14 November 1790, he resigned as mayor, officially because he was preparing to spend the winter in Paris. On 17 August 1792, at the request of the district, the city sealed and confiscated the gunpowder in his château while he was away. This measure applied to all wealthy Parisians with homes in the village, although the new mayor protested Chanorier's patriotism. He is suspected of having emigrated to Koblenz to join his sovereign, the Prince of Condé. On his return, Chanorier took the oath of equality and liberty, reaffirmed his attachment to the Revolution, approved the confiscations, and donated his silverware to the Paris mint as proof of his good faith.

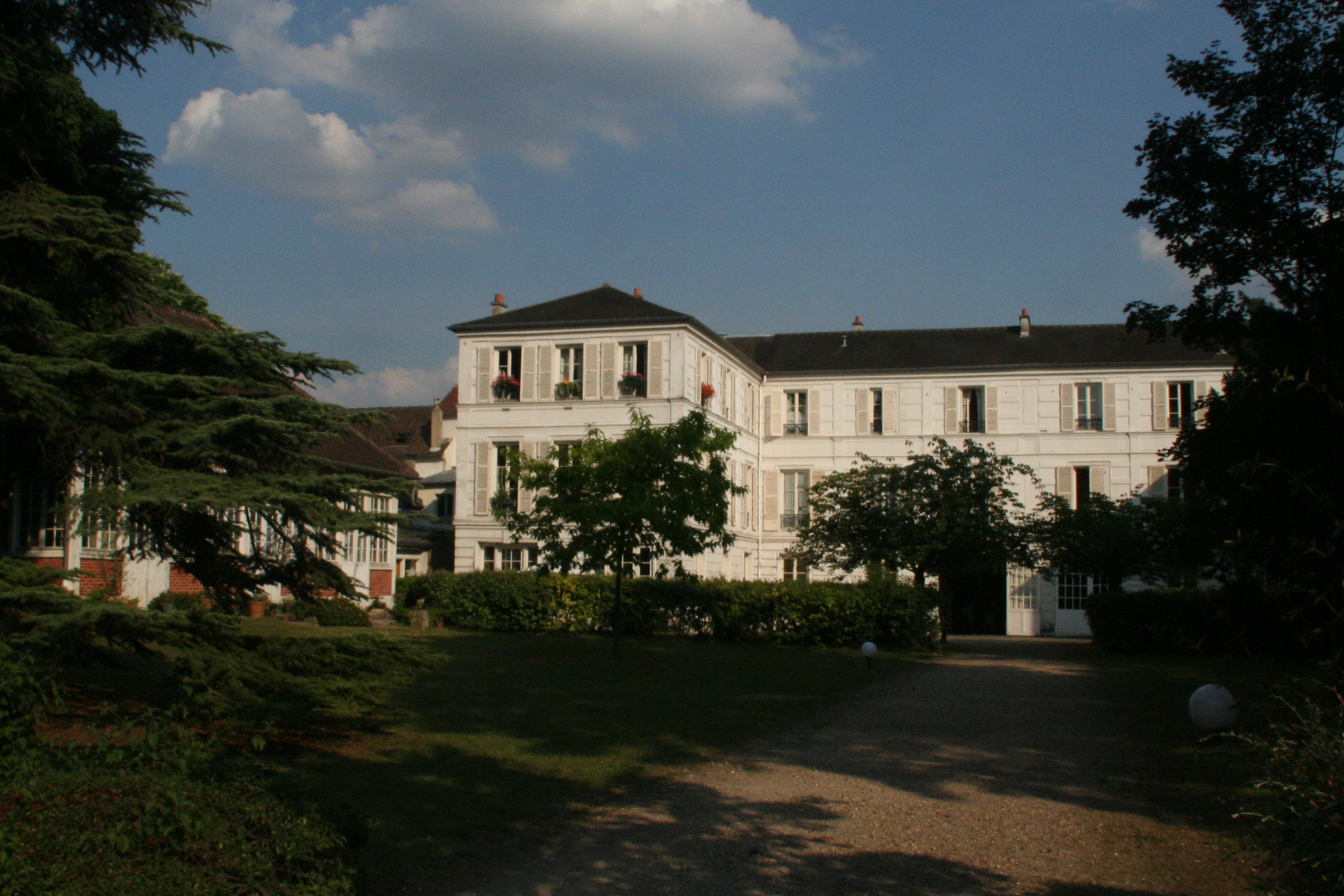
The garden facade of the "Maison-Joséphine" in Croissy, where Joséphine de Beauharnais lived from 1793

When Joséphine de Beauharnais moved to Croissy in 1793, she apprenticed her ten-year-old daughter Hortense to Julie Blezeau, a seamstress at the Château de Chanorier. The château became a meeting place for aristocrats who had fled Paris, such as Madame Campan, one of Marie-Antoinette's ladies-in-waiting, the refractory priest Mayneaud de Pancemont, and Jean-Charles Gravier, baron de Vergennes, son of the former minister, and above all his wife, the comtesse de Rémusat, who lived there for several months. Girondin Pierre-François Réal was also a regular at Chanorier castle. The ties forged at Croissy between Chanorier and his friends, and the future Empress Josephine, would later favor their careers under the Empire.

During his trial before the Revolutionary court, Parisian notary François Brichard mentioned Chanorier's name, as he had given him information on a client's solvency. The Committee of Public Safety indicted Chanorier, but the agent sent to his Parisian home – then located on rue des Fossés-Montmartre (now rue Feydeau) – could not find him at home. Chanorier was forced to flee Paris and spend some time in Switzerland, returning only after Thermidor.

The commune, then the district, confirmed that he was a patriot. The département, considering that he had emigrated to a friendly country, authorized his return, after consulting the agriculture and arts commission. The school he had created in Croissy having been put up for sale as national property, he bought it back and donated it to the commune. On 1 August 1797 (Thermidor 19, V), he was appointed property tax assessor for the commune of Croissy, and on 26 November (Frimaire 6), a member of the department's equity commission, from which he was immediately disbarred as an ex-noble.

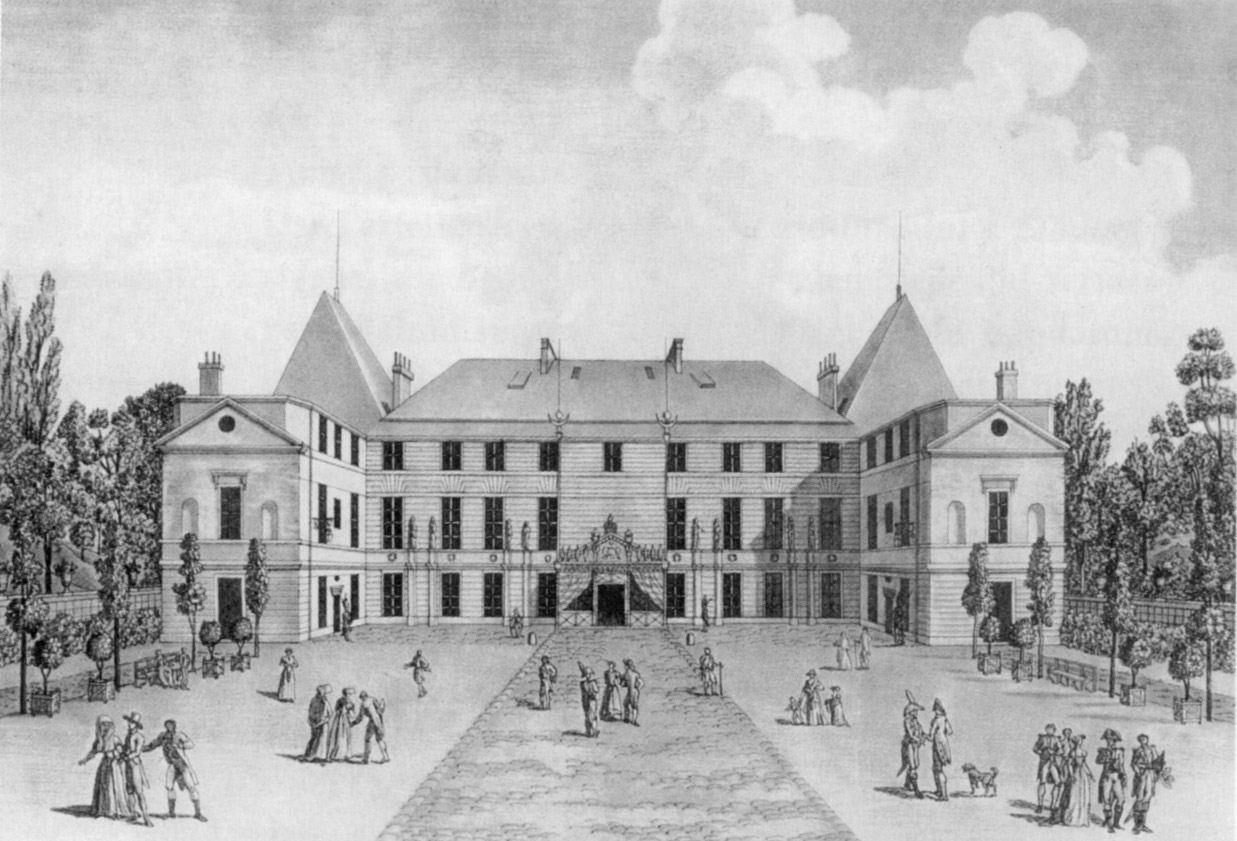
Joséphine de Beauharnais sought Jean Chanorier's advice to buy her Malmaison estate

The future Empress Joséphine de Beauharnais called on him to appraise the Malmaison estate and negotiate its purchase for her. Always passionate about livestock issues, he suggested increasing the estate's income by increasing the flock from 150 to 300 sheep. Joséphine was likely to follow this advice, as she asked him to hand over her master shepherd.

Thanks to this friendship, under the Consulate, he was appointed one of the three directors of the Caisse d'Amortissement, along with Mollien, Napoleon's future finance minister, and Jean-Baptiste Decrétot, by a decree dated Frimaire 8, An VIII (29 November 1799). He was favored by the First Consul, Napoléon Bonaparte, who had married his friend Joséphine de Beauharnais. His agronomic career continued in parallel, as he was president of the Société libre d'agriculture de Seine-et-Oise from 4 January to 23 July 1799.

On Germinal 27, Year vii, he was elected deputy to the Conseil des Cinq-Cents (Council of Five Hundred) by the assembly of electors of Seine-et-Oise, by 181 votes out of 355 cast, without his nobility being held against him. His legislative activity seems to have been limited. Then, by decree of the First Consul dated 1 Prairial, Year vii, he was appointed member of the General Council of Seine-et-Oise, where he dealt with land issues.

=== Member of the Institut ===
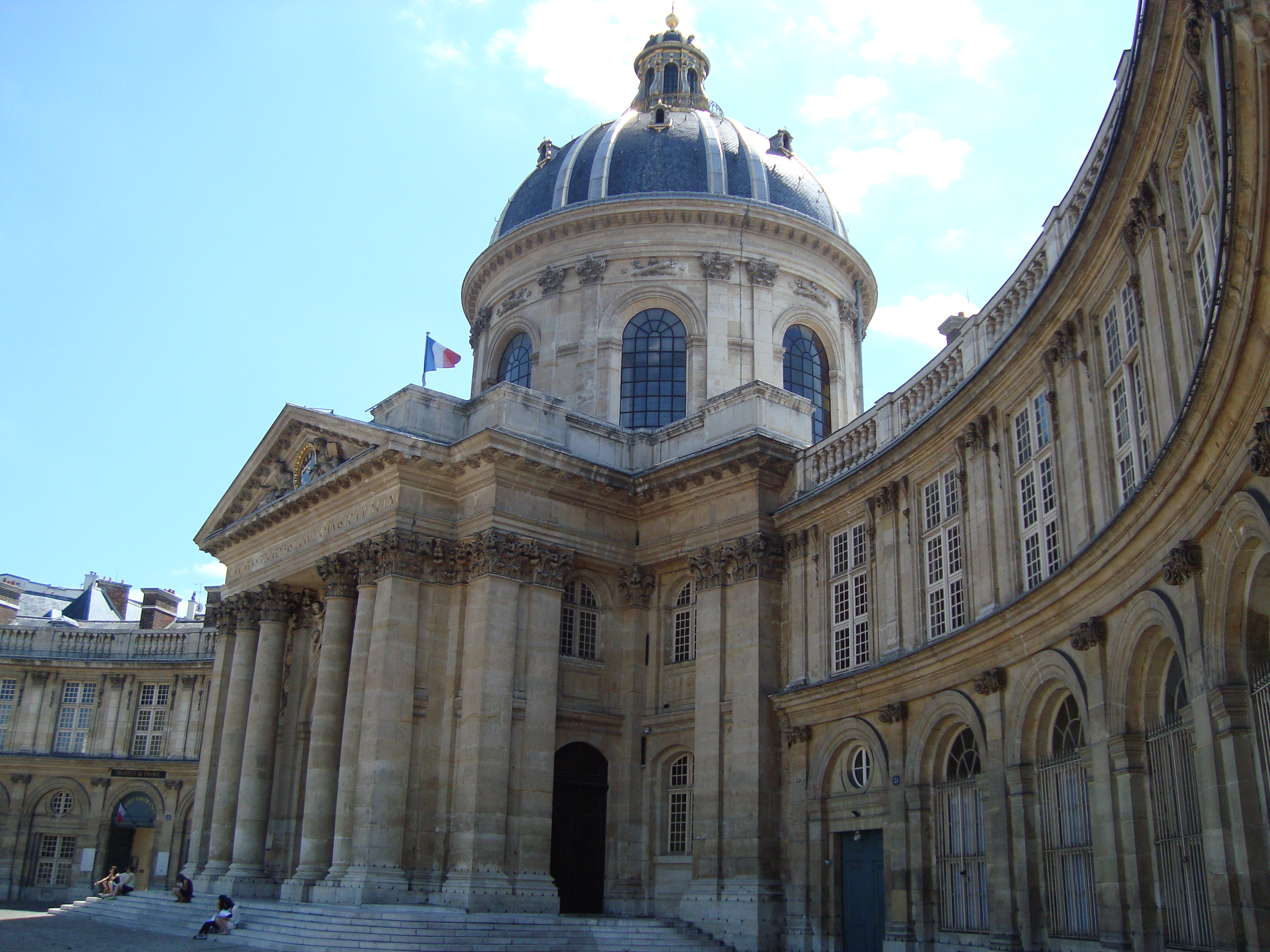
Chanorier was an associate member of the Institut de France, where he gave just one speech

On 25 September 1797 Chanorier was elected a non-resident associate member of the Institut de France for the Class of Sciences (section of Rural Economy and Veterinary Art), then in 1803, a corresponding member. He took part in the life of the Institute, but did not write: his agronomic work and speeches were the subject of reports written by prestigious scientists. A practitioner rather than a theorist of agronomy, Chanorier probably owed his appointment to the Institut more to Joséphine's protection than to his scientific reputation.

On 26 Floréal Year vii he read a dissertation on sheets woven from wool from his farm, which was printed. In it, he demonstrated that it was possible to dye Spanish sheep's wool, contrary to popular belief. Chanorier experimented with the help of Leroy and Rouy from the Sedan factory. On his instructions, opticians Zougan and Richer designed a micrometer for analyzing the fibers of his wools, which he compared with Spanish samples brought back to him by merchant Delon. The aim was to check whether the wool from sheep raised in France met Daubenton's criteria for fineness and quality, i.e. wool whose fibers had a diameter of less than 1/60th of a millimeter, thus demonstrating that these animals did not degenerate, despite the different soil and climate from Spain. The stakes are both theoretical and economic. Daubenton, Fourcroy and Desmarets reported glowingly on Chanorier's breeding results, and asked for his short memoir to be published. On 15 Messidor Year viii, he should have read another text, had the session not been adjourned by the president due to Sébastien Mercier's mediocre performance.

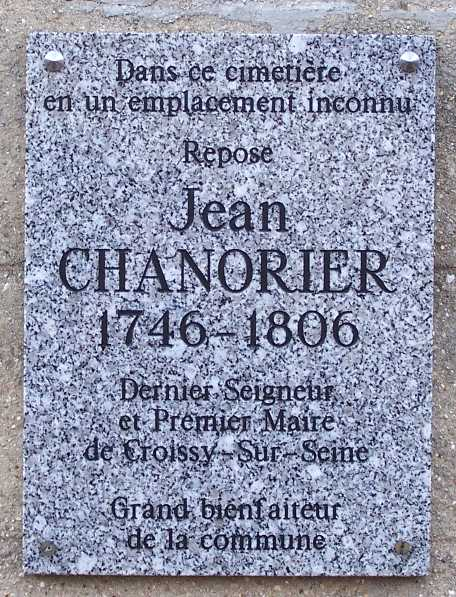
Commemorative plaque in Croissy-sur-Seine cemetery

Although he hardly ever wrote, Chanorier's practical skills were nonetheless called upon by his colleagues at the Institut. He was a member of the commission headed by Huzard, which included Parmentier, Cuvier, Hallé and Tessier, charged with examining sheep suffering from "tournis". Because of his links with his former colleague Mollien, now Minister of Finance, he was asked to solve the problem posed by the collection sent by Chevalier Blanks being held in customs at Calais. Concerned with the spread of Merino sheep, he provided training for breeders, offering buyers of his flock's products two decades' worth of boarding for their shepherds.

=== The end of his life ===
From Year IX (1800–1801) Chanorier gave up all political functions, due to his declining health. Suffering from paralysis and impaired mental faculties, he was placed under judicial interdict on 24 Floréal Year X. In a will dated 9 Frimaire, Year ix, he created an annuity of 300 francs to provide food for poor elderly people in the commune of Croissy-sur-Seine. This annuity was validated by imperial decree on 6 June 1807.

The castle he owned in Croissy became a cultural center, and a school was named after him.

== Publications ==
- Daubenton, Fourcroy, Desmarets, Troupeaux de bêtes à laine de pure race d’Espagne du C. Chanorier, membre associé de l’Institut, à Croissy-sur-Seine, près Chatou, département de Seine-et-Oise, Vve Huzard, Paris, year VII, 8 p.
- " Mémoire sur un drap bleu teint en laine et fabriqué avec les toisons du troupeau de race pure d’Espagne établi à Croissy-sur-Seine, département de Seine-et-Oise ", in 1786, by citizen Chanorier, in Mémoires de l'Institut national des sciences et arts... Sciences mathematics and physiques, year VII [1798–1799] (t. 2), p. 484-88.

== See also ==
- Croissy-sur-Seine
- Merino
- Joséphine de Beauharnais

== Bibliography ==
- Bonnet, Charles. "Chanorier, dernier seigneur de Croissy, la Fédération, l'émigration et Brumaire". Croissy Saint-Léonard, un village sous l'ancien régime (D'après les pièces authentiques). Centenaire de 1789 (in French). Croissy Saint-Léonard: Doizelet.
- Bonnet, Charles. Le Village de Croissy sous l'Ancien Régime et pendant la Révolution (in French). Angers.
- Prevost, M. (1959). "Chanorier, Jean". Dictionnaire de biographie française (in French).
- Robert Adolphe; Cougny, Gaston. "Jean Chanorier". Dictionnaire des parlementaires français.
