= St. Andrew's Church, Bayonne =

Church in Pyrénées-Atlantiques, France

St. Andrew's Church, Byonne French: église Saint-André de Bayonne Basque: San Andres eliza / Done Ander eliza (Baiona)
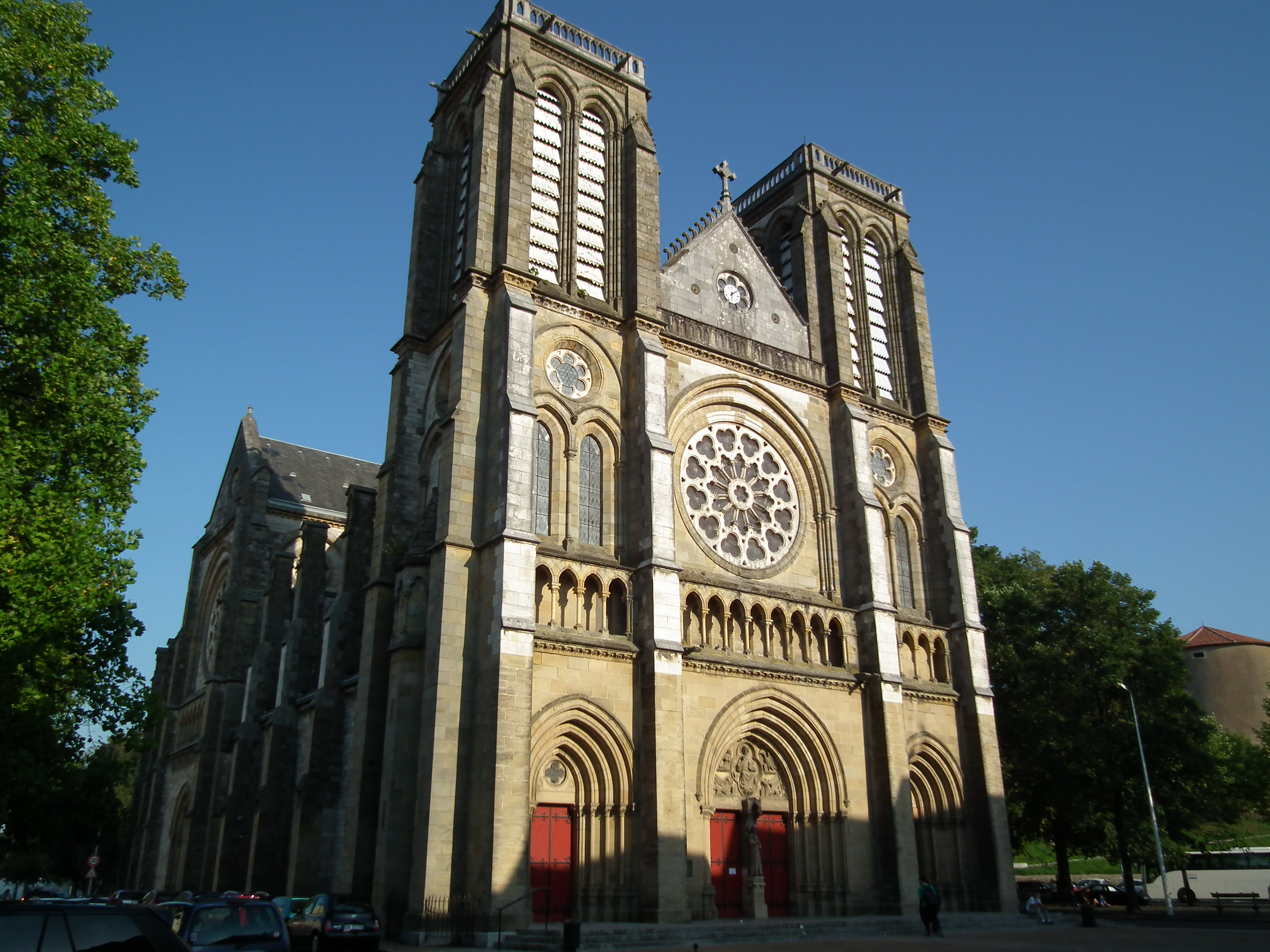

Religion
- Affiliation: Roman Catholic Church
- Province: Diocese of Bayonne, Lescar and Oloron
- Rite: Roman
- Ecclesiastical or organisational status: Parish church
- Status: Active

Location
- Location: Bayonne, Pyrénées-Atlantiques, France
- Interactive map of St. Andrew's Church, Byonne; French: église Saint-André de Bayonne; Basque: San Andres eliza / Done Ander eliza (Baiona)
- Coordinates: 43°29′26″N 1°28′15″W

Architecture
- Type: church
- Style: Neo-Gothic
- Groundbreaking: 1856
- Completed: 1869

Specifications
- Spire: 0 (formerly 2)
- Spire height: 74 meters (formerly)

St. Andrew's Church is a neo-Gothic Roman Catholic parish church in central Bayonne, Pyrénées-Atlantiques, France. It is dedicated to saint Andrew the Apostle.

== History ==
The church was designed by architects Hippolyte Durand and Hippolyte Guichenné and built in the neo-Gothic style in the Petit Bayonne neighborhood between 1856 and 1869, under Napoléon III's reign. It was built on the site of a former Jansenist high school. Its construction was mainly funded by a bequest (several donations totalling more than 5 million Francs) from banker Jacques Taurin de Lormand, who died in 1847. The town council allocated additional money for ending the works and purchasing furniture. The church was consecrated on March 7, 1862. The Capuchins' Church neighboring St Andrew's was demolished.

On December 13, 1895, the vault partly collapsed on the organ lofts because the ground was swampy. The 74-meter-high spires, which were too heavy, were demolished in 1901 and replaced by the two current belfry towers in 1903.

== Architecture ==
In the shape of a Latin cross, the church's design was inspired from the 13th-century Gothic churches with two front towers and an imposing rosette over the doors. It has three ribbed naves.

The inside of the church features a painting by Léon Bonnat (1833-1922) of Bayonne, which represents the Assumption of Mary. Another painting by Joseph Pascau (1875-1944) of Bayonne shows the Holy Family. The pipe organ was donated by Napoléon III in 1862 and inaugurated on April 9, 1836. It was made by Georges Wenner and Jean-Jacob Götty of Bordeaux, with 32 stops and 3 manuals. The organ was registered as an official Historical Monument object in 2002.

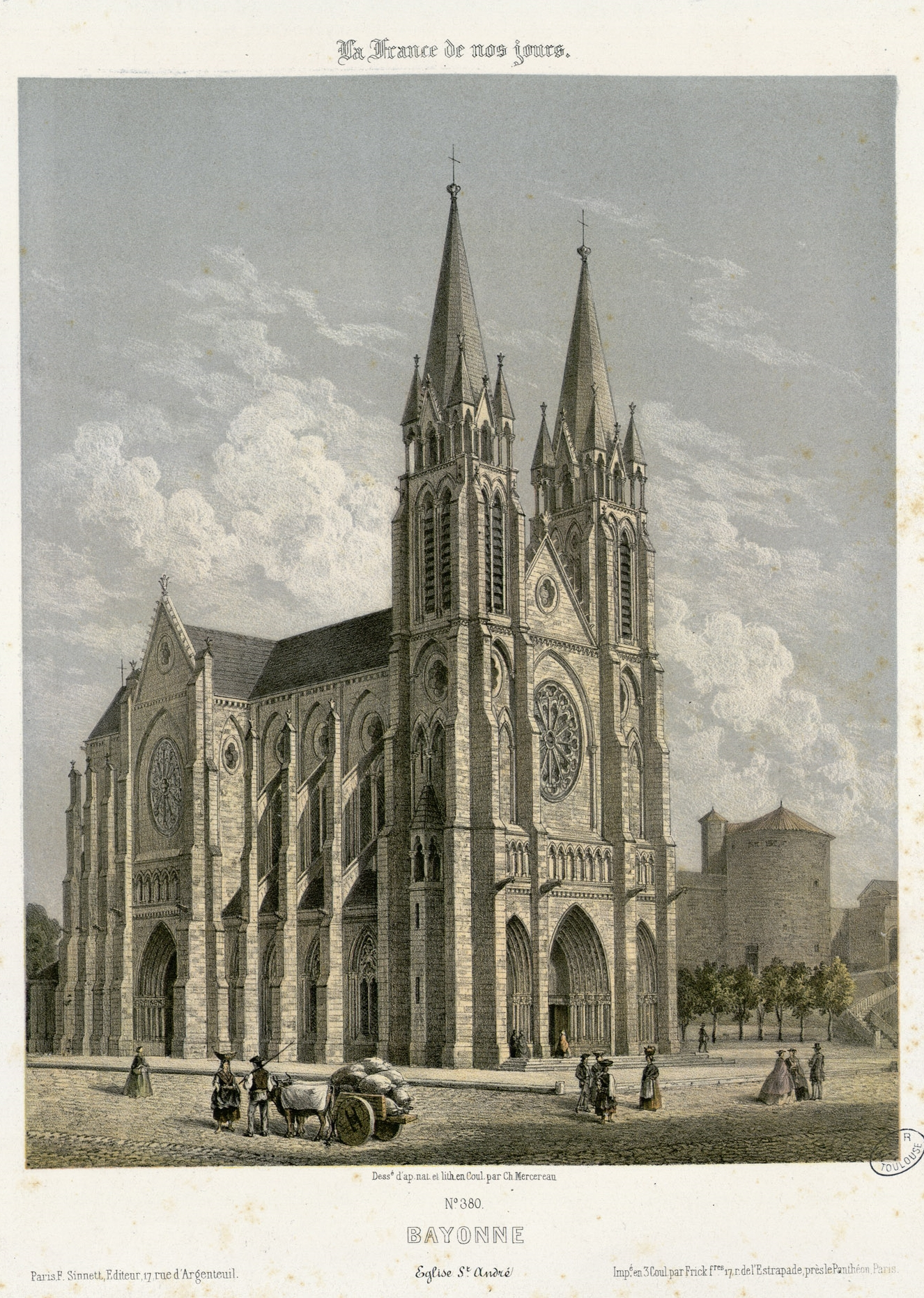
The former spires of the church

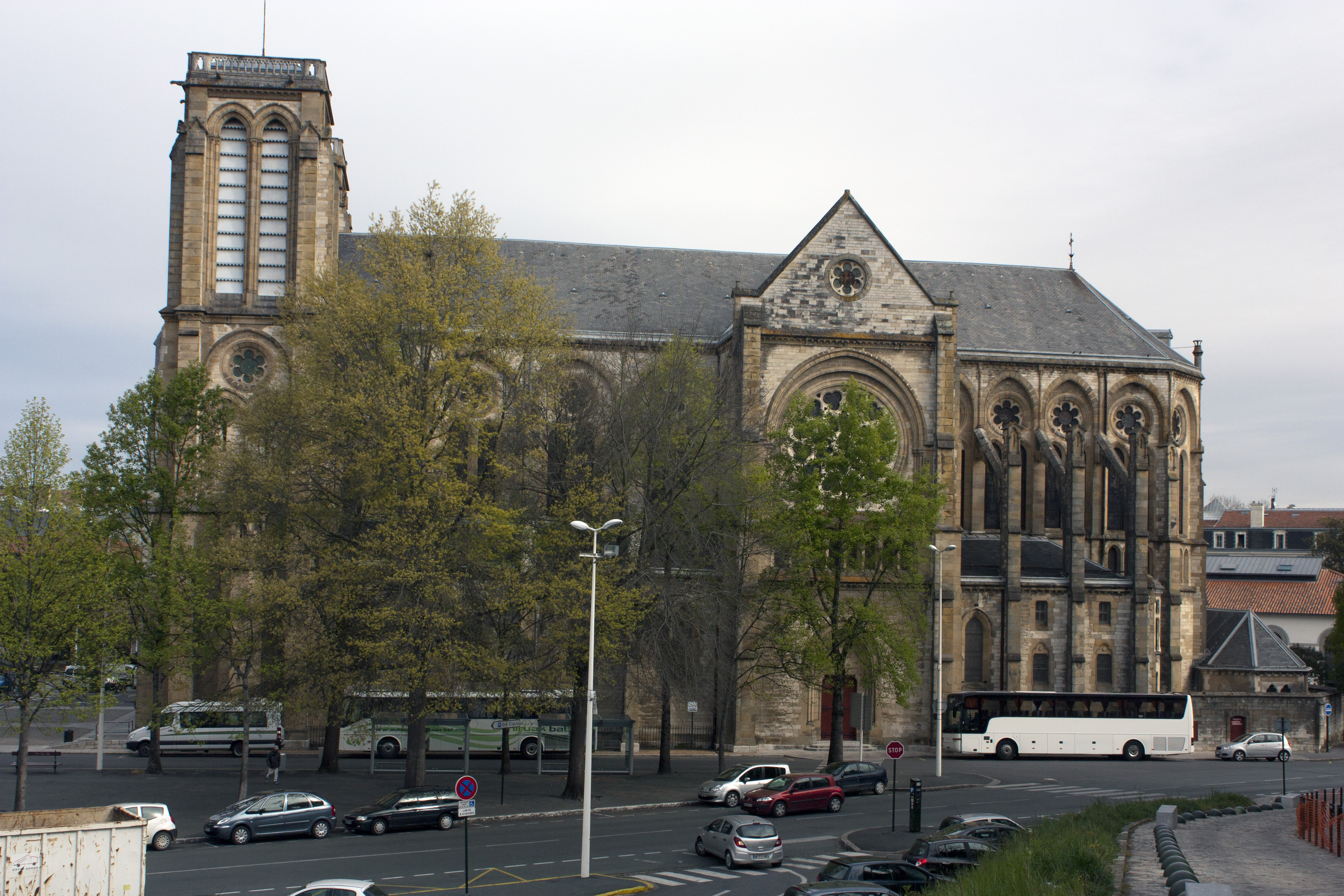
Southern side

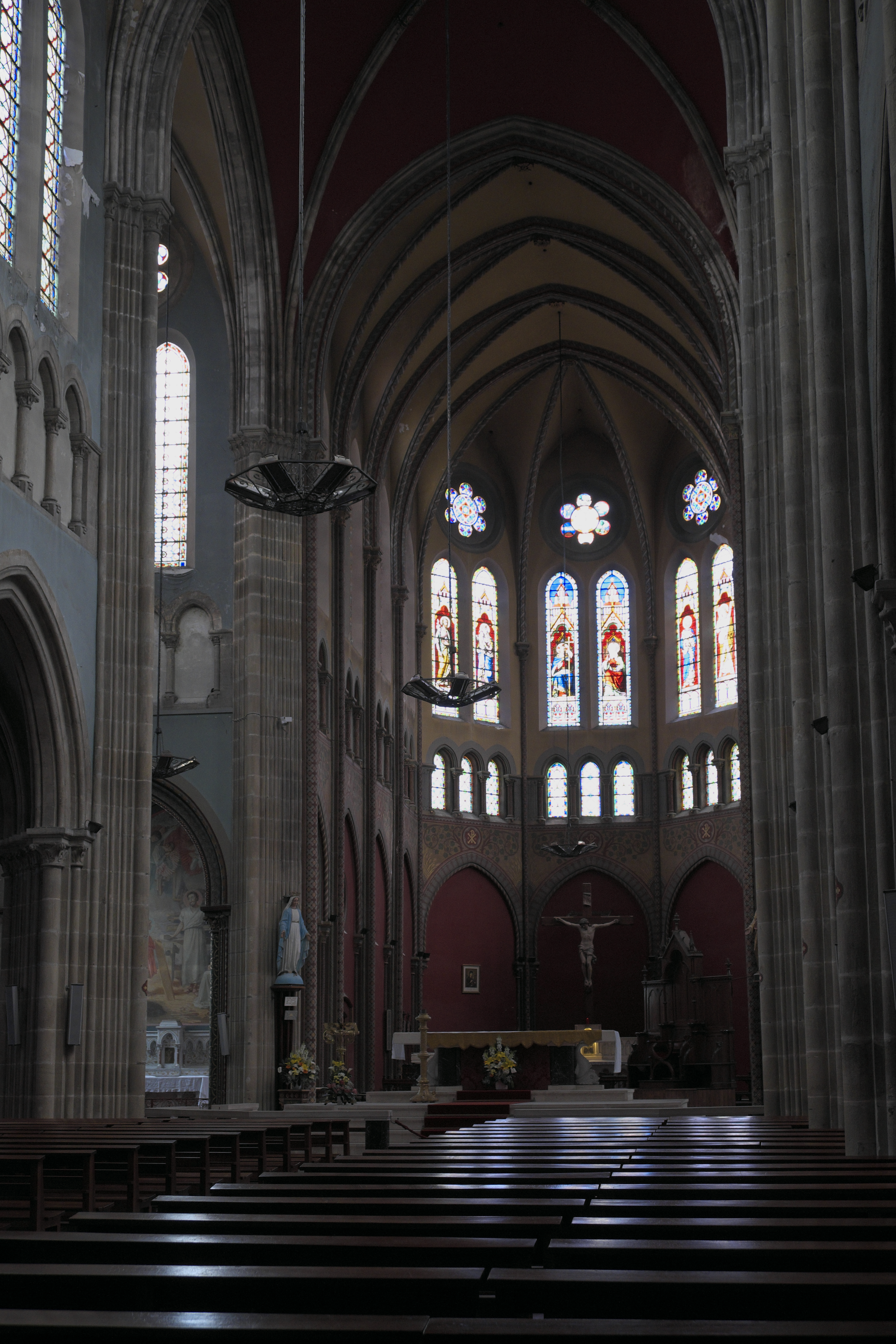
Inside the church

== Bibliography ==
- Édouard Ducéré (1976). Dictionnaire historique de Bayonne (in French). Vol. II. Bayonne: Laffitte.
