= Château de Monte-Cristo =

Writer's house museum in France

Coordinates: 48°53′8″N 2°6′12″E

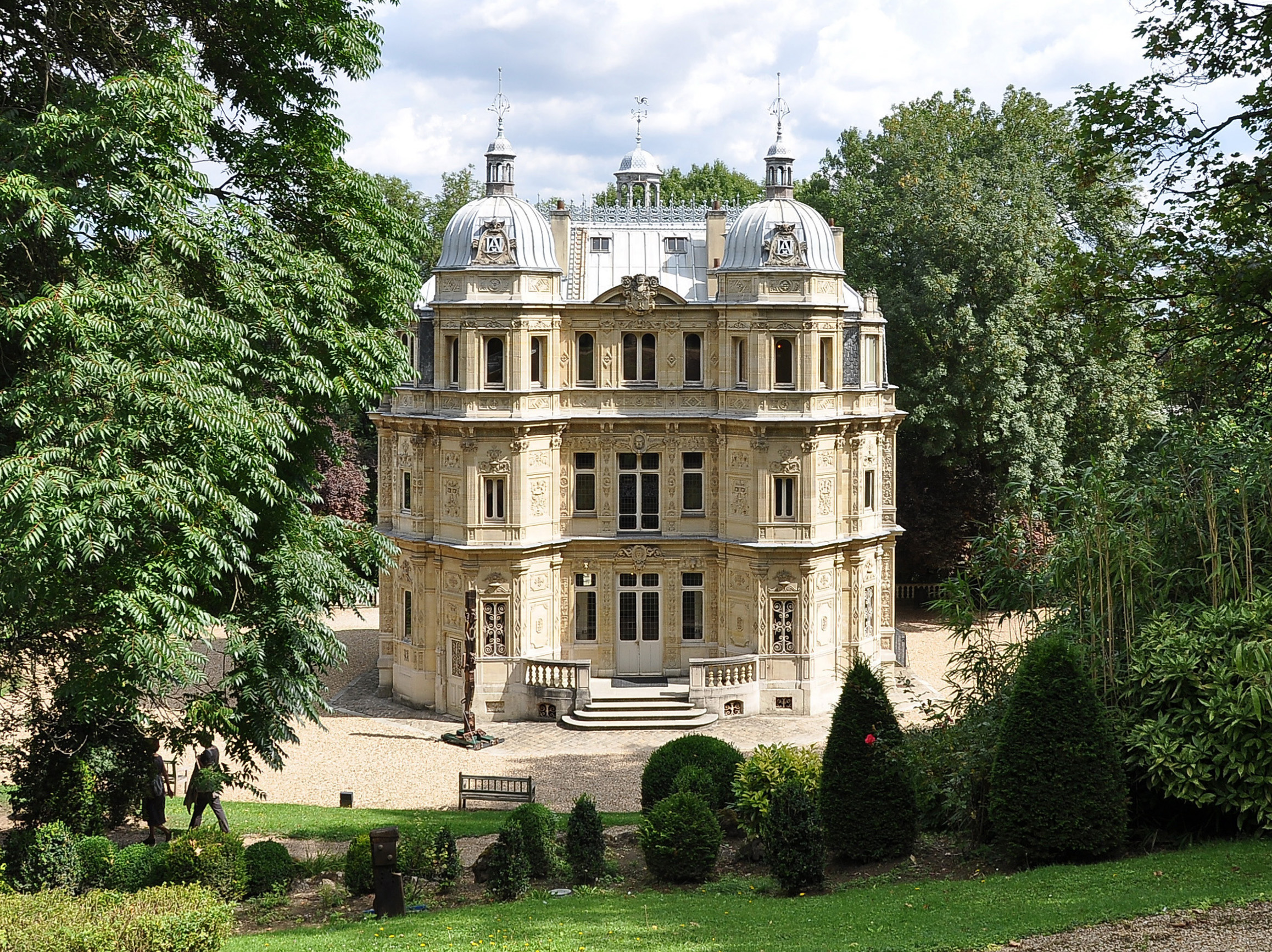
The Château de Monte-Cristo in 2010

The Château de Monte-Cristo (French pronunciation: [ʃato d(ə) mɔ̃tekʁisto]) is a writer's house museum in Le Port-Marly in the Yvelines department in Greater Paris, France. It was originally built as a residence for writer Alexandre Dumas (1802–1870).

== History ==
The château was designed by the architect Hippolyte Durand and built between 1844 and 1847 for writer Alexandre Dumas, at the cost of 500,000 francs. Dumas named it after his novel, The Count of Monte Cristo (1844). He called the château his personal "paradise on earth".

In 1848, short of money, Dumas sold the property for 31,000 francs.

Between 1954 and 1964, the château was the site of the British School of Paris. It fell into disrepair, and in 1969, its owners applied to replace the château with 400 flats. The local authority bought and renovated the property. Since 1994, the two châteaux and gardens have been restored. The entire property is operated as a public historic museum memorializing Dumas.

== Architecture ==
The château is Neo-Renaissance in style, with three storeys. Its façades are decorated with floral motifs, angels, and musical instruments, with a sculpture of a historical writer above each ground-floor window. Dumas' family shield appears above the main door.

Among its rooms is the Moors Salon, restored by Hassan II of Morocco. In the garden is a Neo-Gothic pavilion, which Dumas used as a writing office and named the Château d'If, after another setting from The Count of Monte Cristo.

== Gallery ==
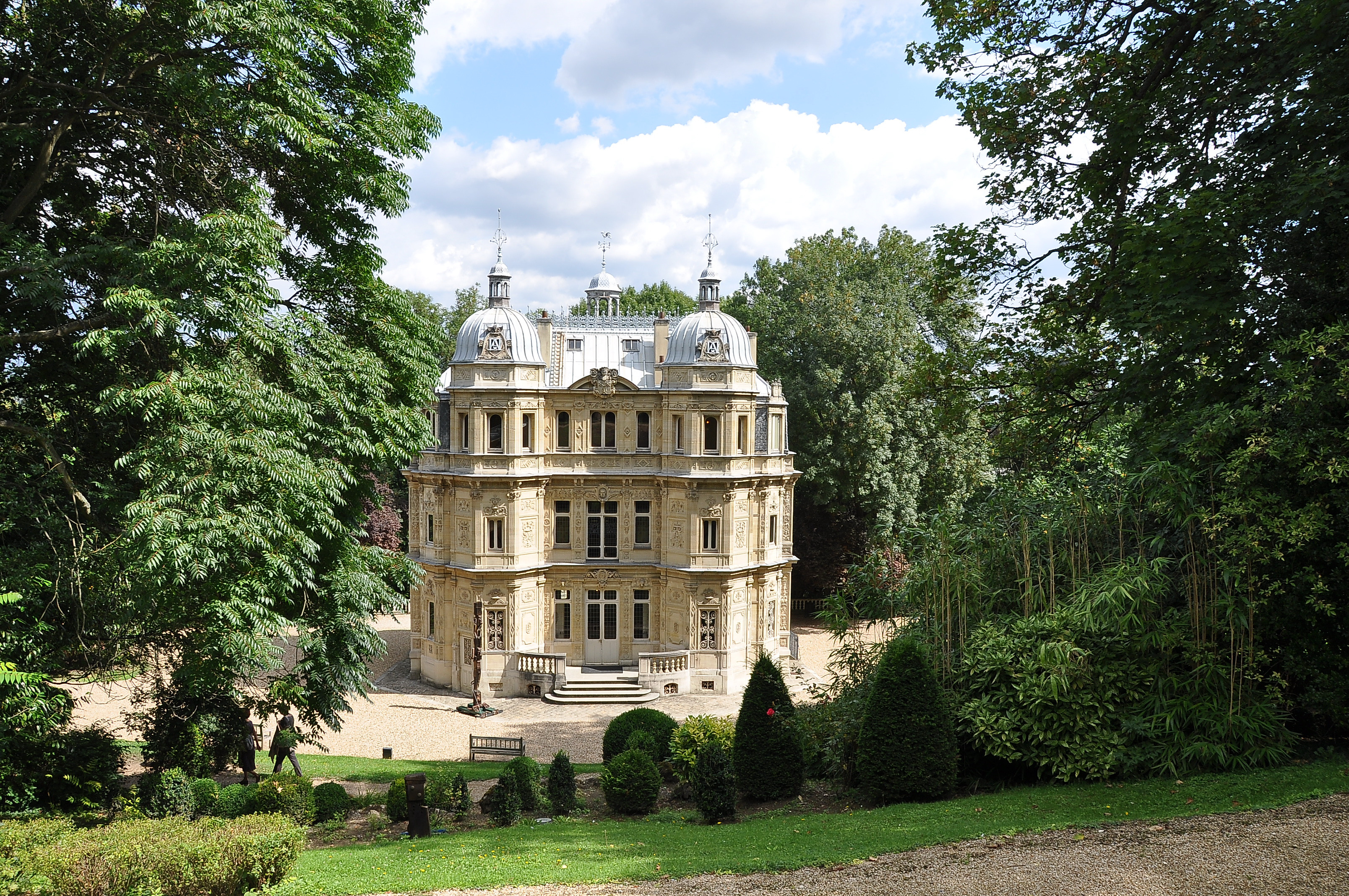
Château de Monte-Cristo, the main building

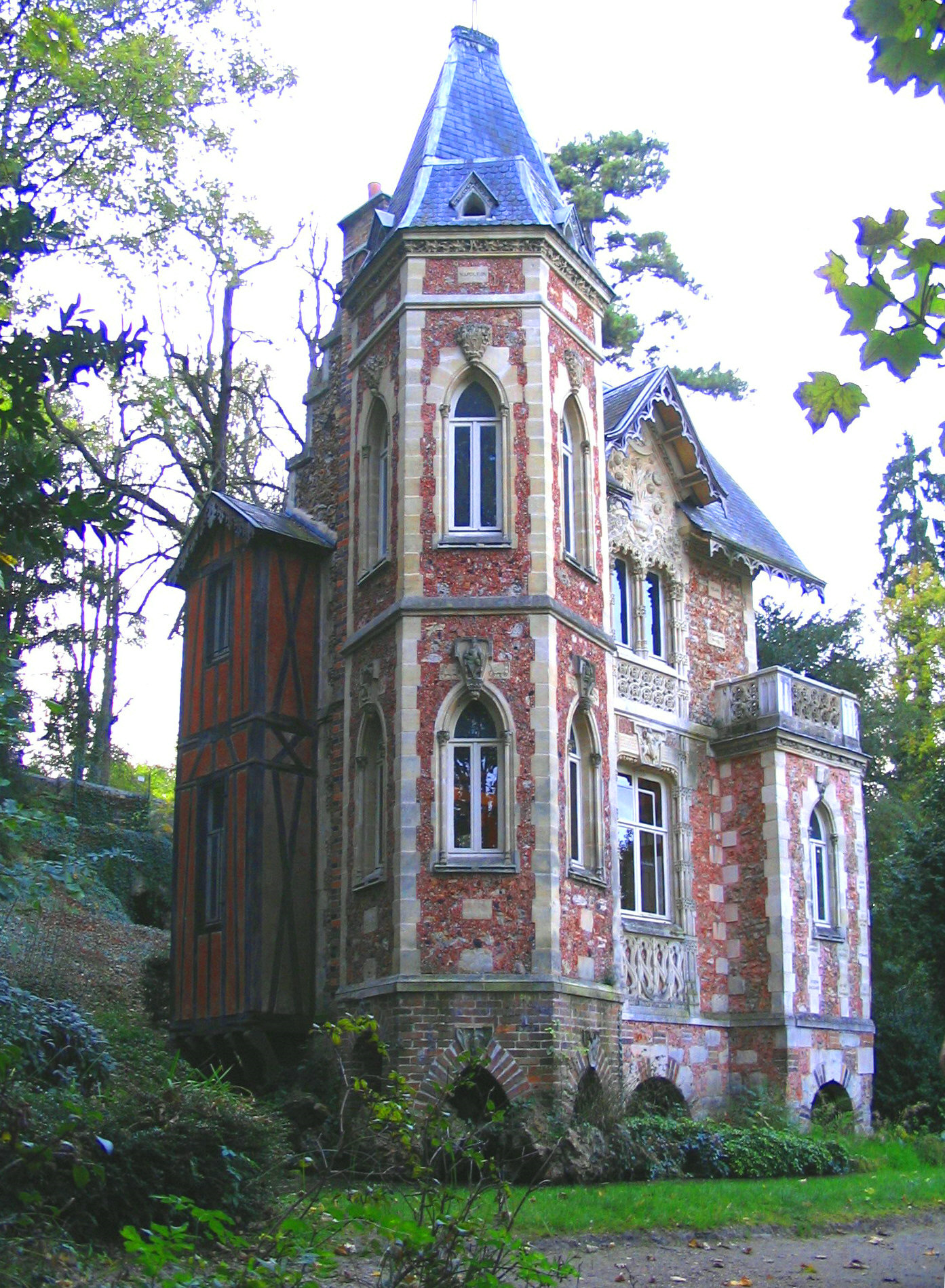
Separate building for writing studio, which Dumas named the Château d'If

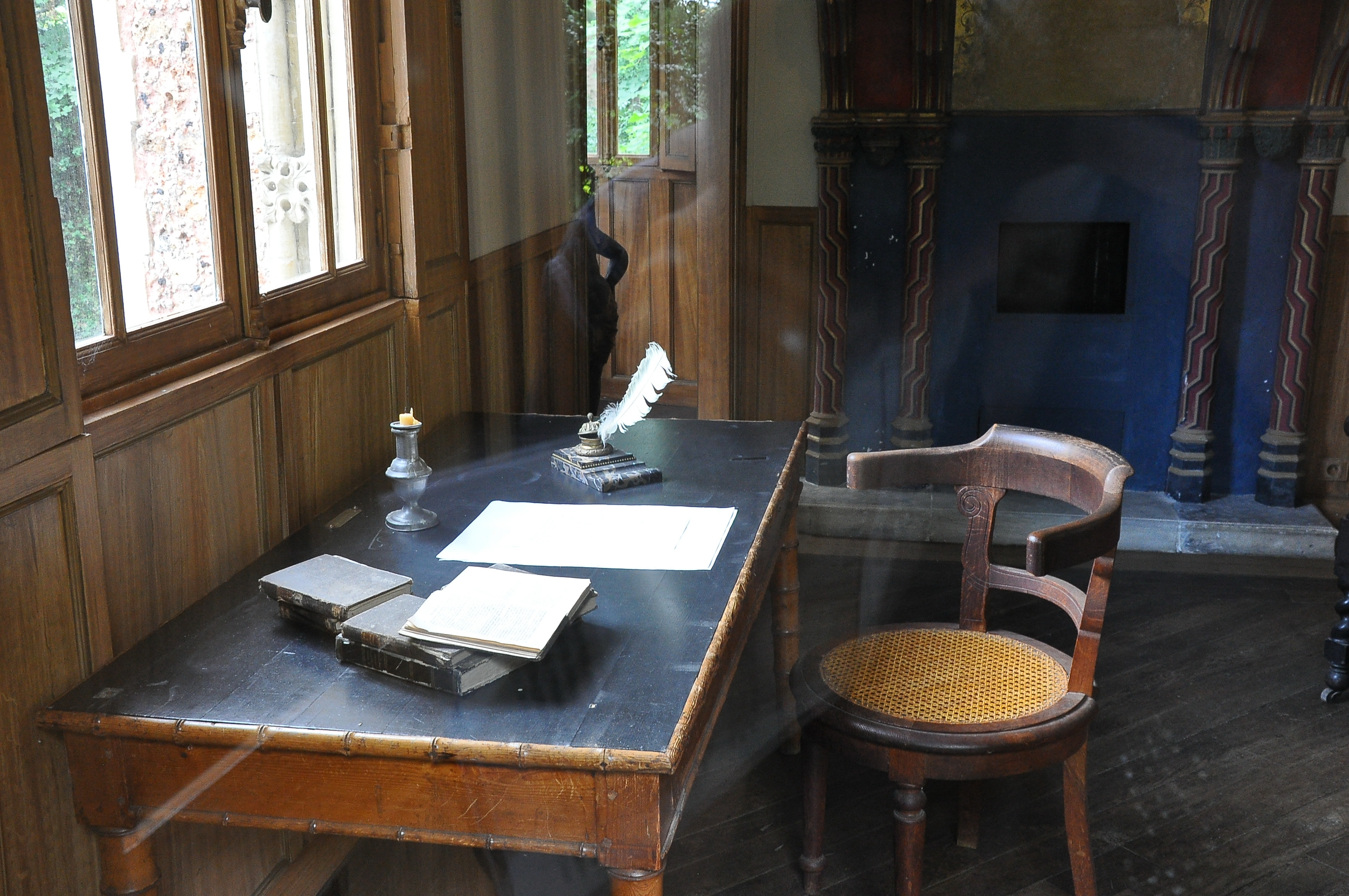
Work place of Alexandre Dumas in the Château d'If

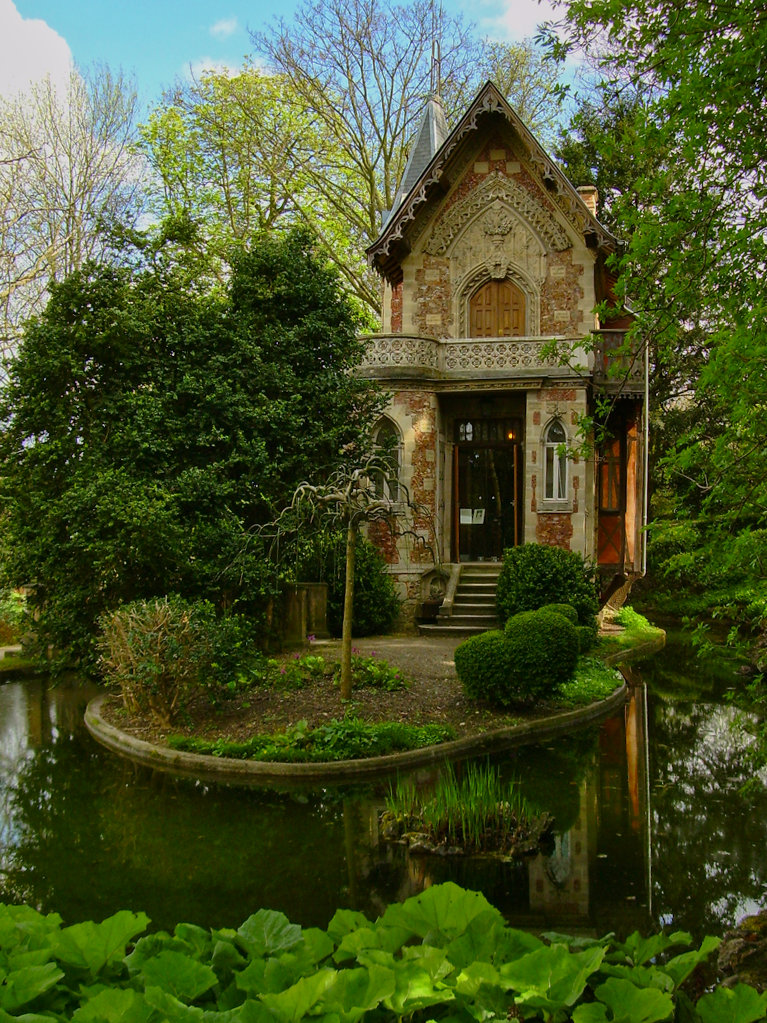
Château d'If

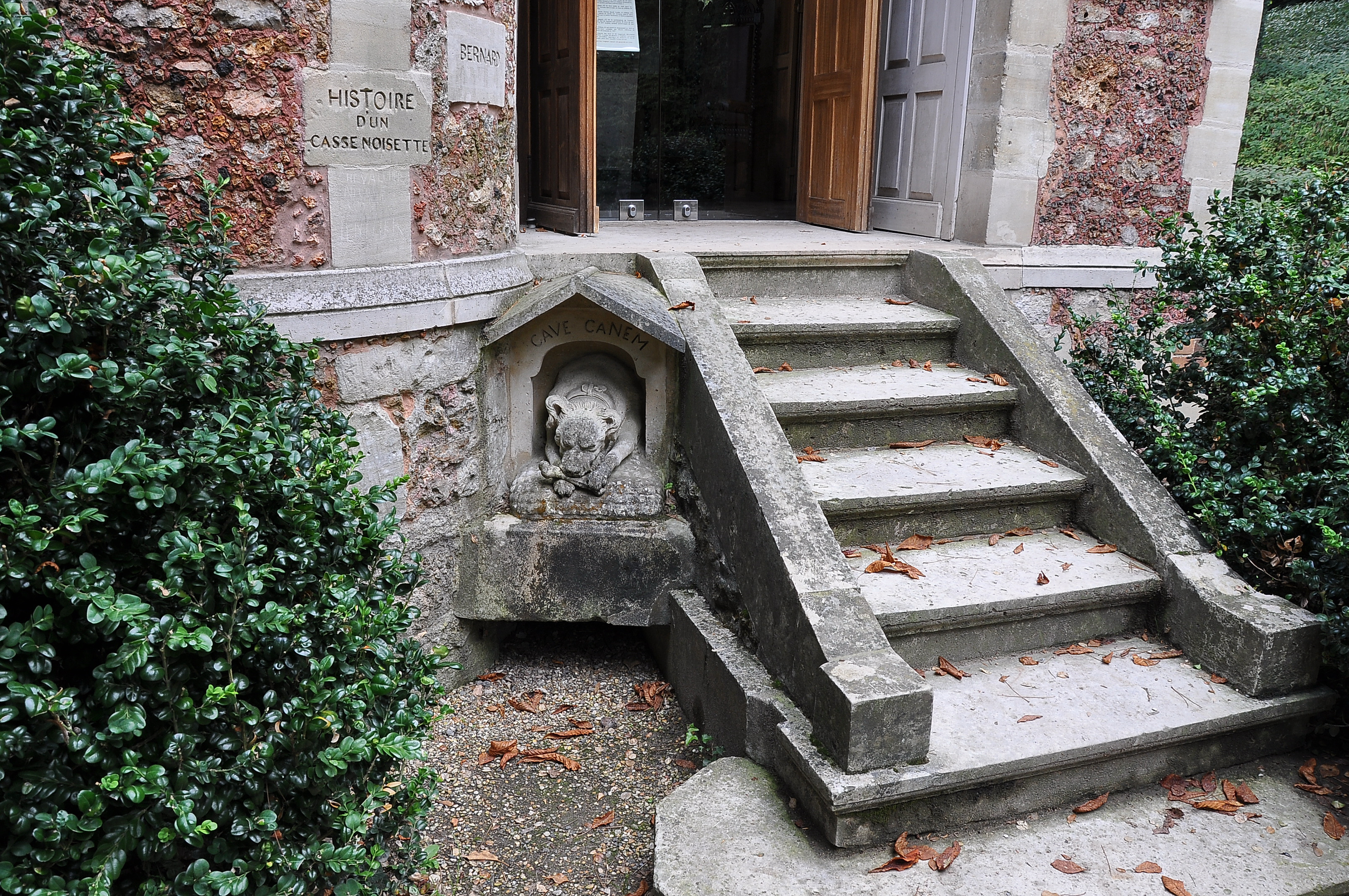
The decorated stairs of the Château d'If

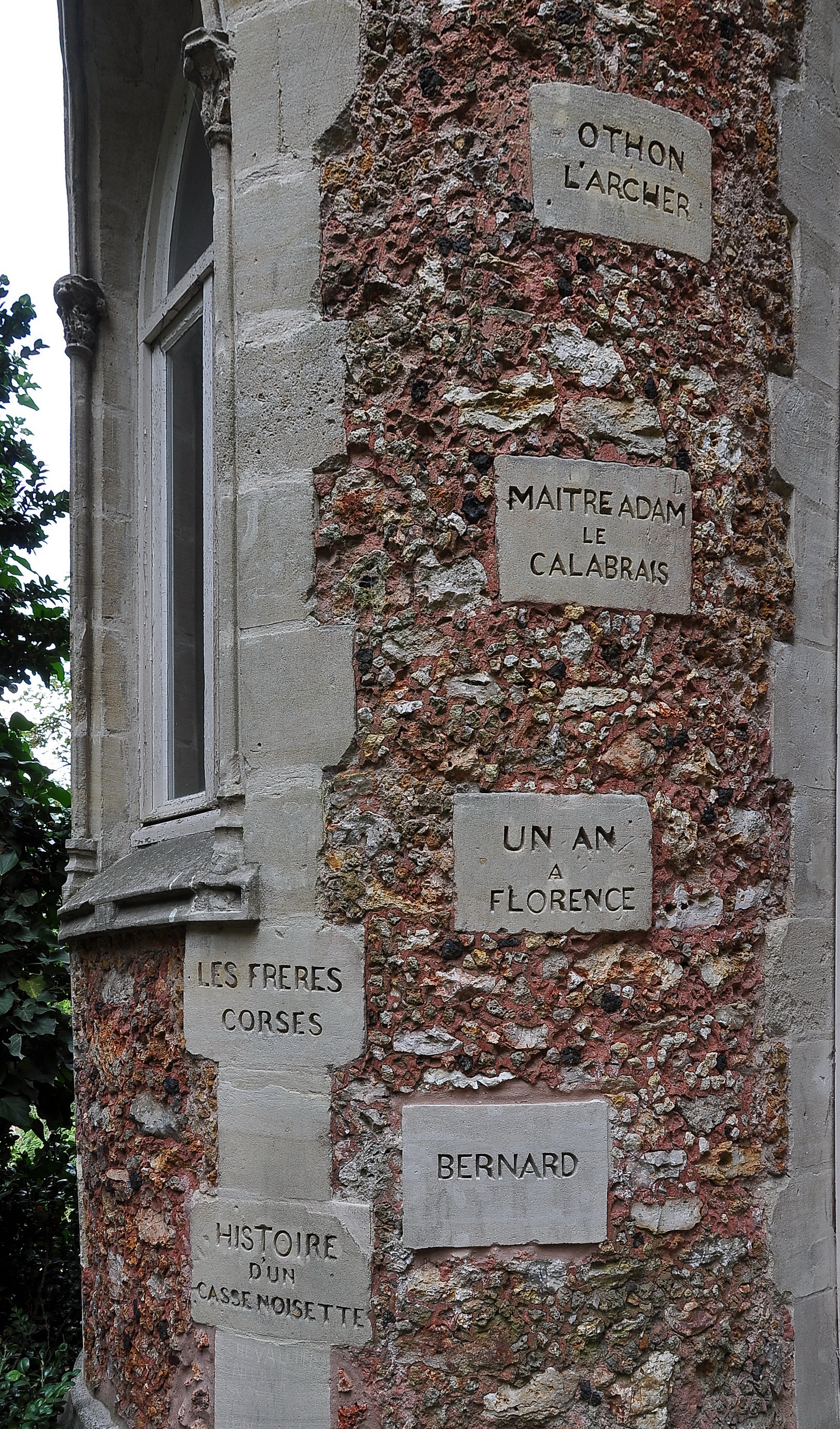
The titles of 88 works of the writer engraved on walls of Château d'If

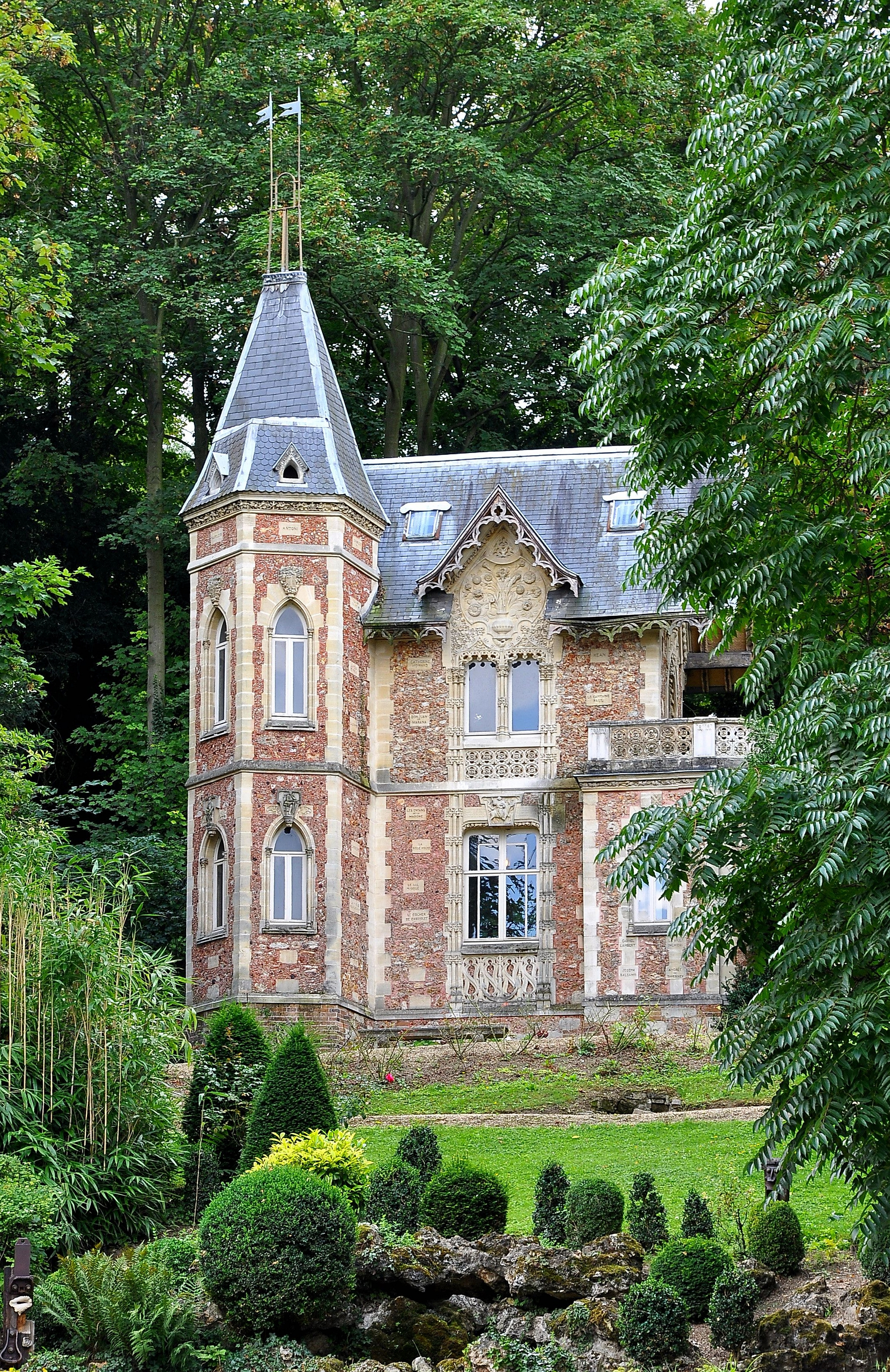
View of Chateau d'If from the Château de Monte-Cristo

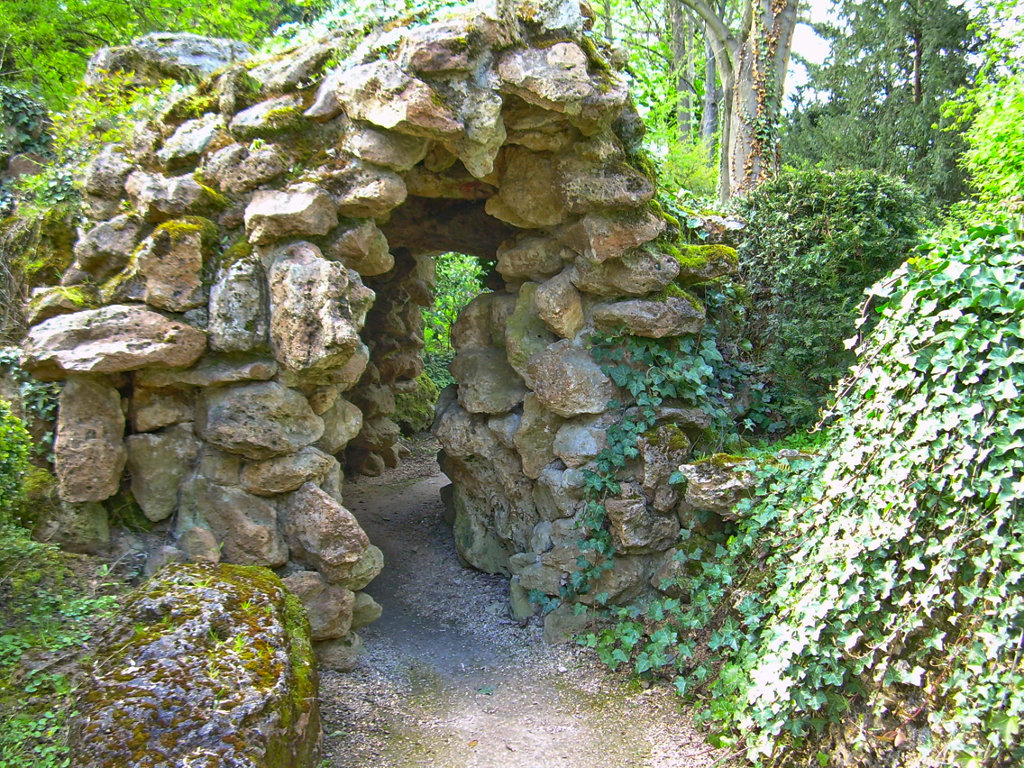
The grotto in the garden
