= Basilica of Our Lady of the Immaculate Conception =

Church in Lourdes, France

Basilica of Our Lady of the Immaculate Conception of Lourdes Notre-Dame de l'Immaculée-Conception de Lourdes (in French)
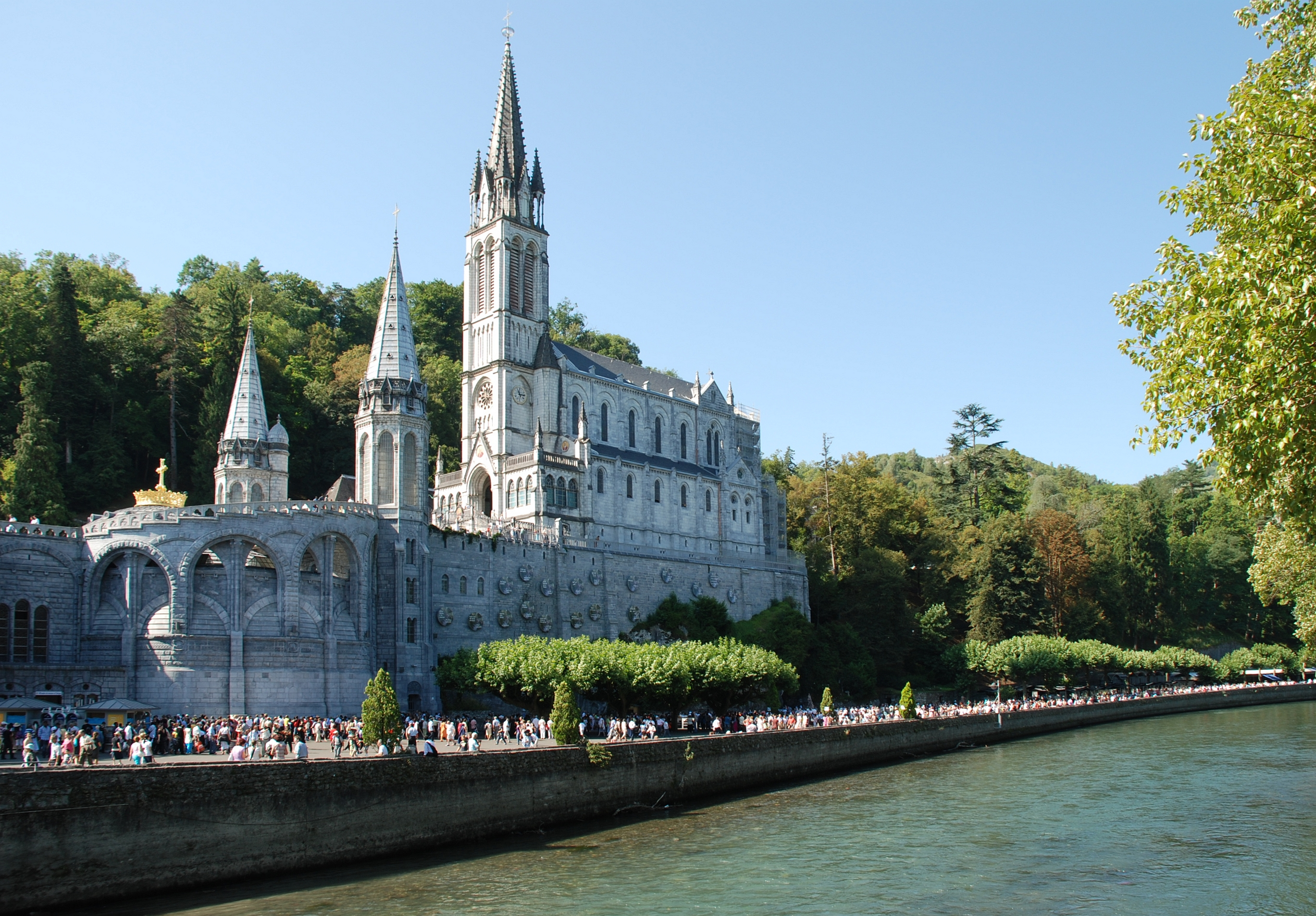

Religion
- Affiliation: Roman Catholic
- Ecclesiastical or organisational status: Minor basilica, National Shrine
- Year consecrated: 1876

Location
- Location: (France) Lourdes
- Interactive map of Basilica of Our Lady of the Immaculate Conception of Lourdes; Notre-Dame de l'Immaculée-Conception de Lourdes (in French)
- Coordinates: 43°5′50.5″N 0°3′30.1″W

Architecture
- Architect: Hippolyte Durand
- Type: Church
- Style: Neo-Gothic
- Groundbreaking: 1862
- Completed: 1871

Specifications
- Capacity: 550
- Length: 51 metres (167 ft)
- Width: 21 metres (69 ft)
- Height (max): 70 metres (230 ft)

Website
- Official website

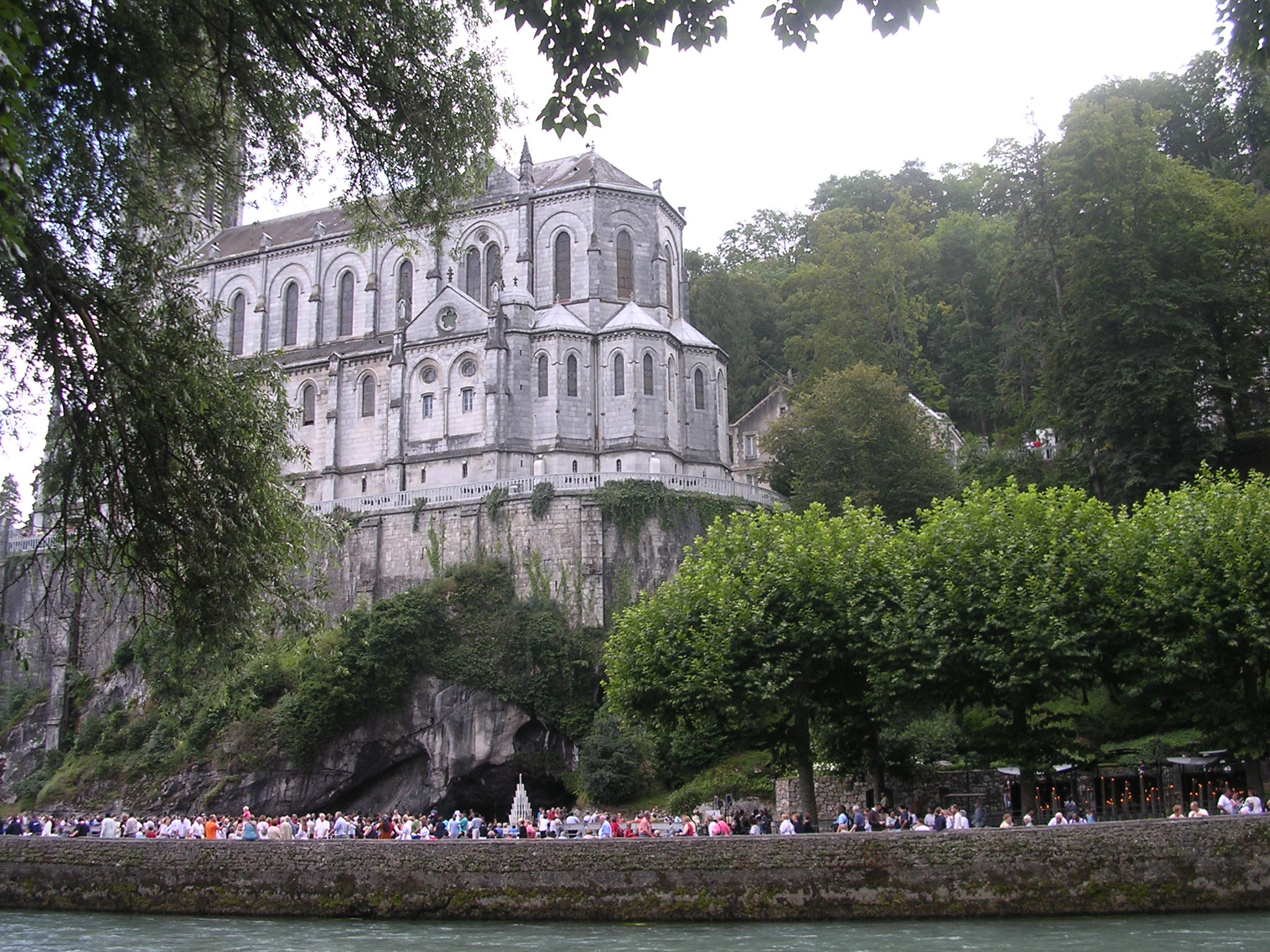
View of the Basilica constructed on top of the rock above the Grotto of Lourdes

The Basilica of Our Lady of the Immaculate Conception (French: Basilique de Notre-Dame de l'Immaculée-Conception de Lourdes), known widely as the "Upper Church", is a Catholic church and minor basilica within the Sanctuary of Our Lady of Lourdes in France.

== History ==
Constructed between 1862 and 1871 and consecrated in 1876, it was the second of the churches to be completed at the Sanctuary of Our Lady of Lourdes. The church was built on top of the rock above the Lourdes grotto and next to the Basilica of our Lady of the Rosary.

Designed by architect Hippolyte Durand, the Neo-Gothic church seems to emerge directly from the rock of Massabielle.

== Description ==
=== Exterior ===
The exterior is dominated by a 70 metres (230 ft) spire, and two lesser spires (not completed until 1908). Above the entrance is a mosaic depicting Pope Pius IX, who defined the dogma of the Immaculate Conception in 1854.

The clock plays the Ave Maria hourly, and chimes the hours with a 2-tonne bell called Jeanne-Alphonsine. The other bells in the tower are named Geneviève-Félicie (weighing 1800 kg), Hermine-Benoîte (1100 kg), and Cécile-Gastine (800 kg).

=== Interior ===
The walls are lined with ex voto plaques, and banners from official National Pilgrimages of the past. It has a series of stained glass windows depicting various events in the story of Lourdes, and the clerestory windows depict Mary as the Second Eve.
