= Croissy-sur-Seine =

- Commune
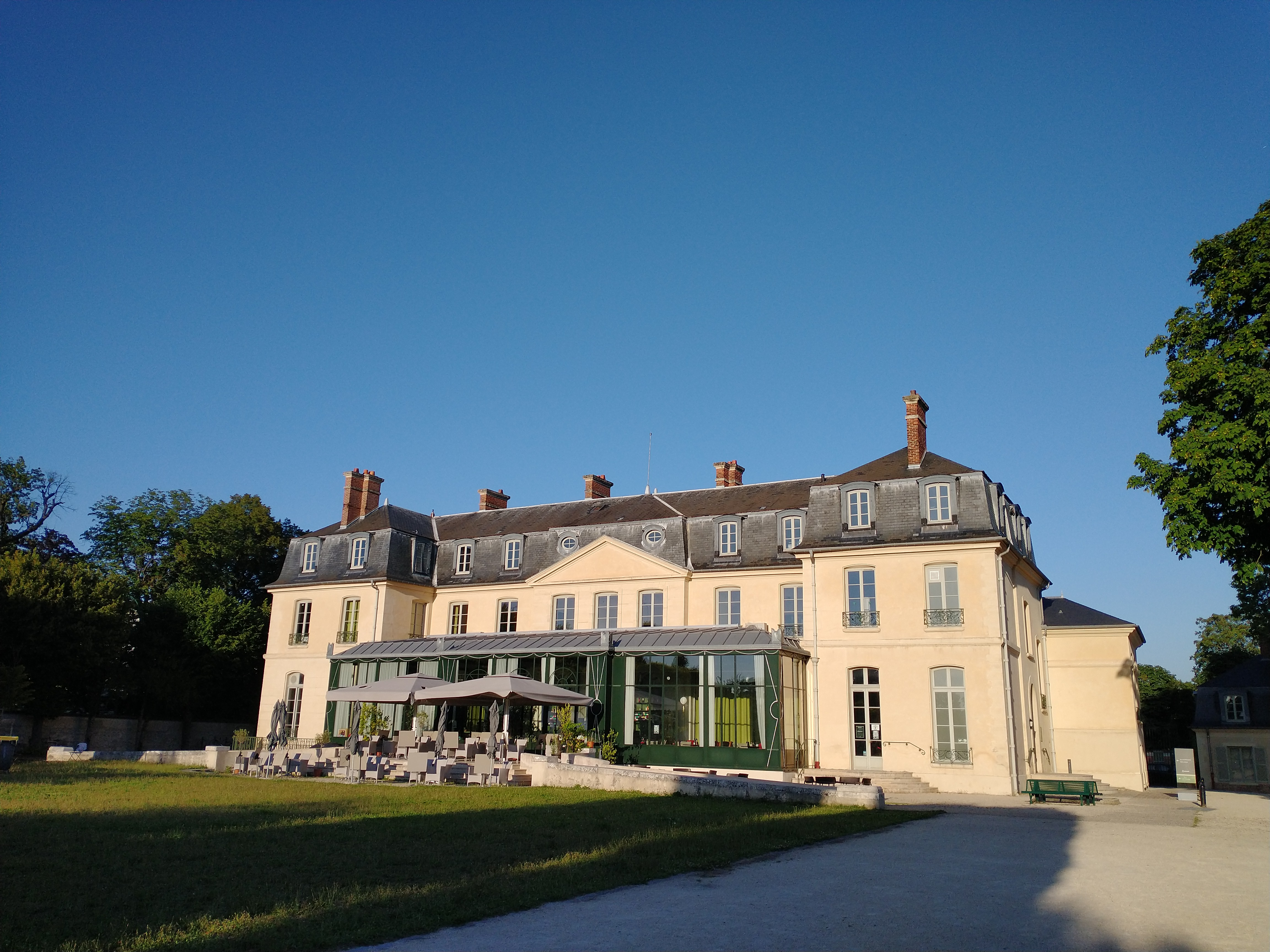
- Château de Croissy-sur-Seine

- Coat of arms
- Location of Croissy-sur-Seine
- Location within France Location within Île-de-France (region)
- Coordinates: 48°52′42″N 2°08′36″E
- Country: France
- Region: Île-de-France
- Department: Yvelines
- Arrondissement: Saint-Germain-en-Laye
- Canton: Chatou
- Intercommunality: CA Saint Germain Boucles Seine

Government
  - Mayor (2020–2026): Jean-Roger Davin
- Area^{1}: 3.44 km^{2} (1.33 sq mi)
- Elevation: 26 m (85 ft)
- Highest elevation: 34 m (112 ft)
- Lowest elevation: 19 m (62 ft)
- Population (2023): 11,013
  - Density: 3,200/km^{2} (8,290/sq mi)
- Demonym: Croissillons
- Time zone: UTC+01:00 (CET)
  - Summer (DST): UTC+02:00 (CEST)
- INSEE/Postal code: 78190 /78290
- Website: www.croissy.com
- ^{1} French Land Register data, which excludes lakes, ponds, glaciers > 1 km^{2} (0.386 sq mi or 247 acres) and river estuaries.

Croissy-sur-Seine (French pronunciation: [kʁwasi syʁ sɛn]; lit. 'Croissy-on-Seine') or simply Croissy is a commune in the Yvelines department in the Île-de-France region in Northern France. It is a suburban town on the western outskirts of Paris.

Croissy-sur-Seine is part of the Pays des Impressionnistes. It contains the two campuses of the British School of Paris, and was Russia's base camp for UEFA Euro 2016.

== Geography ==
Croissy-sur-Seine is located on the departmental border with Hauts-de-Seine on a loop of the river Seine, which forms its eastern, southern, and western boundaries. Croissy's landward neighbours are Chatou, Le Vésinet, and Le Pecq.

- Area: 3.44 km^{2} (1.33 sq mi)
- Average altitude: 26 m

== Population ==
Historical population
Year	Pop.	±% p.a.
1968	6,035	—
1975	6,845	+1.82%
1982	7,090	+0.50%
1990	9,098	+3.17%
1999	9,835	+0.87%
2007	10,100	+0.33%
2012	10,063	−0.07%
2017	9,701	−0.73%
2023	11,013	+2.14%
Source: INSEE

== Features ==
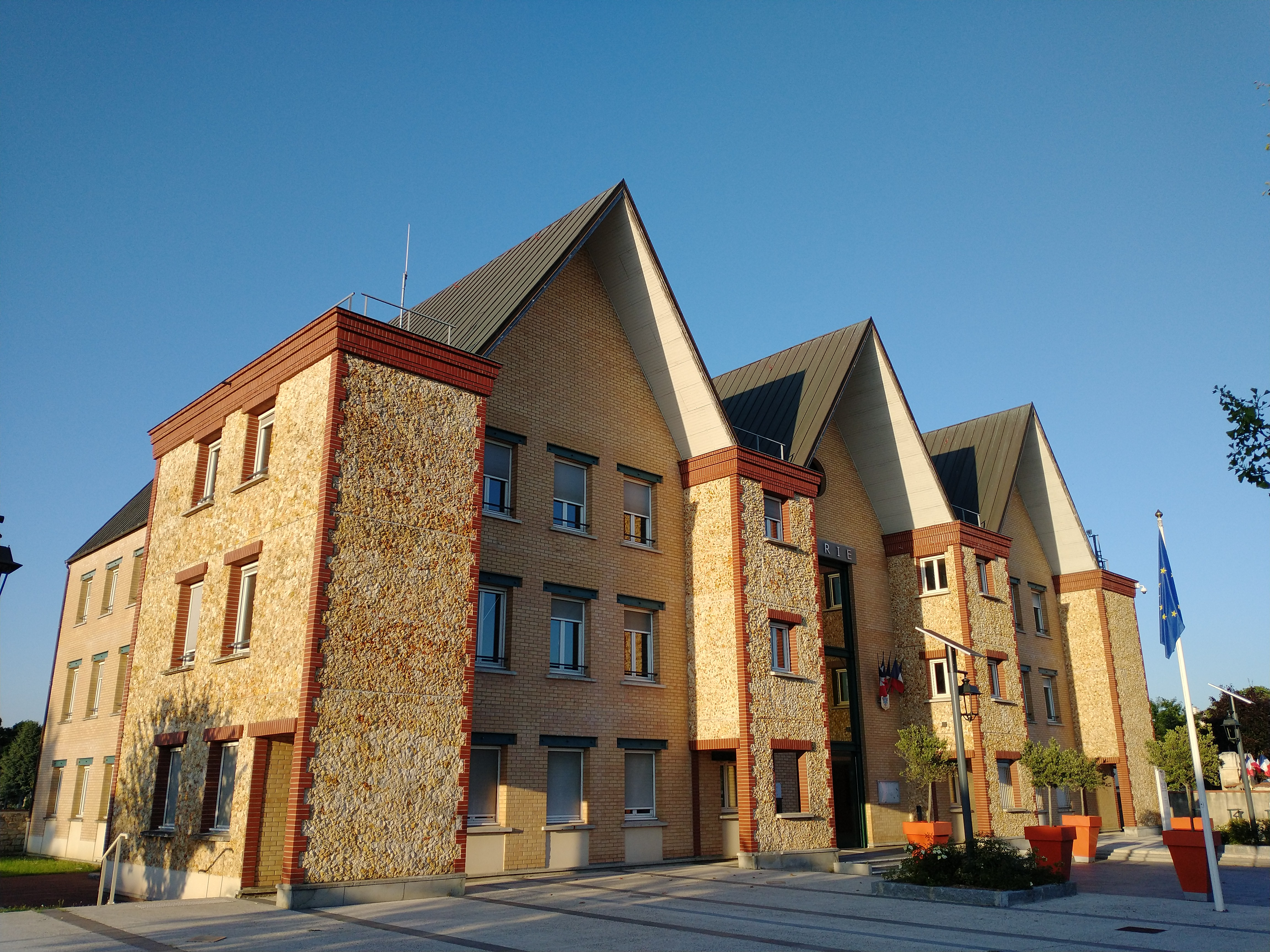
Town hall

The town centre provides a reasonable number of shops from bakeries to banks. An active morning market takes place on Fridays and Sundays.

There are several parks, some situated on the islands in the Seine. The commune is home to the 13th century chapel of St Leonard, situated near the banks of the Seine.

The Musée de la Grenouillère occupies the floating café La Grenouillère where Claude Monet and Pierre-Auguste Renoir met at the end of the summer of 1869 to paint their first Impressionist paintings. The museum presents a collection of paintings, engravings and objects. The venue also hosts exhibitions.

== Transport ==
In good traffic conditions, the centre of Paris is 20 minutes from Croissy; in daily commuting conditions, it can take up to one hour.

Croissy is not directly served by rail transportation since the commune wants to keep the area residential. The nearest RER station is Chatou–Croissy (on the RER A line St Germain branch). The nearest SNCF service is at Bougival.

== Education ==
Public schools in the commune include:

Preschools:

- Écoles maternelle Les Cerisiers
- Écoles maternelle Jean Moulin

Elementary schools:

- École primaire Jules Verne
- École primaire Leclerc

There is one public junior high school, Collège public Jean Moulin.

The British School of Paris, a private school, is located in Croissy by the Seine. It is one of the top 15 international schools.

Nearby private schools:

- École et collège Sainte-Thérèse (Bougival)
- École primaire Jeanne d'Arc Notre Dame (Chatou)
- Ecole Sainte-Jeanne d'Arc (Le Vésinet)
- Le Bon Sauveur (Le Vésinet), preschool through senior high school/sixth form college

== Personalities related to Croissy-sur-Seine ==
- Jérôme Alonzo (° 1972), footballer, when he played at Paris-Saint-Germain.
- Émile Augier (1820-1889), playwright, academician, died there.
- Daniel Authouart (° 1943), painter.
- Pierre Balmain (1914-1982), couturier.
- Paul Barras (1755-1829), conventional, member of the Executive Board.
- Josephine de Beauharnais (1763-1814), Empress of the French.
- Mathurin Jacques Brisson (1723–1806), zoologist, died in Croissy-sur-Seine.
- Jean Chanorier (1746-1806), receiver-general of finances, first mayor of Croissy in 1790, died there.
- Christian Corrêa Dionisio (° 1975), footballer, when he played at Paris-Saint-Germain.
- Anna Dartaux (1844-1887), dancer and singer, died there.
- Paul Déroulède (1846-1914), writer, politician.
- Michel Delpech (1946-2016), singer.
- Monna Delza (1882-1921), actress.
- Amélie Diéterle (1871-1941), actress.
- Louis Ganderax (1855-1941), writer, literary critic, died there.
- Ernest Goüin (1815-1885), industrialist.
- Roger Henrard (1900-1975), aerial photographer, died there.
- Jean-Michel Jarre (° 1948), composer.
- Adolphe Kégresse (1879-1943), an engineer, died there.
- Eugène Labiche (1815-1888), playwright.
- Max Lazard (1875-1953), economist and sociologist was born there.
- Pierre-Jean Mariette (1694-1794), engraver and librarian in Paris, famous art historian.
- Claude Monet (1840-1926), impressionist painter.
- Roger Pierre (1923-2010), comedian and actor.
- Anne-Marie Peysson (1935-2015), announcer, host, singer.
- Charlotte Rampling (° 1946), actress.
- Auguste Renoir (1841-1919), impressionist painter.
- Théophile Poilpot (1848-1915), academic painter.
- Albert Robida (1848-1926), illustrator, caricaturist and journalist, is buried there.
- Camille Robida (1880-1938), architect, son of the previous, is buried in a vault designed by himself.
- Claudia Victrix (1888-1976), singer and film actress.
- Raí Souza Vieira de Oliveira (° 1965), footballer, when he played at Paris-Saint-Germain.

== See also ==
- Communes of the Yvelines department
- Geneva, Illinois USA - Sister City
- Jean Chanorier
