= Hippolyte Durand =

French architect (1801–1882)

- Born: 1801; Paris, France
- Died: 1882 (aged 80–81); Paris, France
- Occupation: Architect

Hippolyte Durand (1801–1882) was a French architect who specialized in medieval-style church architecture. He restored or built many church buildings, mostly in the southwest of the country. He is perhaps best known for the Basilica of Our Lady of the Immaculate Conception at Lourdes, completed in 1872.

== Early years ==
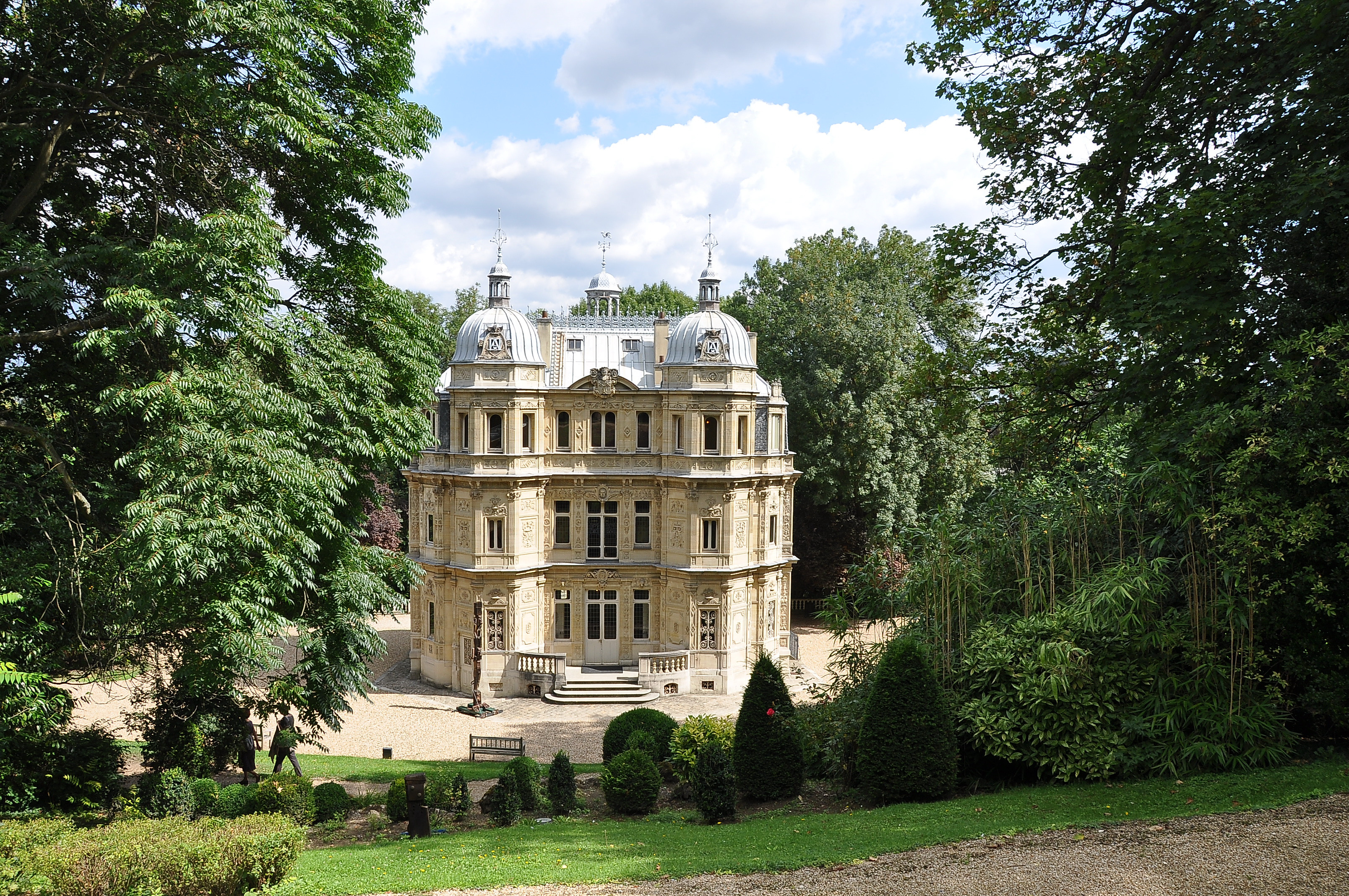
Château de Monte-Cristo at Le Port-Marly, Yvelines

Hippolyte Durand was born in Paris in 1801. He attended the École des Beaux-Arts in Paris, where he was a student of Vaudoyer and Lebas. He won a departmental prize in 1829 and a medal in 1830. He became a specialist in medieval architecture.

Durand worked on restoration of the Basilica of Saint-Remi in Reims, submitting a monograph on the subject to the Salon of 1837. He also submitted papers to the Salon on Notre-Dame de l'Épine near Châlons-sur-Marne (1838) and the church of Saint-Menoux in the Bourbonnais (1841). In 1842 Durand began to build the neo-classical theater of Moulins. During the years that followed he laid out various projects for construction of medieval-style religious buildings, presenting them at the Salon of 1845. He believed in the superiority of medieval art over classical art in medieval architecture, since it represented a revolution in thought about architecture.

In 1846 Alexandre Dumas, enriched by the success of The Three Musketeers and The Count of Monte Cristo, selected Durand as architect to build the home of his dreams, the Château de Monte-Cristo at Le Port-Marly, Yvelines. It was to be a retreat from the city where the author could work in peace. There were two buildings: a renaissance-style château facing a gothic castle surrounded by water. They were formally opened on 25 July 1847.

== Diocesan architect ==
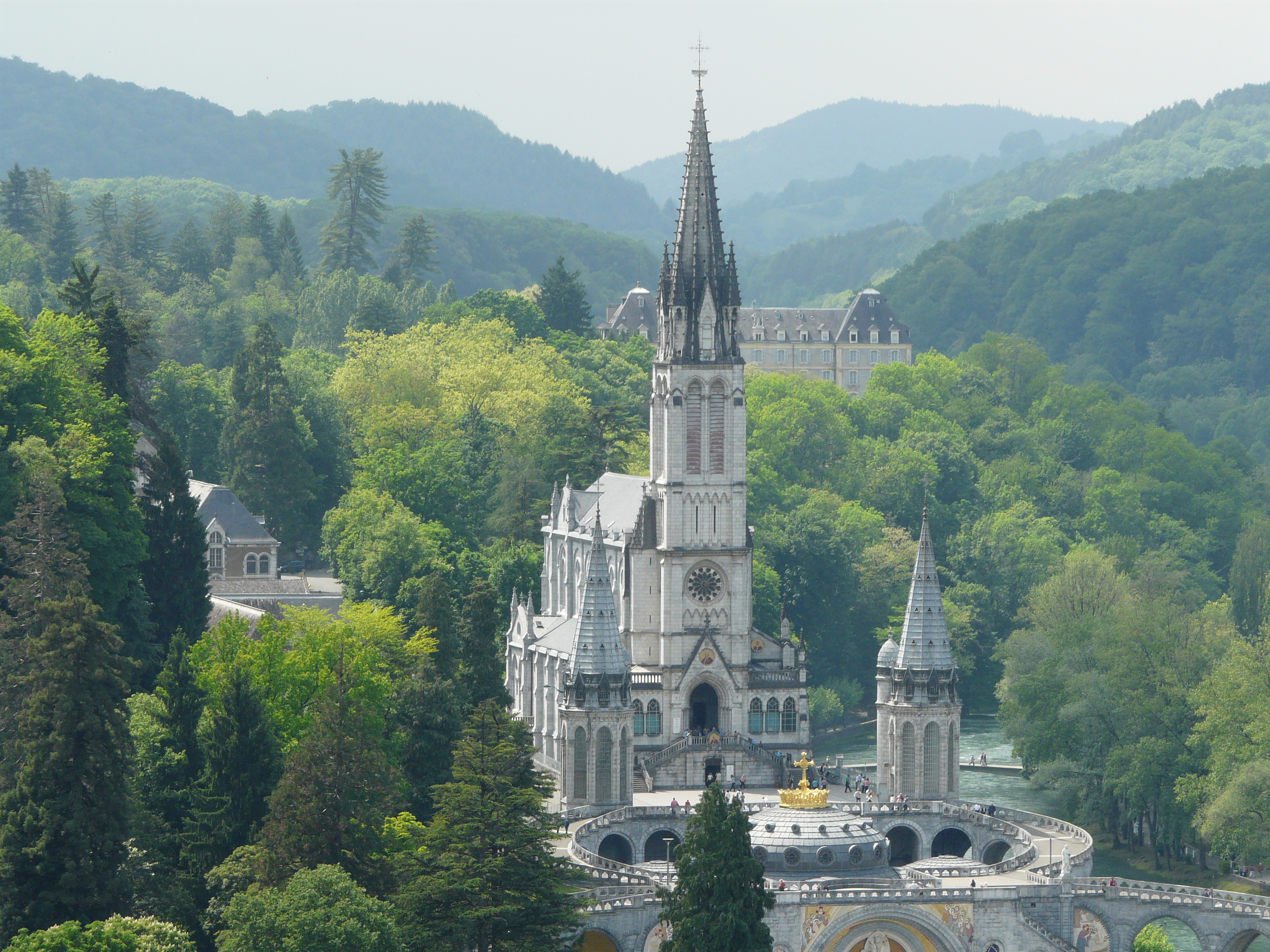
Basilica of Our Lady of the Immaculate Conception at Lourdes

In 1848, due to Durand's reputation as a Gothic revival architect, he was selected as architect of the diocese of Bayonne. In 1849 he took over responsibility for supervising construction at the Cathédrale Sainte-Marie in Bayonne from Hippolyte Guichenné, although Guichenné remained responsible for inspecting the work. He resigned from his position with the diocese of Bayonne on 10 February 1852 after a dispute with the bishop, who accused him of bad temper and haughty and insolent manners. Durand became architect of the dioceses of Auch (department of Gers) and Tarbes (department of Hautes-Pyrénées).

In 1853 the emperor Napoleon III gave Durand the job of building a summer home in Biarritz for the imperial family, the Villa Eugénie. Construction began in 1854. Durand lived in Bayonne and Biarritz during this period, which created difficulties with the prefects of Hautes-Pyrénées and Gers, who considered him negligent of his duties. It was said of him at this time that he was hard working, and worked well, but lacked method and had difficulty dealing with the authorities. Durand was abruptly dismissed from the Villa Eugénie project in June 1855 and replaced by the twenty-seven-year-old architect Louis-Auguste Couvrechef.

Durand built the church of Saint-André de Bayonne between 1853 and 1862 in collaboration with the Basque architect Hippolyte Guichenné. He built the Priory of the Ursulines in Auch, the Church of Saint-Michel in Condom, Gers, and the churches of Peyrehorade, Soustons and Tartas. He was responsible for the realization of the Basilica of Our Lady of the Immaculate Conception at Lourdes, completed in 1872 and submitted to the Salon the same year. In 1868 the Bishop of Tarbes tried to get Durand admitted to the Legion of Honor for the quality his work in building the Tarbes seminary. After some delay, he was awarded the Legion of Honor in 1875.

Hippolyte Durand died in Paris in 1882, aged about 81.
