= Le Port-Marly =

- Commune
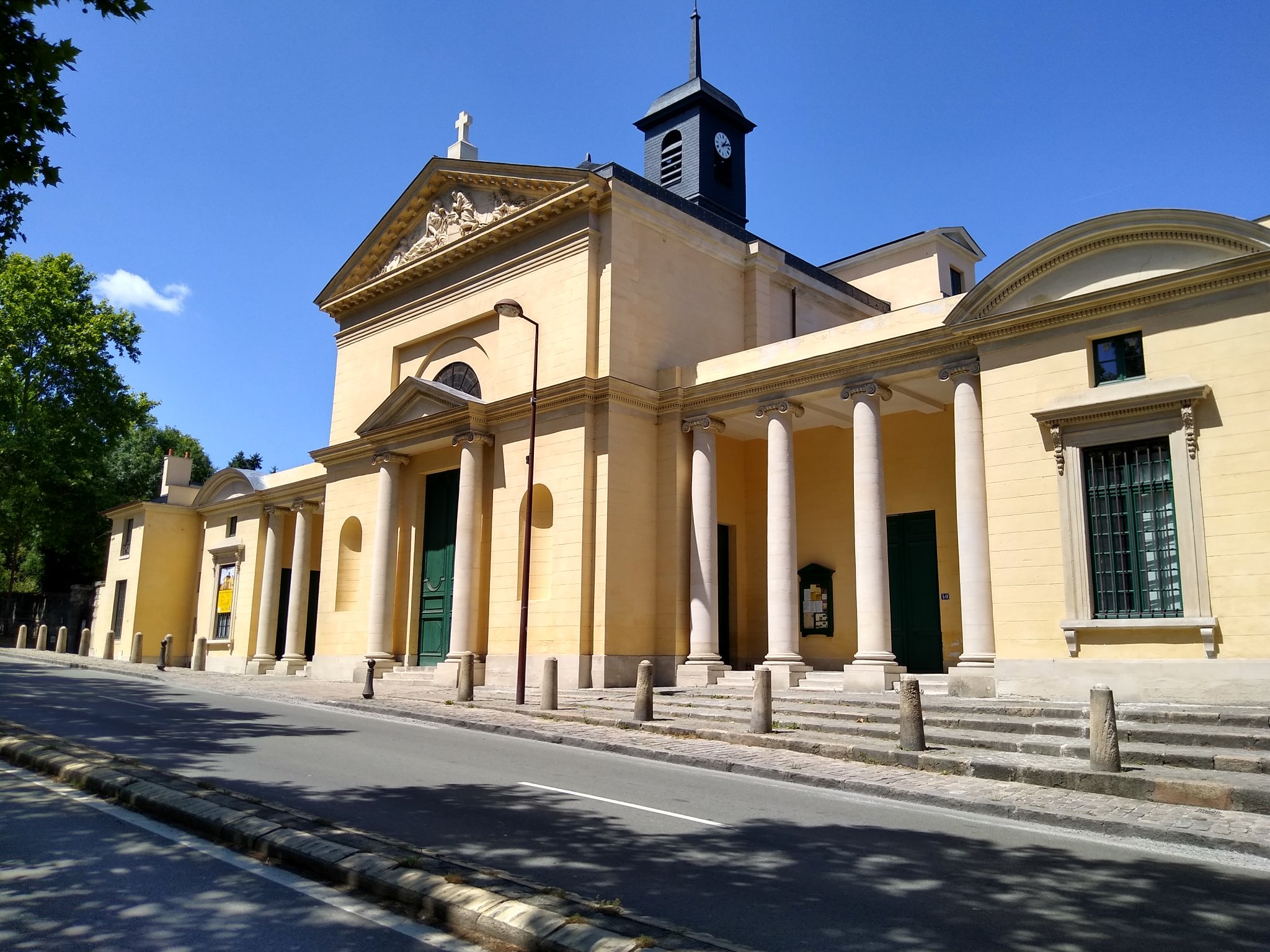
- Église Saint-Louis in Le Port-Marly

- Coat of arms
- Location of Le Port-Marly
- Location within France Location within Île-de-France (region)
- Coordinates: 48°53′48″N 2°06′38″E
- Country: France
- Region: Île-de-France
- Department: Yvelines
- Arrondissement: Saint-Germain-en-Laye
- Canton: Chatou
- Intercommunality: CA Saint Germain Boucles Seine

Government
  - Mayor (2020–2026): Cédric Pemba-Marine (MoDem)
- Area^{1}: 1.44 km^{2} (0.56 sq mi)
- Elevation: 24 m (79 ft)
- Highest elevation: 108 m (354 ft)
- Lowest elevation: 22 m (72 ft)
- Population (2023): 5,559
  - Density: 3,860/km^{2} (10,000/sq mi)
- Time zone: UTC+01:00 (CET)
  - Summer (DST): UTC+02:00 (CEST)
- INSEE/Postal code: 78502 /78560
- ^{1} French Land Register data, which excludes lakes, ponds, glaciers > 1 km^{2} (0.386 sq mi or 247 acres) and river estuaries.

Le Port-Marly (French pronunciation: [lə pɔʁ maʁli]) is a commune in the outer western suburbs of Paris, France. It is located in the Yvelines department in the Île-de-France region, north of Versailles. It is part of the Pays des Impressionnistes.

== Population ==
Historical population
Year	Pop.	±% p.a.
1968	4,331	—
1975	3,921	−1.41%
1982	3,518	−1.54%
1990	4,181	+2.18%
1999	4,412	+0.60%
2007	4,623	+0.59%
2012	5,089	+1.94%
2017	5,532	+1.68%
2023	5,559	+0.08%
Source: INSEE

== See also ==
- Château de Monte-Cristo
- Communes of the Yvelines department
