= Aqueduc de Louveciennes =

17th-century aqueduct near Paris

- Coordinates: 48.86300°N 2.10962°E

Characteristics
- Total length: 643 m
- Width: 2–4.4 m
- Height: 10–20 m
- Capacity: 3,200 m^{3} / day

History
- Construction start: 1681
- Opened: 1685
- Closed: 1866

Location
- Interactive map of Aqueduc de Louveciennes

L'Aqueduc de Marly painted by Alfred Sisley in 1874. View of the tour du Levant from the hillside above the Seine river.

The Aqueduc de Louveciennes (French pronunciation: [akdyk də luv(ə)sjɛn]; Louveciennes Aqueduct), sometimes called the Aqueduc de Marly (Marly Aqueduct), is an aqueduct built in the 17th century under the reign of Louis XIV, located in Louveciennes (now in the Yvelines department, in the western suburbs of Paris). Now out of service, the aqueduct has been listed a monument historique since 1953. It was a part of the hydraulic network intended to provide water for the Château de Marly and the Gardens of Versailles from the Seine river, using a huge pump called the Machine de Marly.

The aqueduct consists of 36 arches. Its length is 643m for a width varying from 2 to 4.4m, and a height from 10 to 20 metres.

== History ==
It was built by Jules Hardouin-Mansard, then Robert de Cotte, from 1681 to 1685. A monumental machine, called the machine de Marly, situated on the Seine river at Bougival, pumped water out of the river with the help of 14 paddle wheels. By pipes put on two paved inclines, the water was pumped up the 126 metres of the hill of Louveciennes. The water flowed into the reservoir at the summit of the tour du Levant ("East tower") at the north-eastern end of the aqueduct. Using gravity by a one metre wide and two metres deep canal, sealed inside with lead, the water was directed toward the tour du Jongleur ("tower of the Juggler") at the southern end of the aqueduct. From there, a siphon ensured the supply of a reservoir called réservoir des Deux Portes and the nearby tanks of Marly and Louveciennes.

The aqueduct was retired from service in 1866 and replaced by underground pipes.

During the Siege of Paris (1870-1871), the tour du Levant was used as an observation point by the future German emperor Wilhelm I and the chancellor Bismarck. This tower was renovated between 1998 and 2000.

== Gallery ==
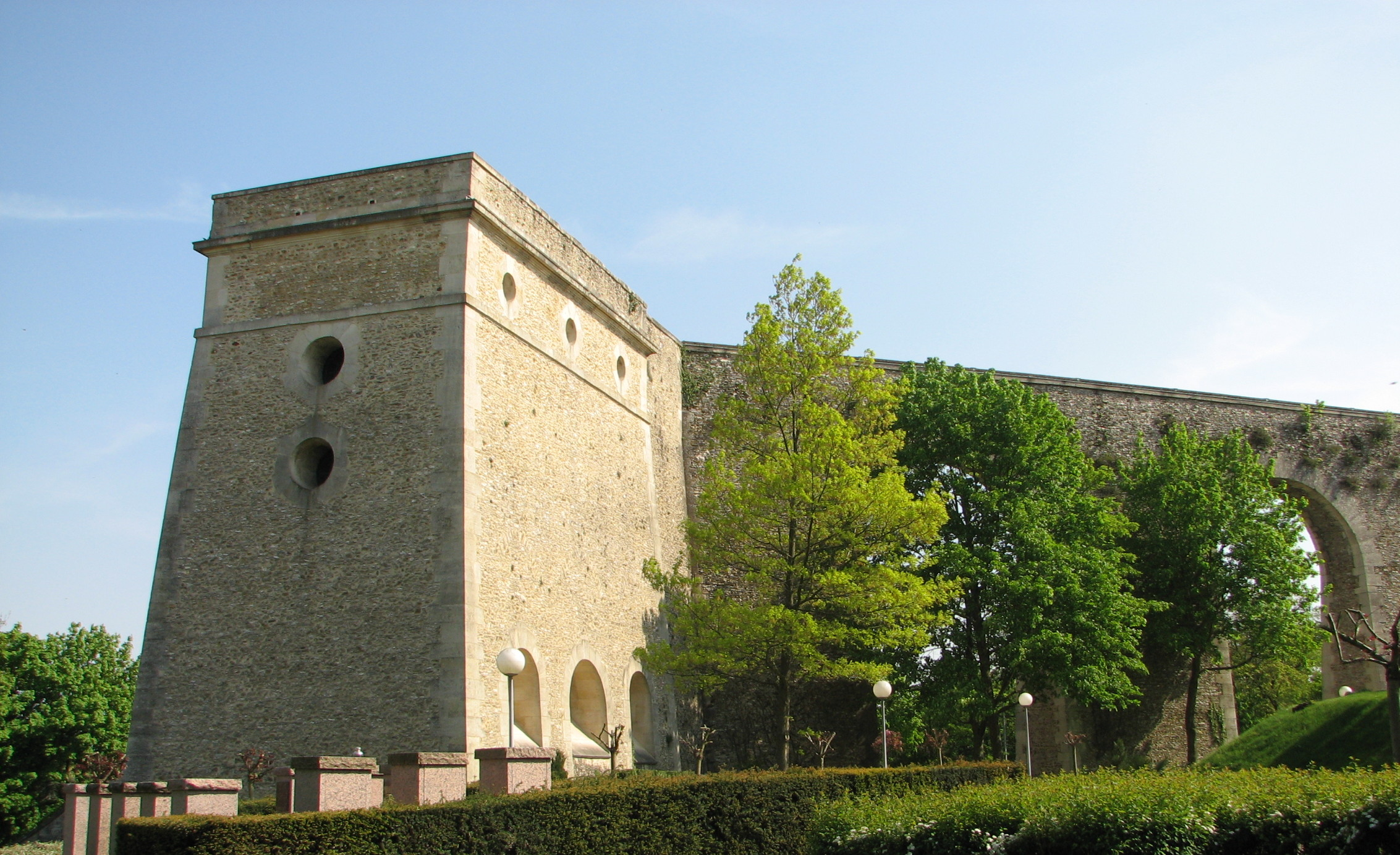
La tour du Levant, at the northern end and where the water came from the Machine de Marly.

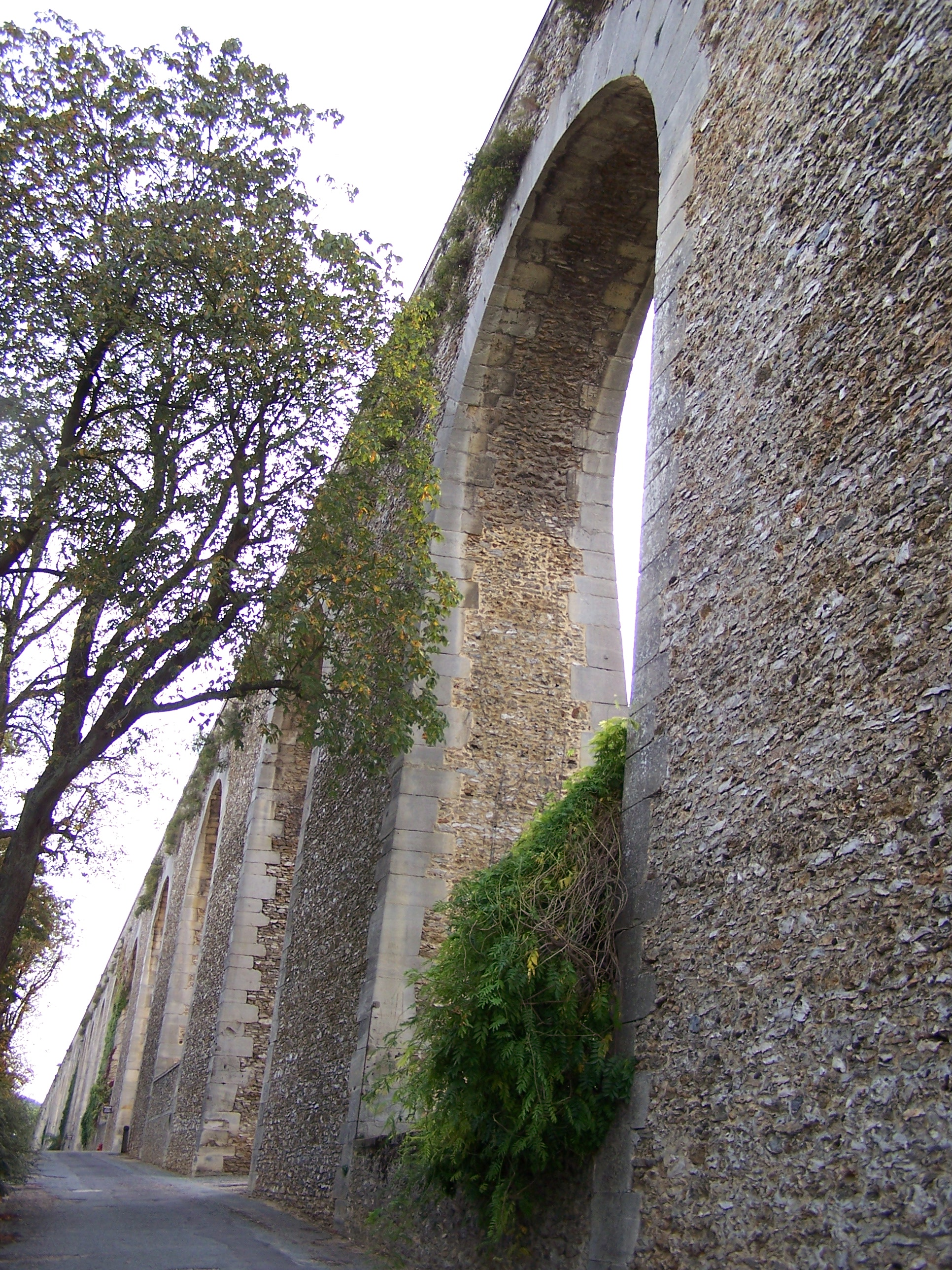
Arches of the aqueduct, north-east side, not far away from the tour du Levant.

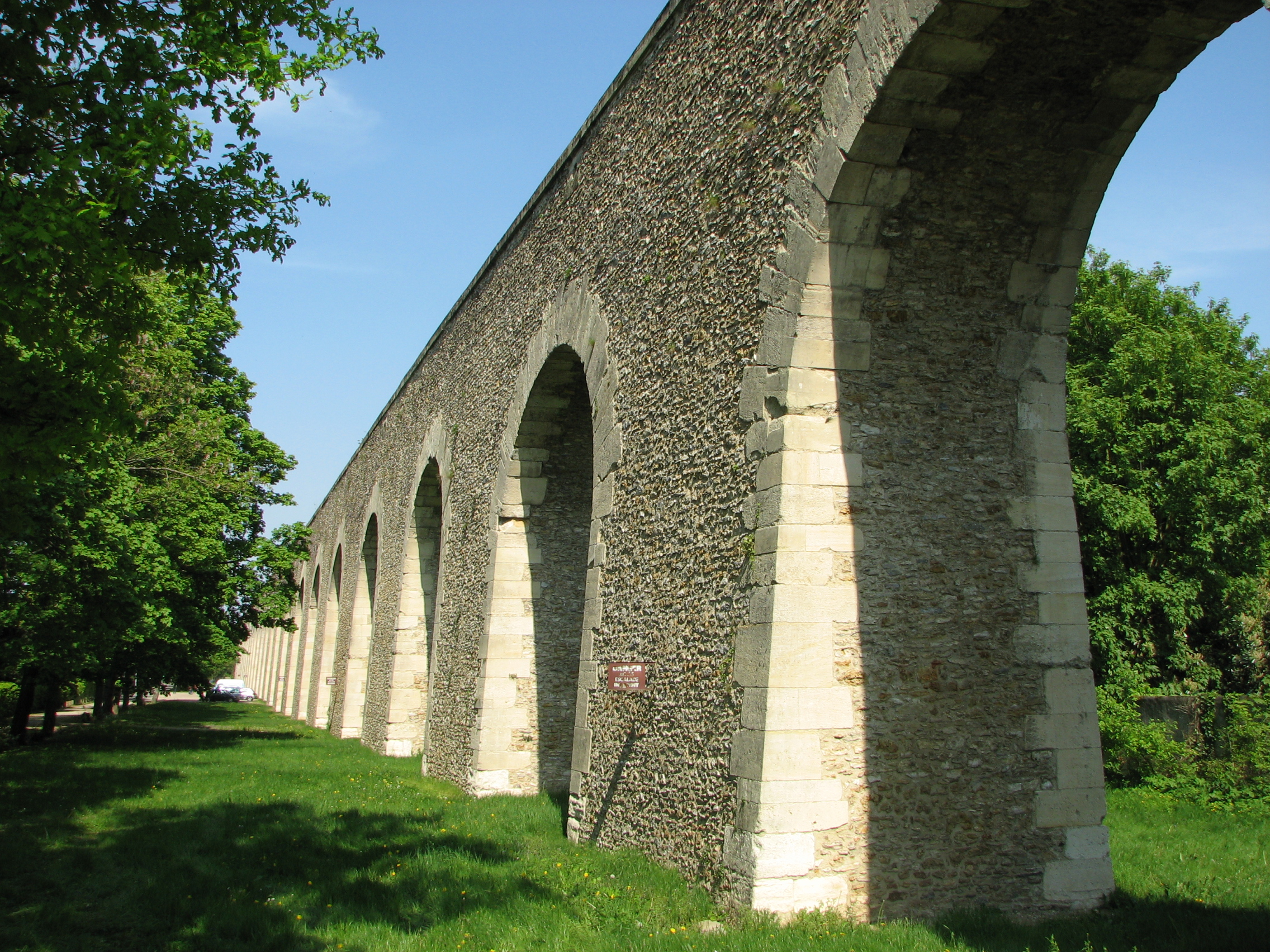
Arches on the south-east side, not far away from the tour du Jongleur.

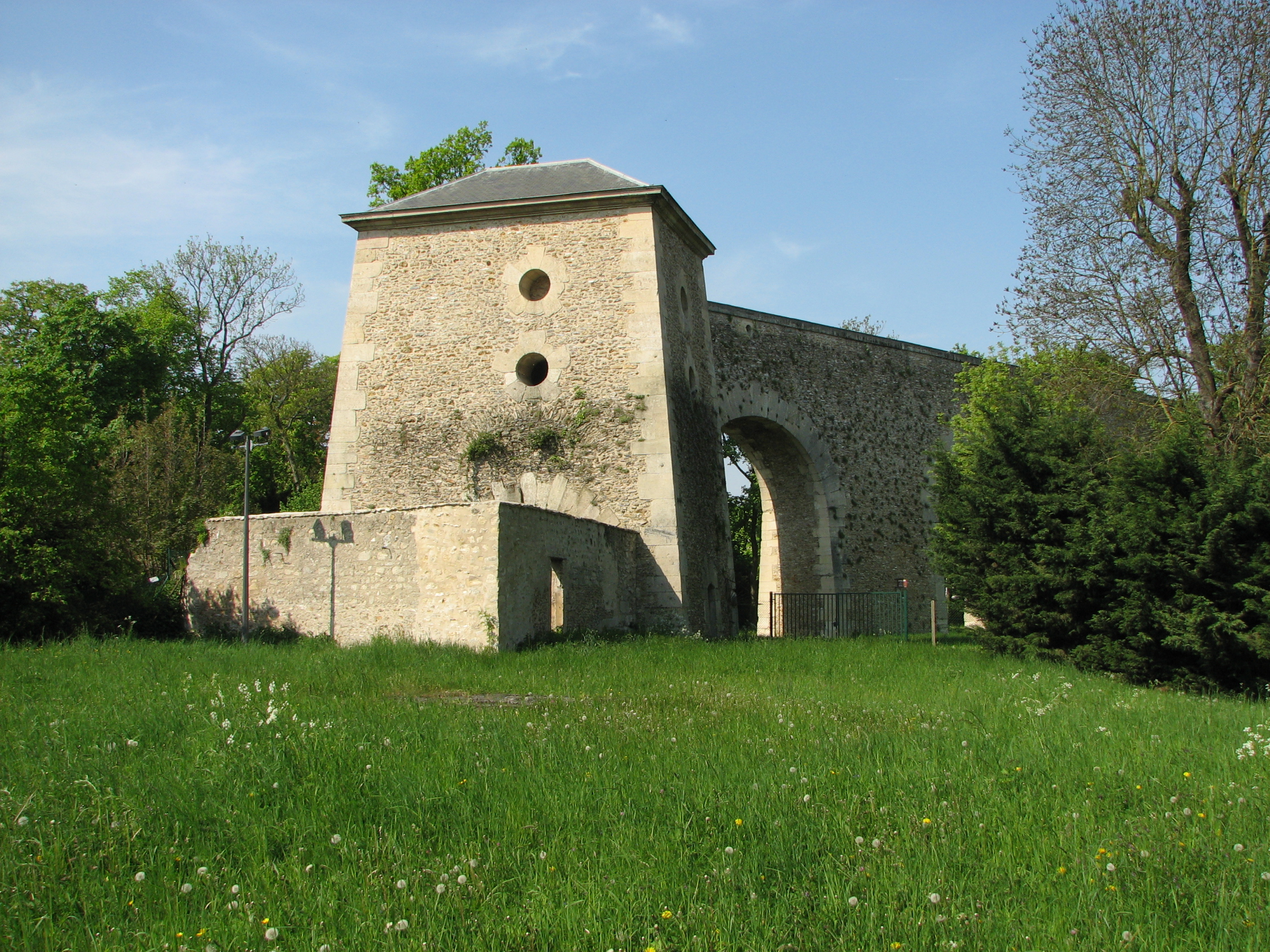
La tour du Jongleur, at the south end where a siphon brought water to the tanks of Marly and Louveciennes.

== See also ==
- List of aqueducts

== Sources ==
- Translation of the French article
