= Rennequin Sualem =

Rennequin Sualem (1645 − 1708) was a Walloon carpenter and engineer born on 29 January 1645 in Jemeppe-sur-Meuse, in what now is Wallonia, Belgium. His given name sometimes appears as 'Renkin'.

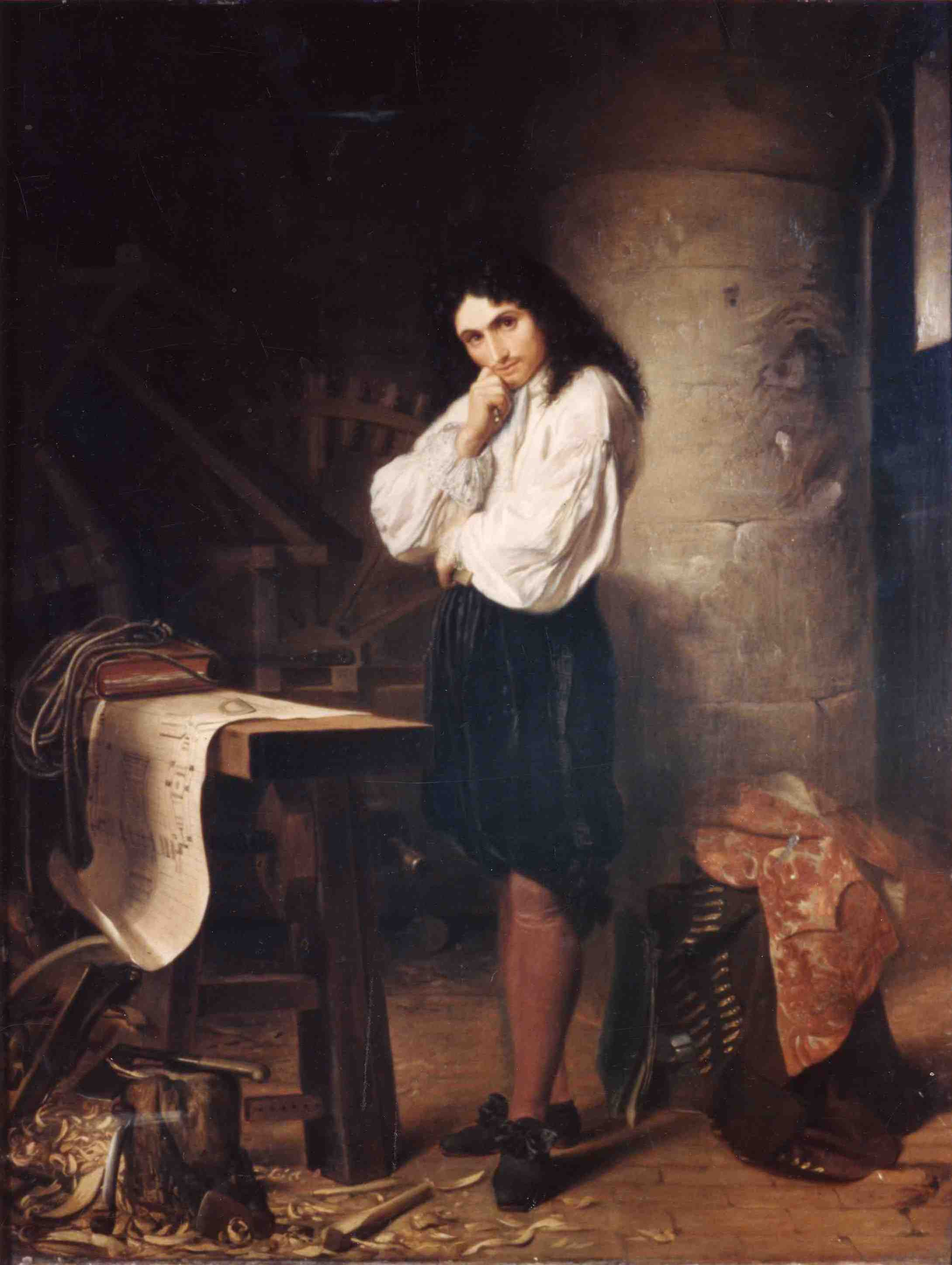
Portrait of Rennequin Sualem attributed to Le Brun

== Achievements ==
In 1667−68 the lieutenant-governor of the castle of Huy ordered the building of an hydraulic machine to pump up the water of the Hoyoux river to his castle in Modave, 50 m (160 ft) higher. Rennequin Sualem was commissioned to build the mechanism.

In 1678 the French king Louis XIV called for a competition to construct an effective pump system to bring water from the nearby Seine river to his chateaux at Versailles and Marly in order to supply the fountains there, and Sualem resolved to present his model, a scaled-up version of his pump system at Hoyoux.

The presentations by the other inventors were so unconvincing that the king had decided to discontinue the competition and was about to leave the room, but Sualem managed to persuade him to stay to hear his plan. When he presented his imposing wooden model he impressed the king with his detailed description of its operation, and convinced that Sualem understood the problem to be tackled, Louis XIV commissioned him to immediately begin construction.

The resulting huge Machine de Marly, engineered by Arnold de Ville, lifted the waters from the Seine to the Versailles palace, in this case 150 m (490 ft) higher. The machine included 14 paddlewheels to power over 200 pumps that forced water up a network of pipes to an aqueduct. It took 30 years to complete in 1684 and remained in use until 1817 before subsequent modifications.

Rennequin also built a pump for a coal mine at Decize. He died in Bougival, France in 1708, at the Marly machine.

== Homage ==
- Quai Rennequin Sualem in Bougival
- Rue Renkin in Brussels
- Rue Rennequin in Paris
- Rue Rennequin Sualem in Liège
- Haute École Rennequin Sualem in Liège
