= Bougival =

- Commune
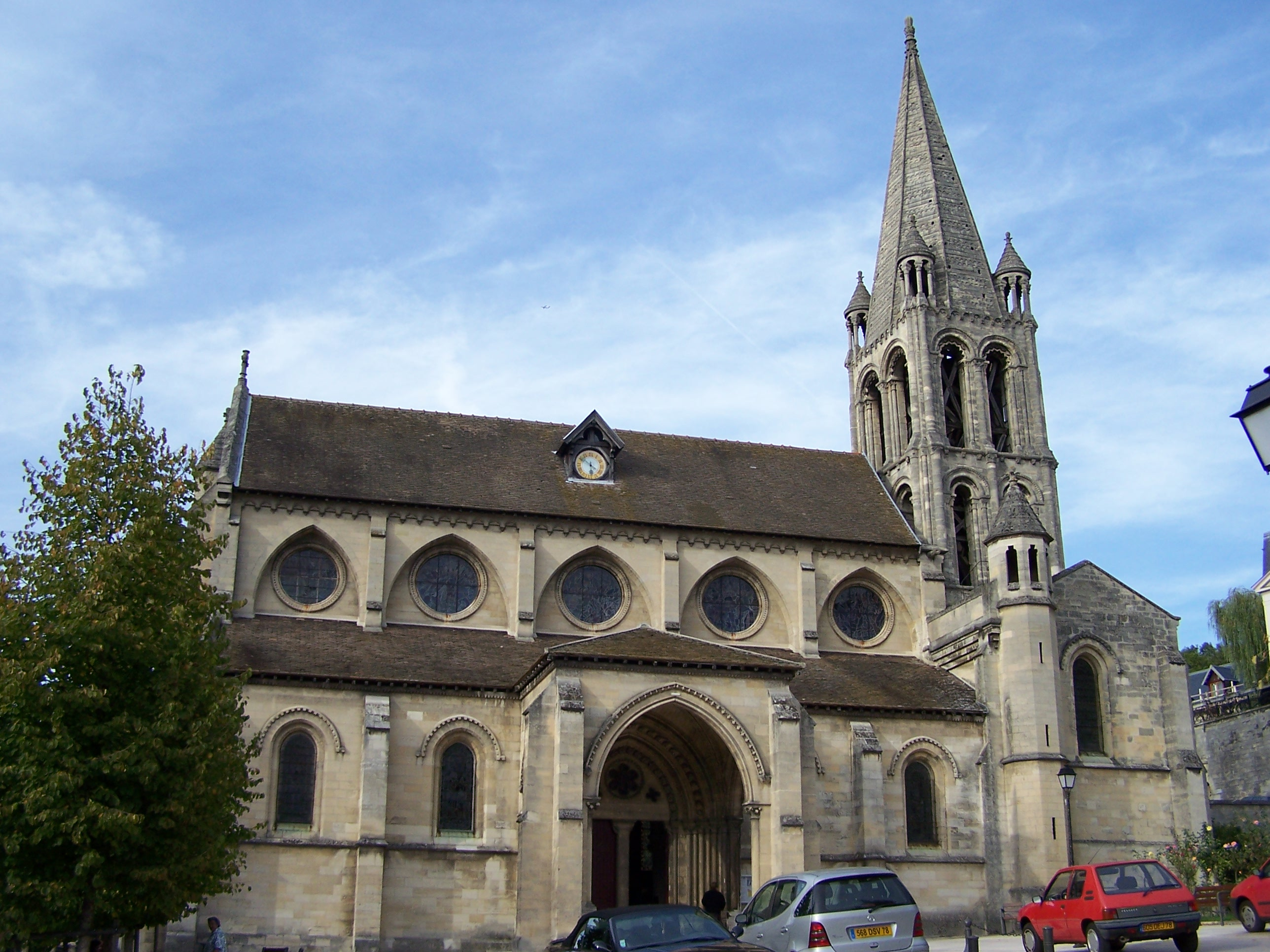
- 12th-century Notre-Dame Church

- Coat of arms

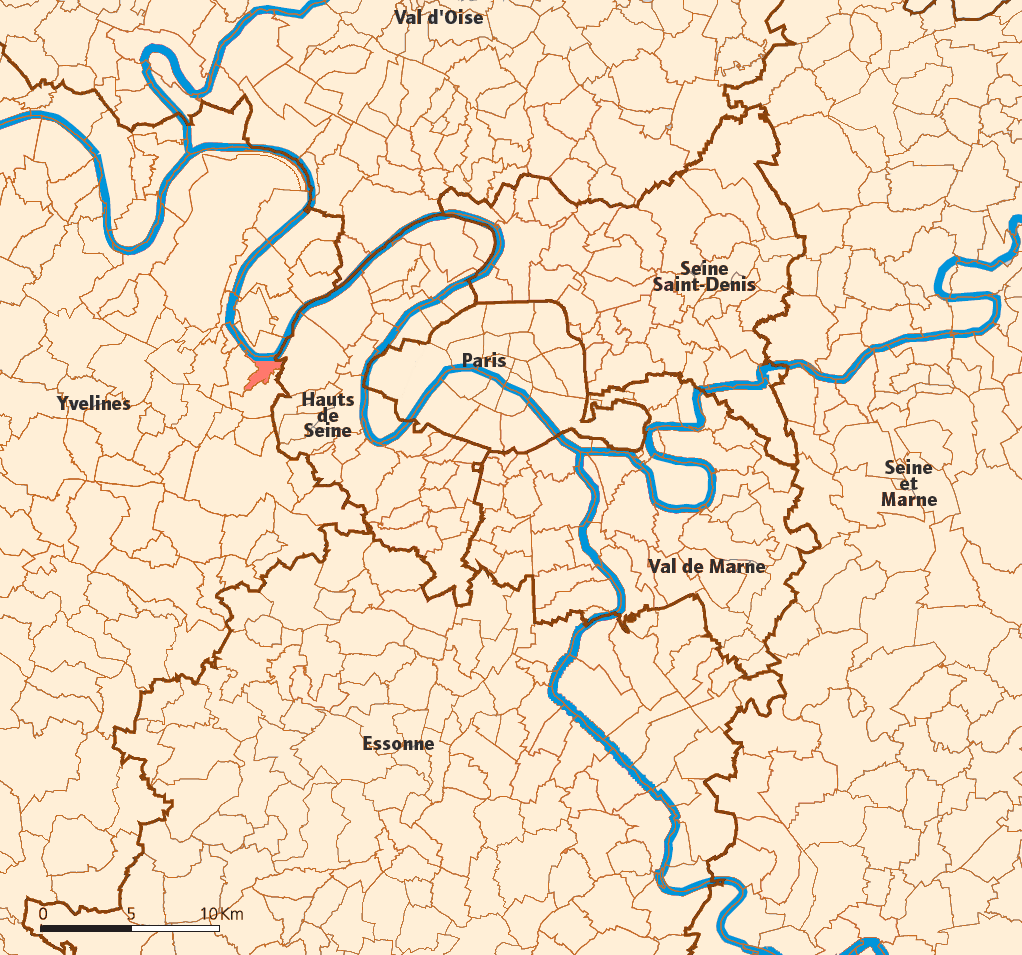
- Location (in red) within Paris inner and outer suburbs
- Location of Bougival
- Location within France Location within Île-de-France (region)
- Coordinates: 48°52′00″N 2°08′00″E
- Country: France
- Region: Île-de-France
- Department: Yvelines
- Arrondissement: Versailles
- Canton: Le Chesnay-Rocquencourt
- Intercommunality: CA Versailles Grand Parc

Government
  - Mayor (2020–2026): Luc Wattelle
- Area^{1}: 2.76 km^{2} (1.07 sq mi)
- Highest elevation: 166 m (545 ft)
- Lowest elevation: 23 m (75 ft)
- Population (2023): 9,134
  - Density: 3,310/km^{2} (8,570/sq mi)
- Demonym: Bougivalais
- Time zone: UTC+01:00 (CET)
  - Summer (DST): UTC+02:00 (CEST)
- INSEE/Postal code: 78092 /78380
- Website: www.ville-bougival.fr
- ^{1} French Land Register data, which excludes lakes, ponds, glaciers > 1 km^{2} (0.386 sq mi or 247 acres) and river estuaries.

Bougival (French pronunciation: [buʒival]) is a suburban commune in the Yvelines department in the Île-de-France region in northern France. It is 15.3 km (9.5 mi) west from the centre of Paris, on the left bank of the Seine, on the departmental border with Hauts-de-Seine.

As the site where many of the Impressionists (including Claude Monet, Alfred Sisley, Berthe Morisot and Pierre-Auguste Renoir) painted country scenes along the Seine, the town today hosts a series of six historical placards, known as the "Impressionists Walk", at locations from which the noted painters depicted the scenes of Bougival. It is part of the Pays des Impressionnistes.

Bougival is also noted as the site of the former Machine de Marly, a sprawling, complicated hydraulic pumping device that began supplying the massive quantity of water required by the fountains at Palace of Versailles in the late 17th century. Considered one of the foremost engineering accomplishments of its era, the cacophonous, breakdown-prone apparatus comprised fourteen waterwheels (approximately 38 feet in diameter) driven by the current of the Seine — in turn powering more than 250 pumps, delivering water up a 500-foot vertical rise through a series of pumping stations, holding tanks, reservoirs, pipes and mechanical linkages. In use until 1817, the machine was subsequently updated, replaced with another pumping building in 1858 and finally replaced by an electrical generator in 1963. The building itself remained until 1968. Remnants are visible today at the riverbank.

In Bougival, Georges Bizet composed the opera Carmen at his home on Rue Ivan Tourguenievf on the Seine, close to where Russian novelist and playwright Ivan Turgenev had a dacha built, named Les Frênes (current-day Villa Viardot). A local monument commemorates the Montgolfier brothers, pioneers of flight; the commune hosts the annual Festival of Bougival et des Coteaux de Seine.

== History ==
In the 19th century, Bougival emerged as a fashionable suburb of Paris. Pauline Viardot had a villa there, as did her paramour Ivan Turgenev, who died in the town in 1883. Bougival was also known as the "Cradle of Impressionism" during the Belle Époque. Painters Monet, Pierre-Auguste Renoir, and Sisley among others painted the light, sky, and water of this area. Alexandre Dumas, fils set parts of his novel The Lady of the Camellias in Bougival.

The Junior division of the British School of Paris (formerly the English School of Paris) was located in Bougival up until 2008. Prior to the English School, it was a Catholic all-girls school called Marymount in the 1960s. It was reported that the Germans occupied the estate during World War II, along with the nuns that lived there, due to the estate's vantage point of the Seine River. Rennequin Sualem

== Demographics ==
Historical population
Year	Pop.	±% p.a.
1968	8,444	—
1975	8,599	+0.26%
1982	8,473	−0.21%
1990	8,552	+0.12%
1999	8,432	−0.16%
2007	8,416	−0.02%
2012	8,498	+0.19%
2017	8,699	+0.47%
2023	9,134	+0.82%
Source: INSEE

== Transport ==
Bougival is served by Bougival station on the Transilien Paris-Saint-Lazare suburban rail line. This station is located at the border between the commune of Bougival and the commune of La Celle-Saint-Cloud, on the La Celle-Saint-Cloud side of the border.

Two multiple locks on the River Seine are located in Bougival.

== Education ==
Schools in Bougival include:

Public preschools:

- Ecole maternelle Monet
- Ecole maternelle Peintre Gérôme

Public elementary schools:

- Ecole élémentaire Claude Monet
- Ecole élémentaire Auguste Renoir

There is a private school, Ecole privée Sainte-Thérèse/Collège privée Sainte Thérèse, that goes from preschool through junior high school level 3e.

Nearby public secondary schools:

Junior high schools:

- Collège Jean Moulin – Croissy-sur-Seine
- Collège Victor Hugo – La Celle-Saint-Cloud
- Collège Pasteur – La Celle-Saint-Cloud
- Collège Pierre et Marie Curie – Le Pecq

Senior high schools/sixth form colleges:

- Lycée Corneille (La Celle Saint Cloud)

The Bibliothèque Emile Richebourg is the community's public library.

== Notable residents ==
Rennequin Sualem, inventor of the Marly Machine, died in Bougival in 1708. Ivan Turgenev died in Bougival in 1883, as well as Georges Bizet in 1875. Pauline Viardot made Bougival her home. Gabrielle d'Estrées had a château there (destroyed in the 19th century).

The town has since been home to noted residents including Guillaume Depardieu, Jean-Louis Aubert, Michel Rocard, Laurent Garnier, Jean-Marie Hullot, Jean Michel Jarre, Benjamin Castaldi, Neymar, Charles-Louis Havas and Gilbert Montagné have been residents of Bougival.

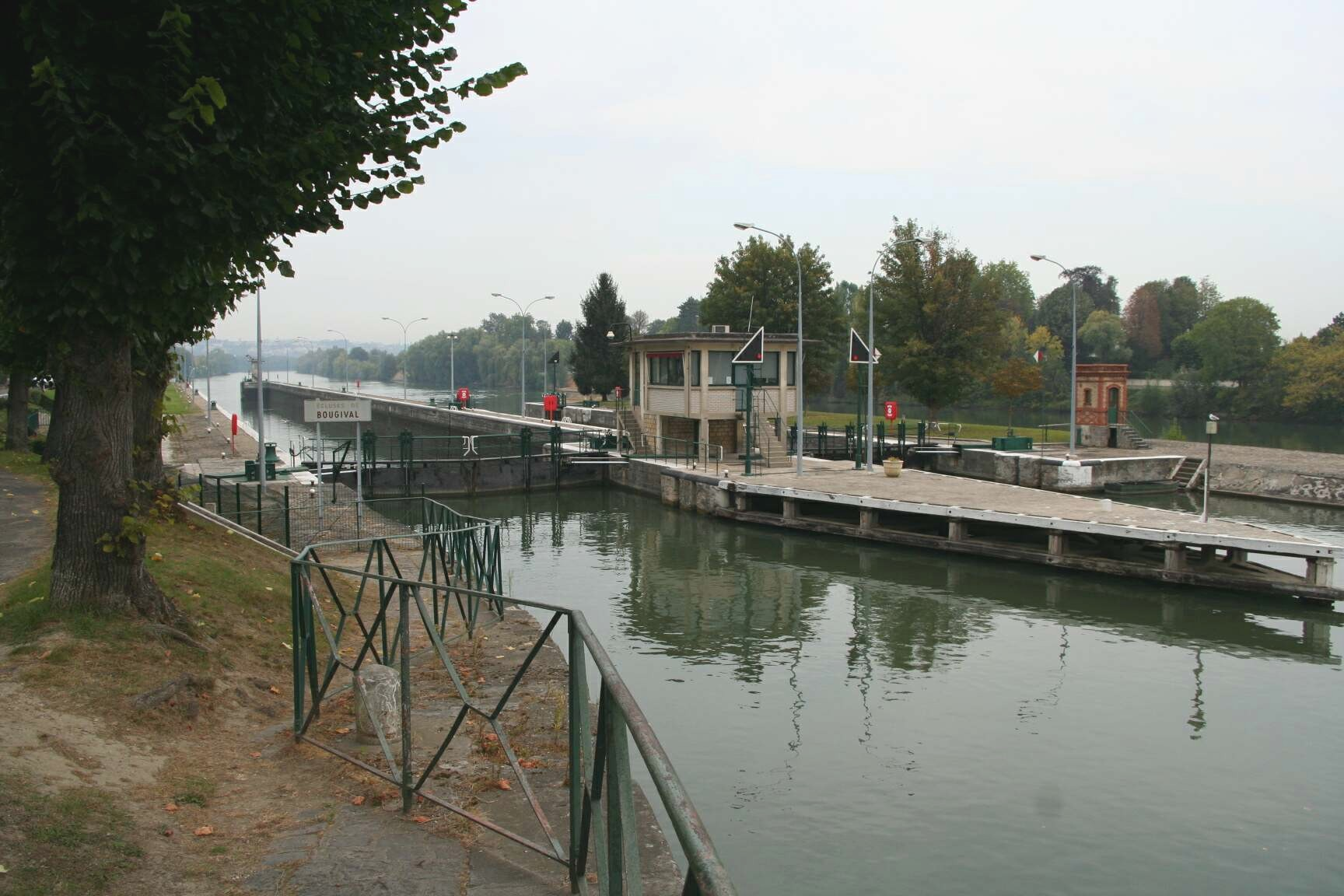
The locks of the River Seine at Bougival

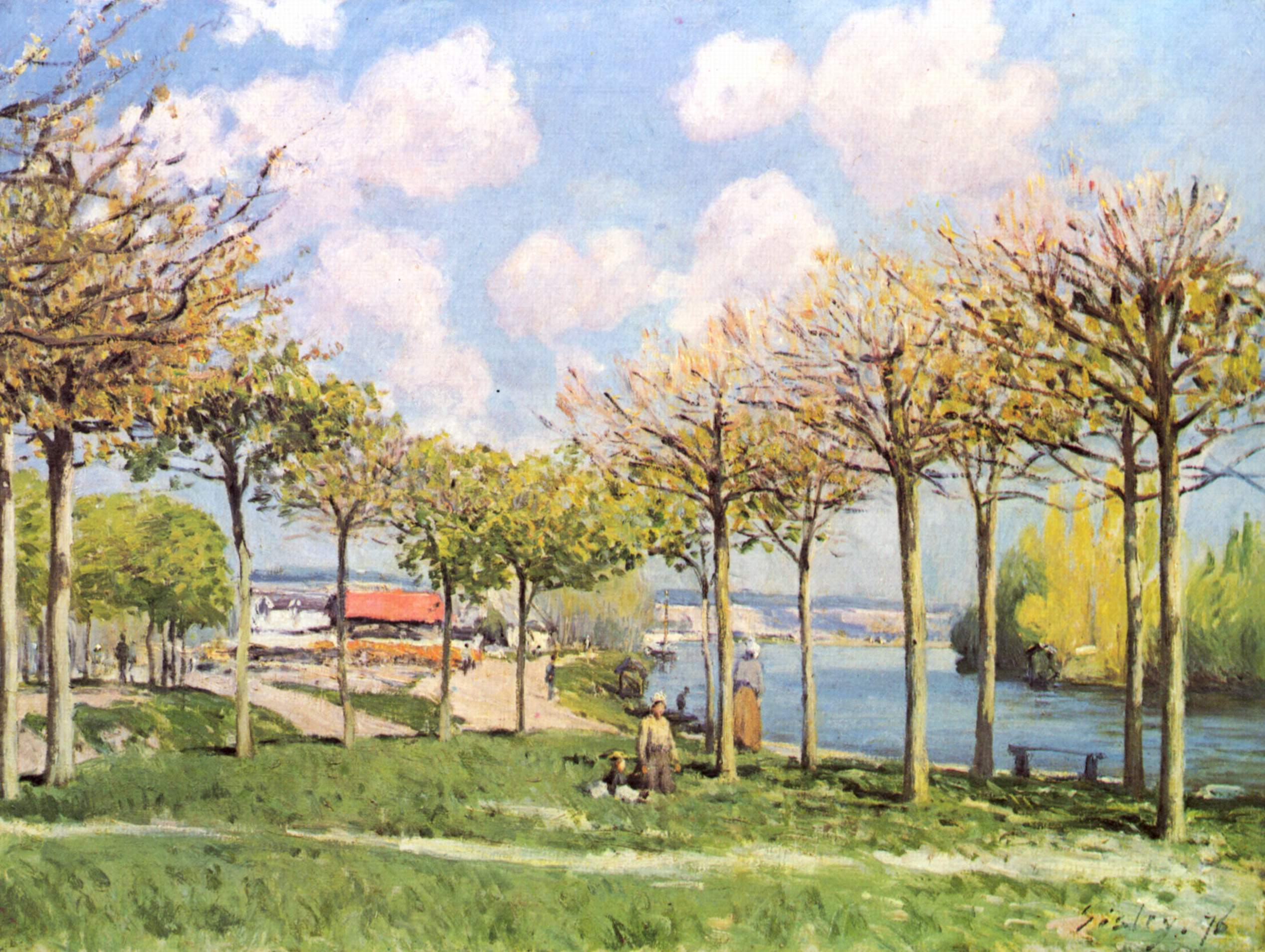
The Seine at Bougival, painted by Alfred Sisley in 1876

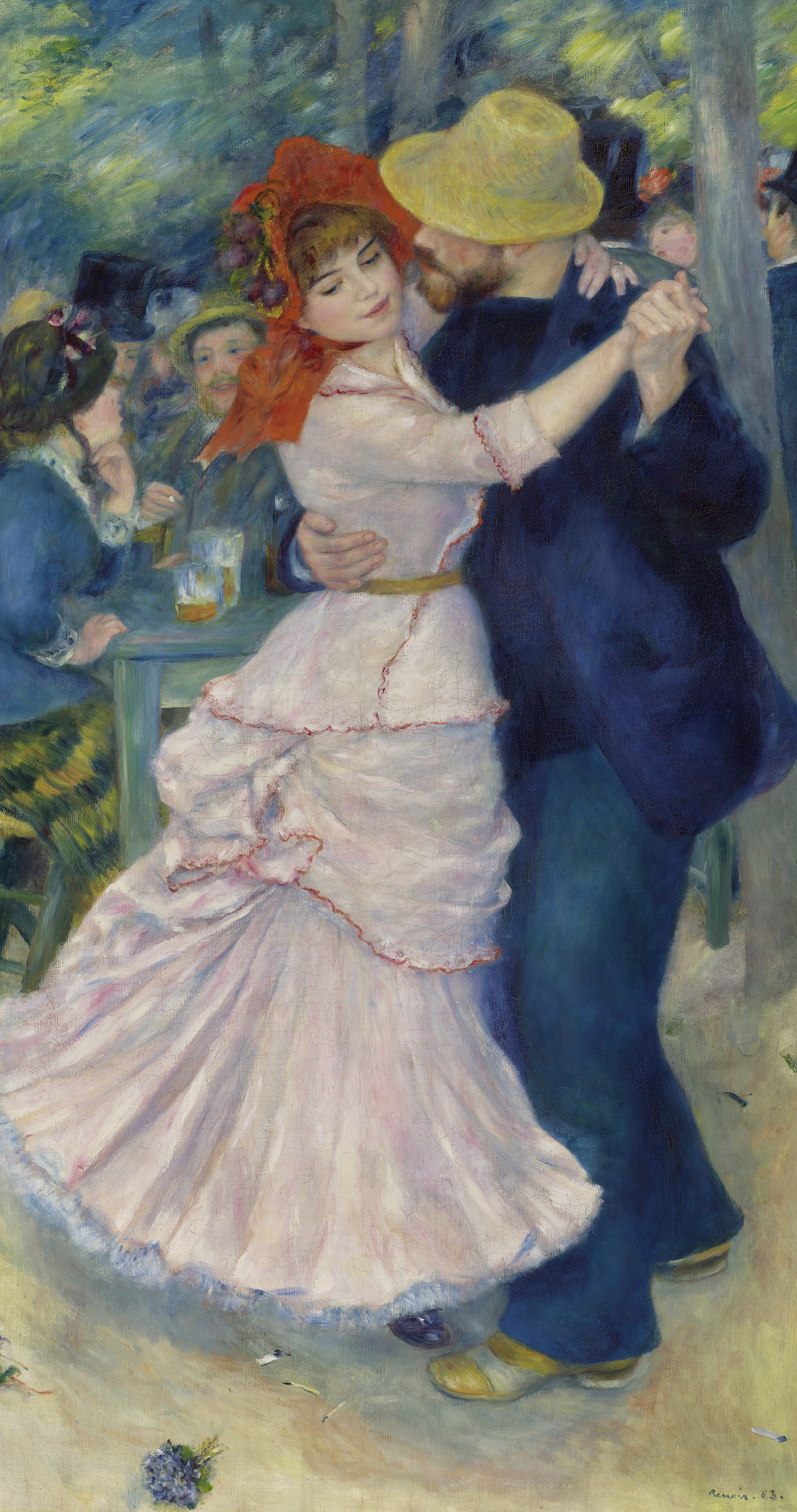
Dance at Bougival, painted by Pierre-Auguste Renoir in 1882–1883

== See also ==
- Communes of the Yvelines department
