= Bernard Forest de Bélidor =

French engineer (1698–1761)

Bernard Forest de Bélidor (1698, Catalonia, Spain – 8 September 1761, Paris, France) was a French engineer, significant to the development of the science of hydraulics and ballistics.

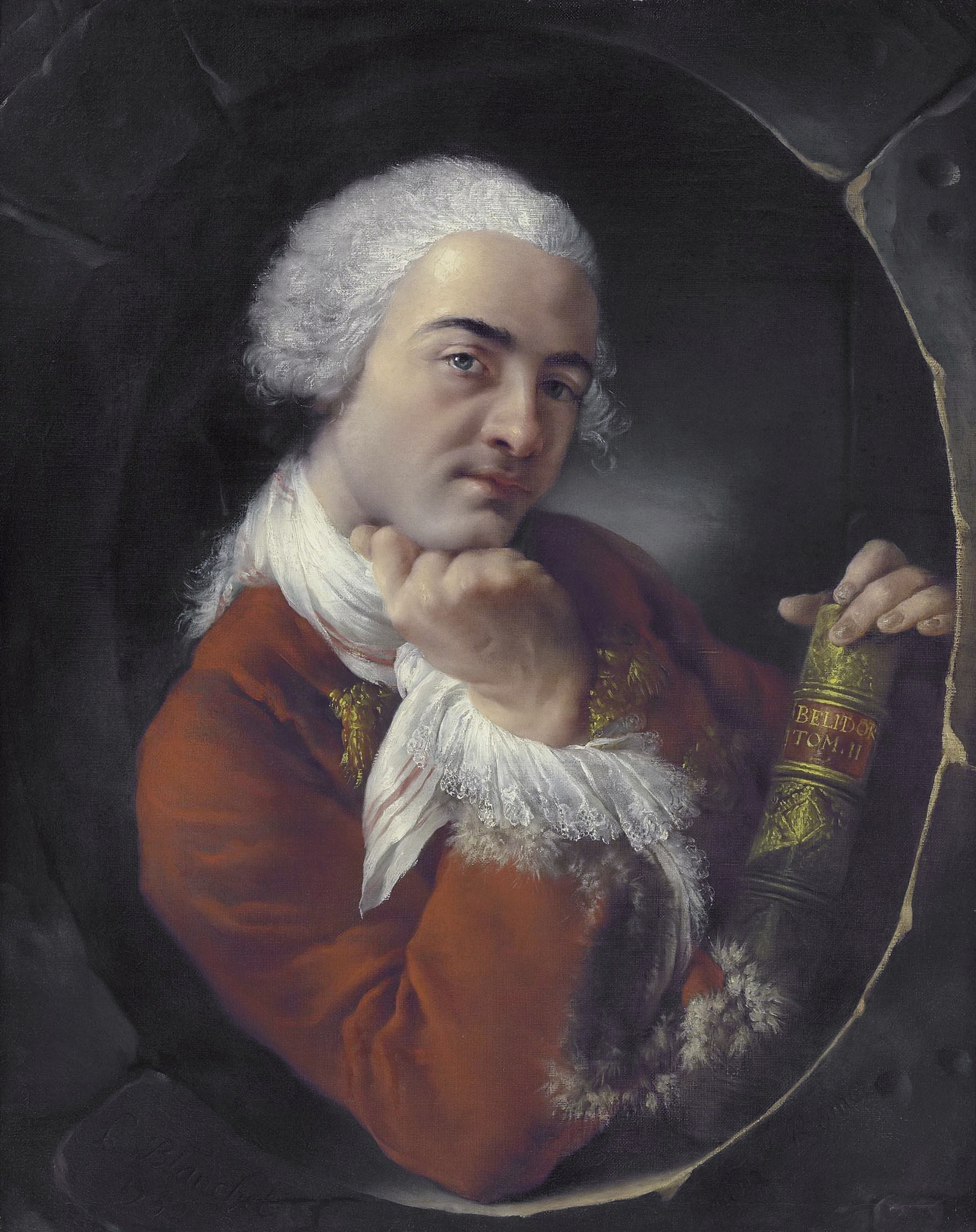
Portrait of B. Forest de Belidor (1698-1761) (Louis-Gabriel Blanchet, 1752)

He was the son of Jean Baptiste Foret de Belidor, an officer of dragoons, and his wife, Marie Héber but was orphaned at five months old and brought up by the family of his godfather, an artillery officer named de Fossiébourg. Bélidor enlisted in the army at a young age. After leaving the army, he developed an interest in science and engineering, and became professor at the school of artillery of La Fère in Aisne. For a while he worked on measuring the arc of the earth. In the years to come he published several works of great importance, on a wide range of subjects, including hydraulics, mathematics, and civil and military engineering. His most famous book is L'architecture hydraulique (published in four volumes from 1737 to 1753). Here, integral calculus is used for the first time in solving technical problems.

Bélidor was the teacher of Peter the Great's Ethiopian favourite, Abram Petrovich Gannibal. In November 1726, he was elected a Fellow of the Royal Society.

He married the daughter or granddaughter of de Fossiébourg.

== Works ==
- Nouveau cours de mathématiques, 1725 (first use of the term sinusoid)
- La science des ingénieurs dans la conduite des travaux de fortification et d'architecture civile, 1729
- Le bombardier français, ou, nouvelle méthode pour jeter des bombes avec précision. Tables, 1731
- L'architecture hydraulique, ou l'art de conduire, d'élever et de ménager les eaux pour les différents besoins de la vie, (1737-1753)
- Dictionnaire portatif de l'ingénieur, 1758
