= List of paintings by Claude Monet =

List of paintings created during

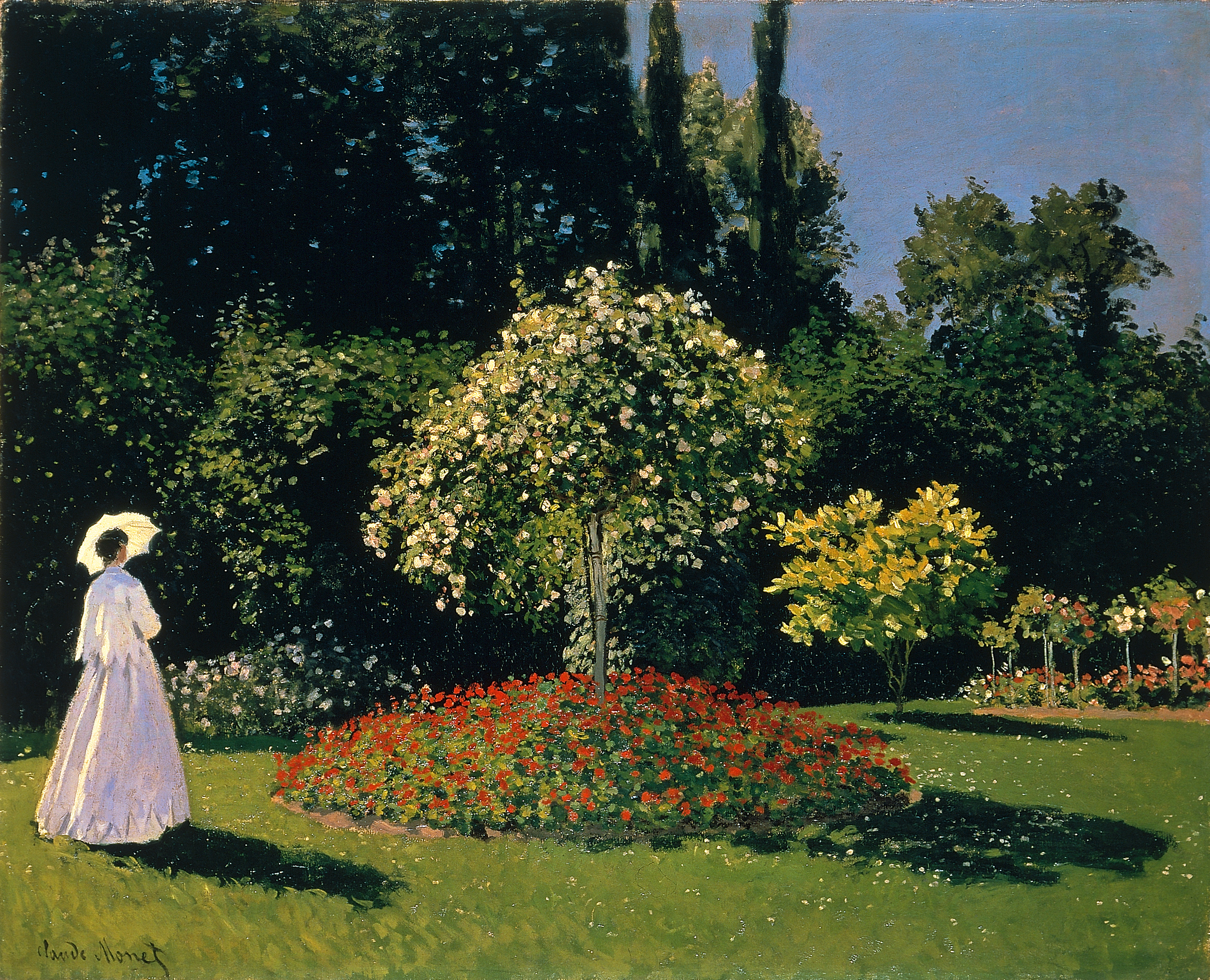
1858–1871

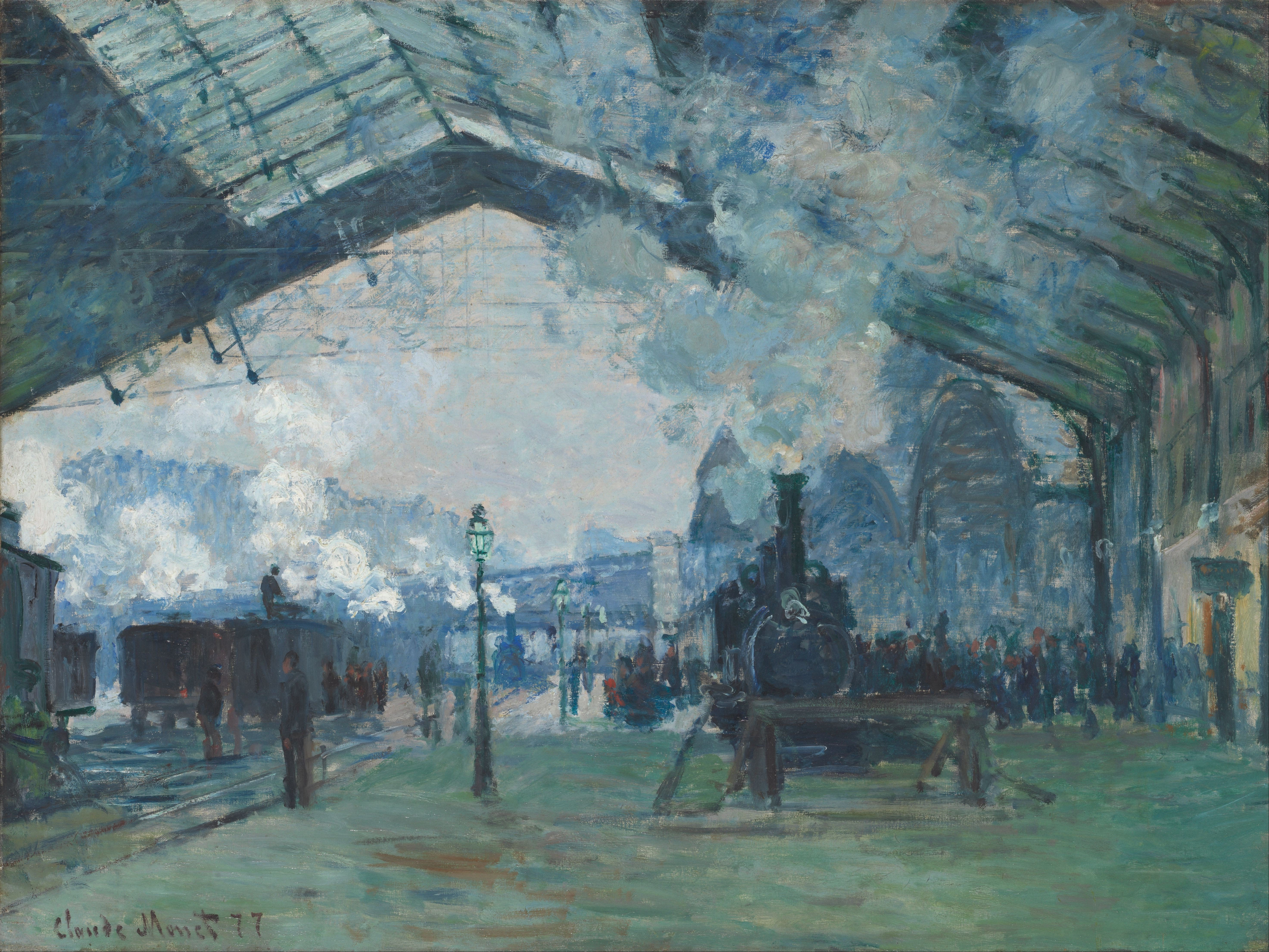
1872–1878

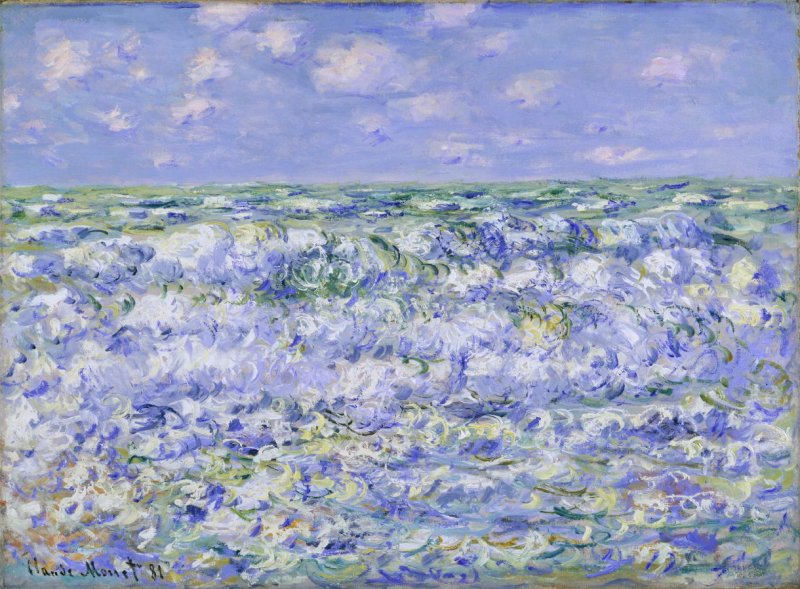
1878–1881

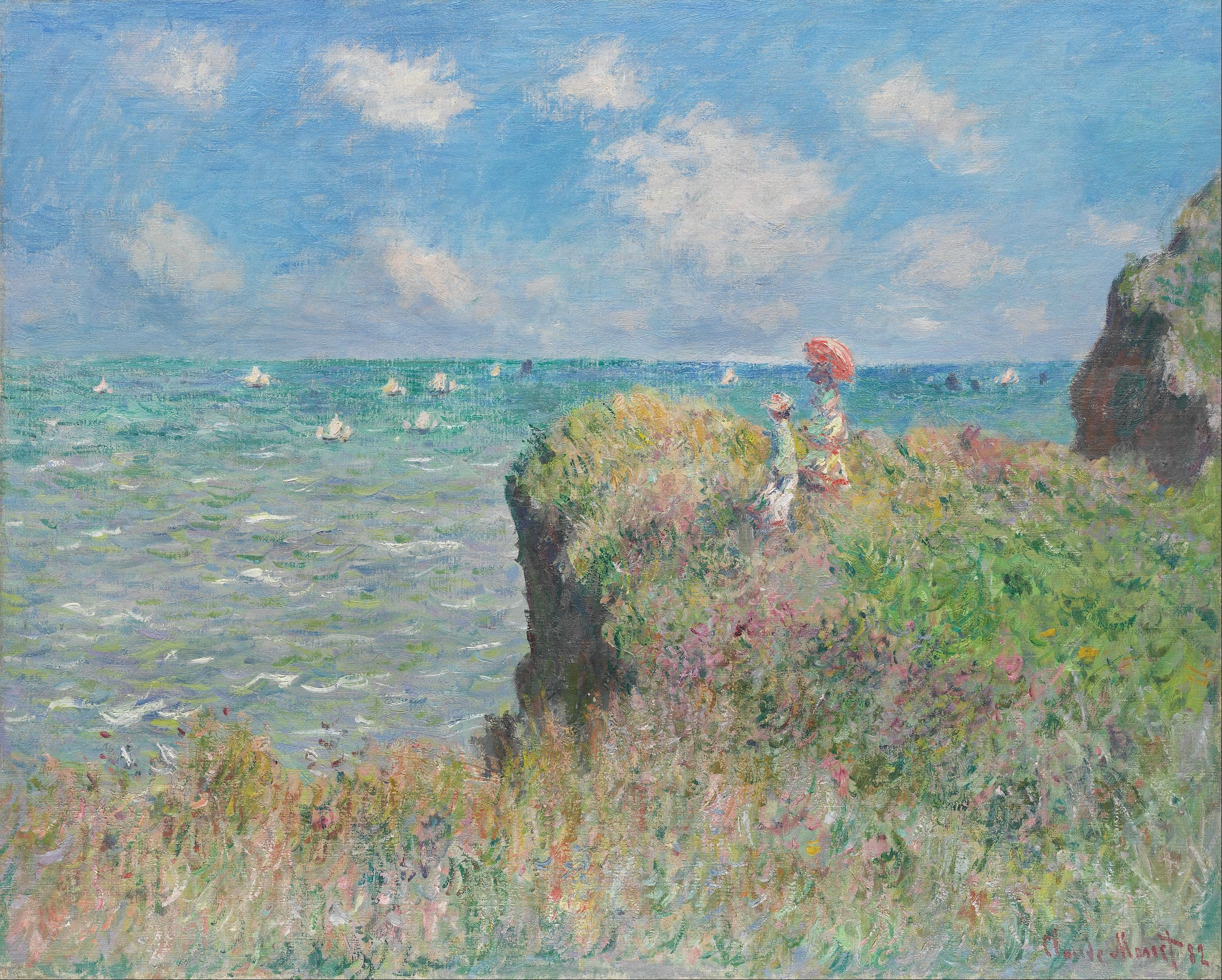
1881–1883

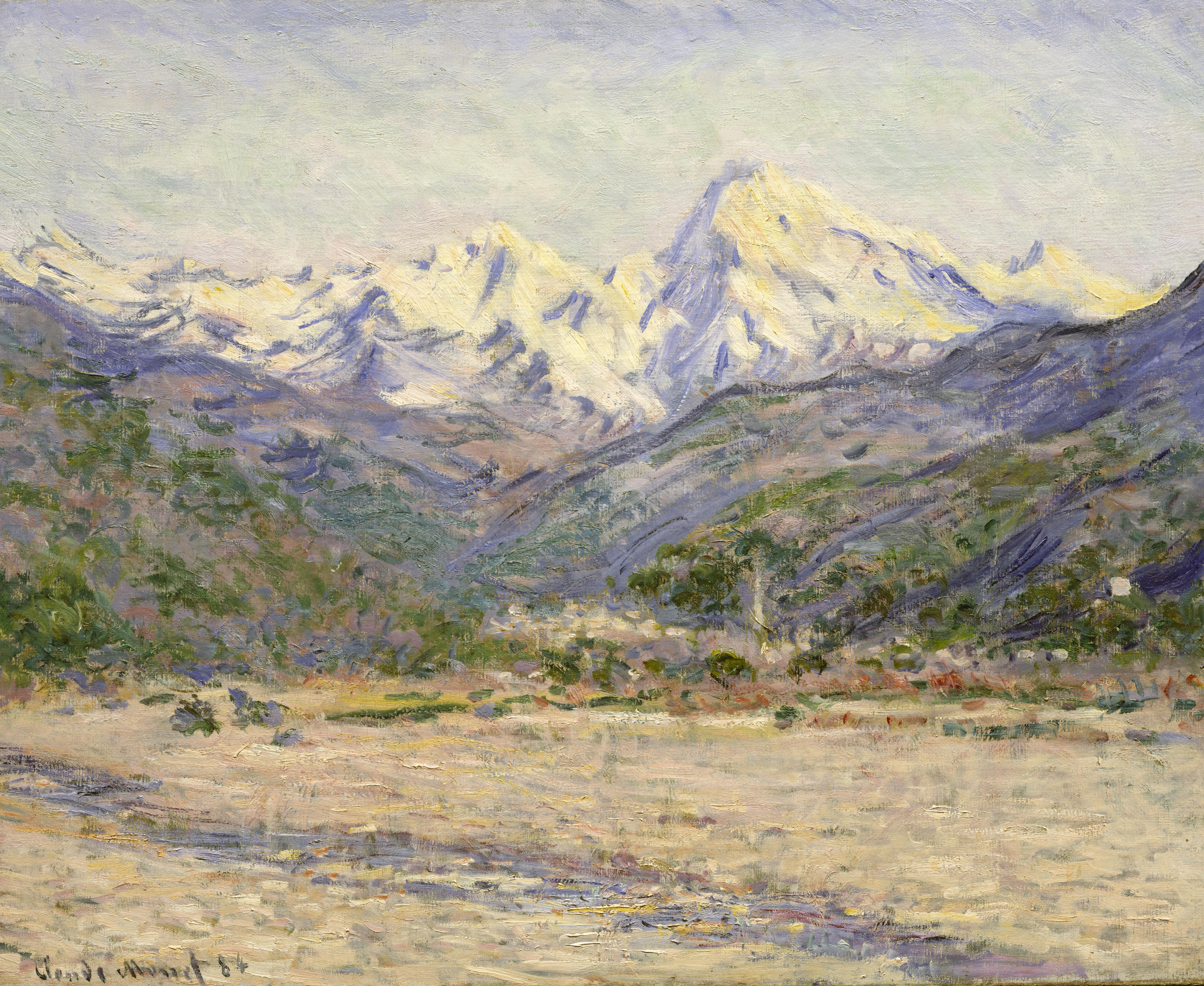
1884

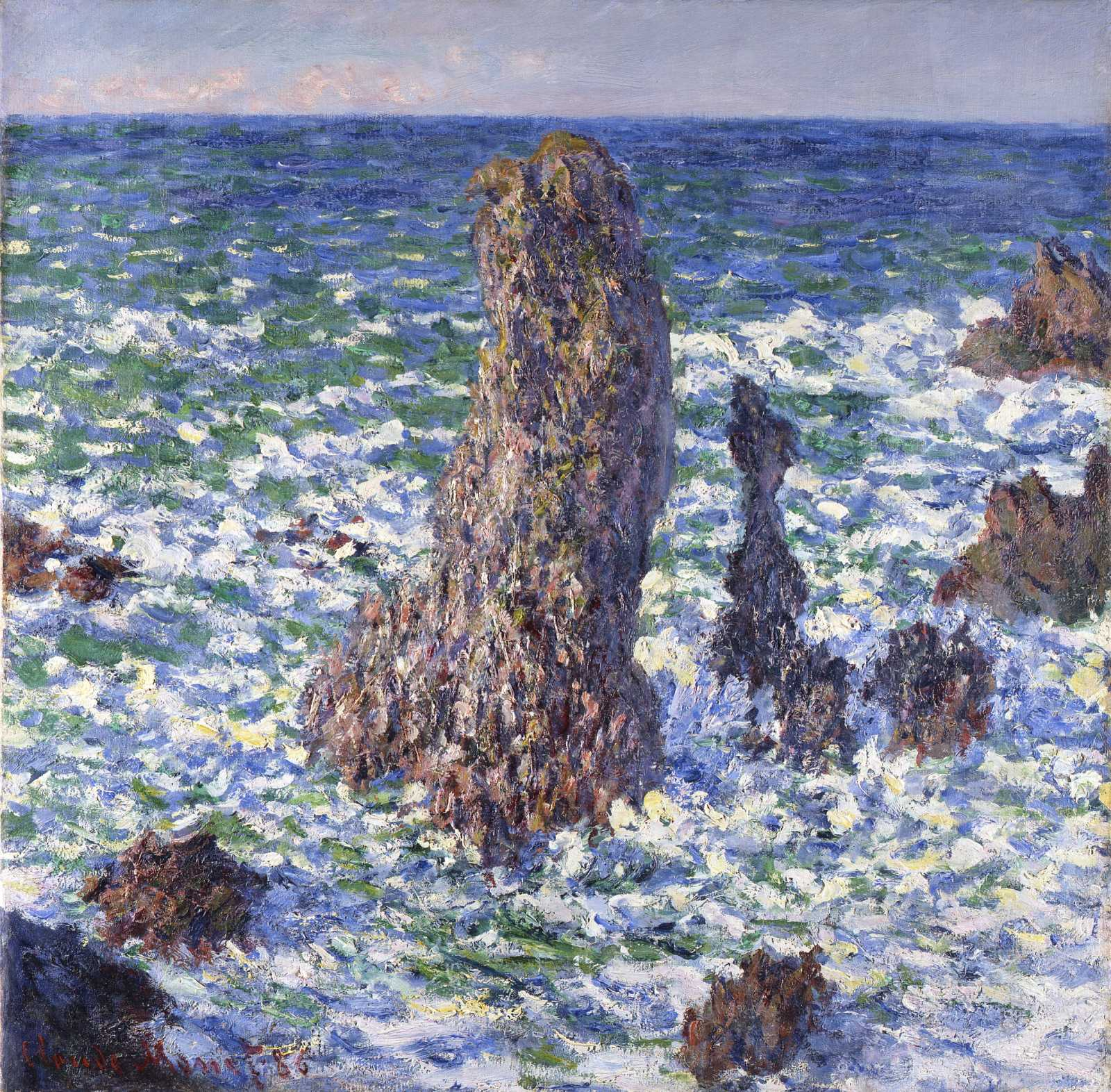
1884–1888

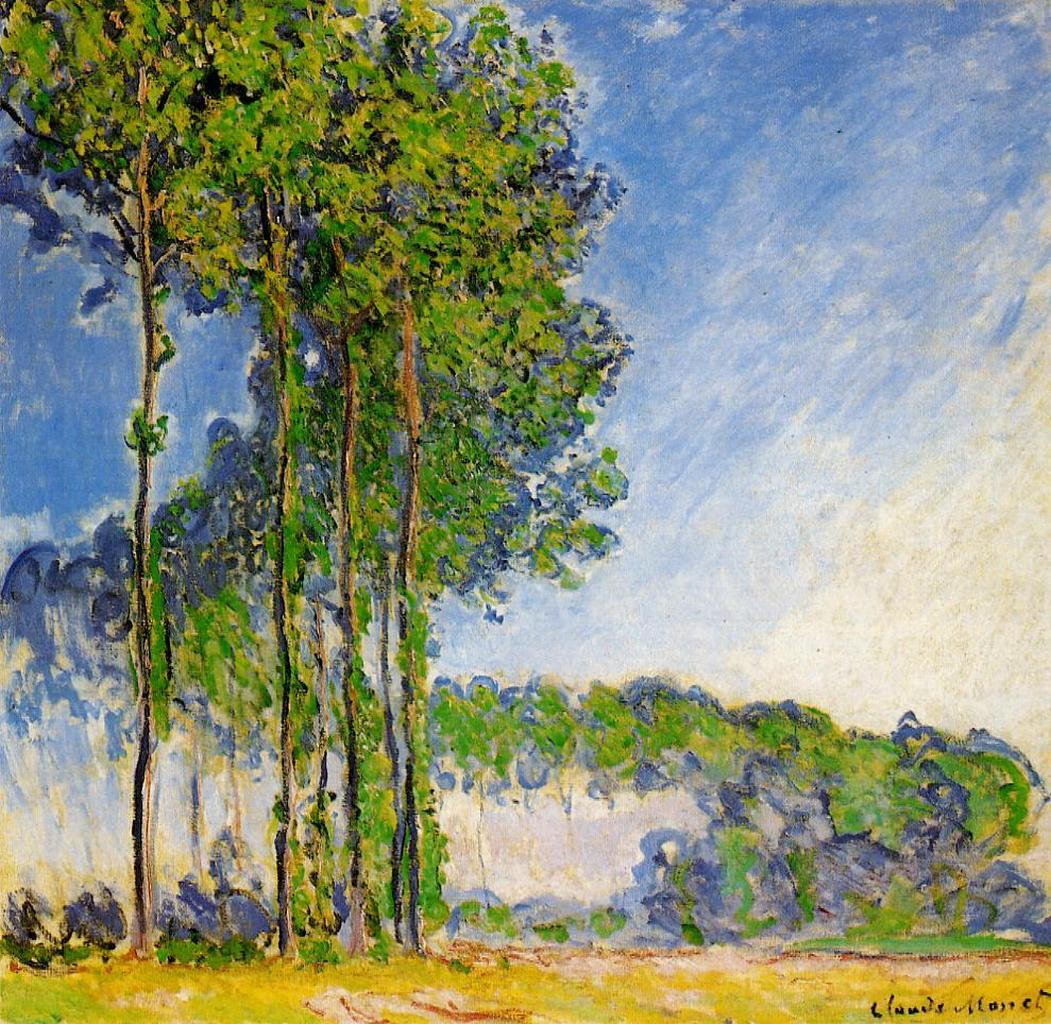
1888–1898

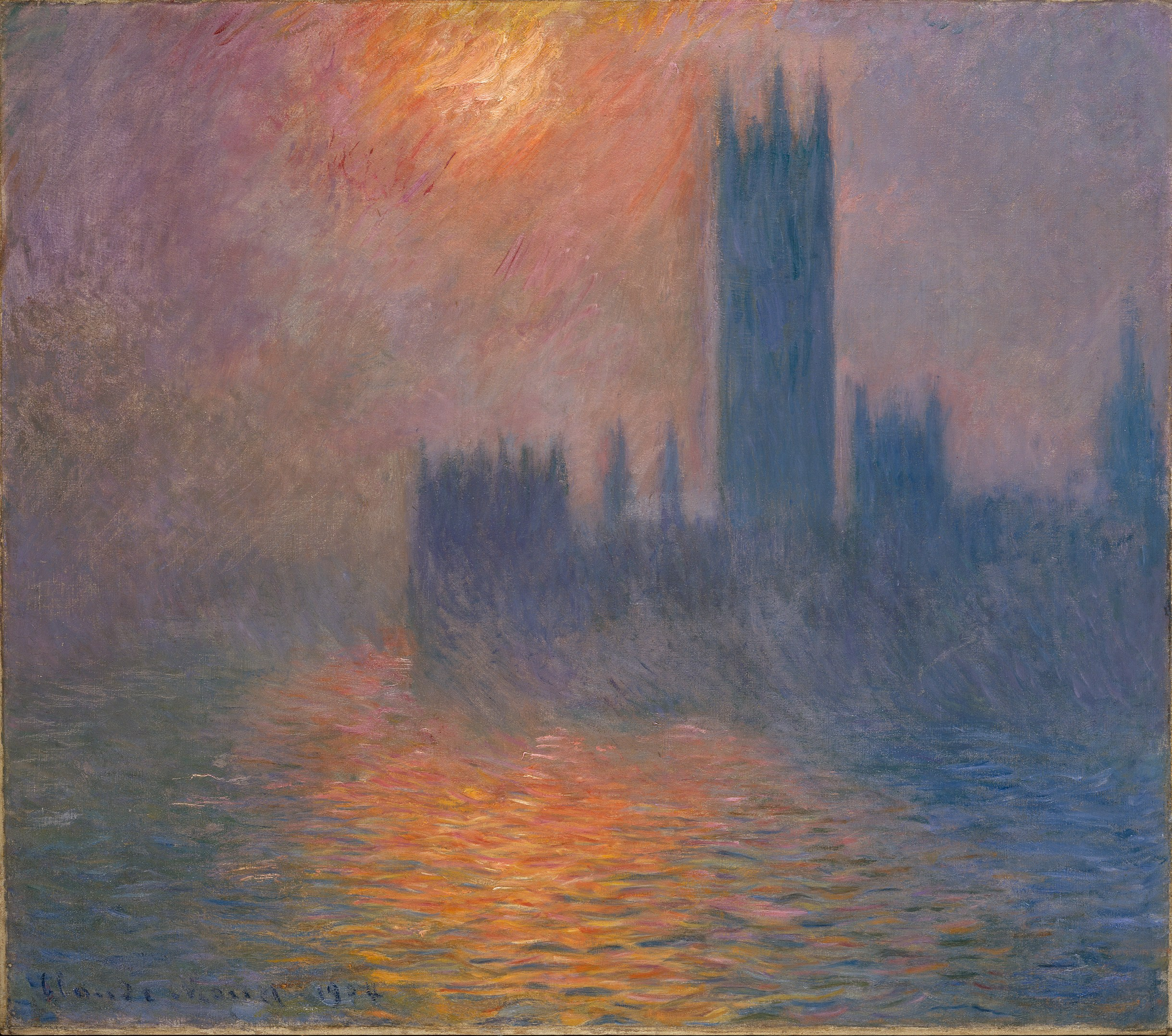
1899–1904

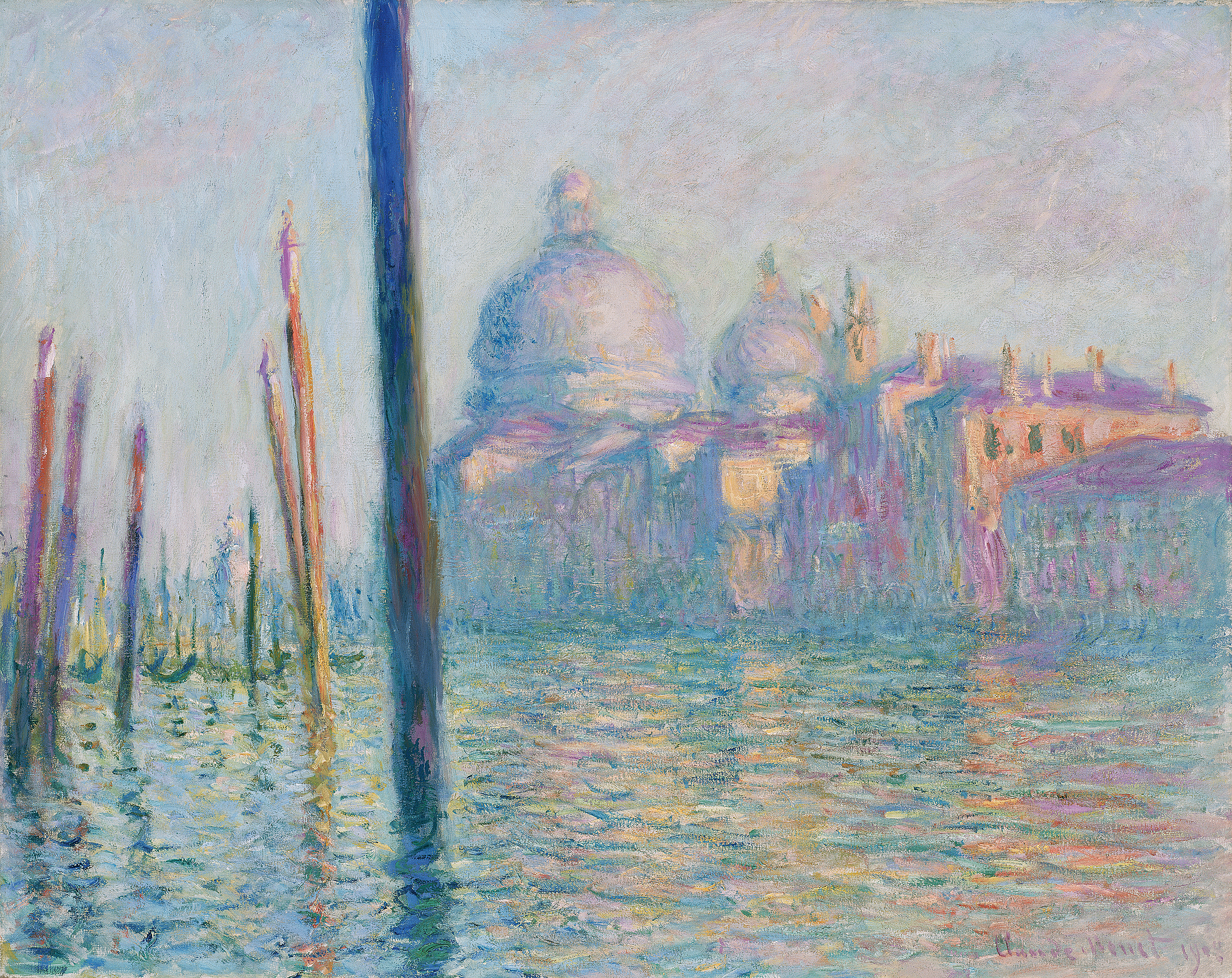
1900–1926

This is a list of works by Claude Monet (1840–1926), including all the extant finished paintings but excluding the Water Lilies, which can be found here, and preparatory black and white sketches.

Monet was a founder of French impressionist painting, and the most consistent and prolific practitioner of the movement's philosophy of expressing one's perceptions before nature, especially as applied to plein-air landscape painting. The term Impressionism is derived from the title of his painting Impression, Sunrise (Impression, soleil levant).

What made Monet different from the other Impressionist painters was his innovative idea of creating Series paintings devoted to paintings of a single theme or subject. With the repetitious study of the subject at different times of day Monet's paintings show the effects of sunlight, time and weather through color and contrast. Monet's "Series paintings" are well known and notable, and include Haystacks, Water Lilies, Rouen Cathedrals, Houses of Parliament, Charing Cross Bridge, and Poplar Trees. His prodigious output of nearly 2000 paintings was catalogued by Daniel Wildenstein.

== Timeline ==
- 1862–1871 Paris. Visits to Trouville (1870), London and Amsterdam (1871)
- 1870 Marriage to Camille Doncieux.
- 1871–1878 Family life in Argenteuil, near Paris. Visit to Amsterdam (1874)
- 1878 Living in Paris – Birth of Michel Monet
- 1878–1881 Living at Vétheuil, 60 km north-west of Paris. Visit to Fécamp.
- 1879 Death of Camille
- 1881–1883 Living at Poissy, 25 km north-west of Paris.
- 1883 Living at Vernon, Normandy
- 1883–1926 Living at his home and garden complex in Giverny, 80 km north west of Paris. Visits to Bordighera (1884), Holland (1886), Belle Île (1886), Antibes (1888), Creuse (1889), Rouen (1892, 1893, 1894), Norway (1895), London (1900), Venice (1908)
- 1892 Marriage to Alice Hoschedé
- 1926 Death

== Works 1858–1871 (Paris, London, Amsterdam) ==
- For Monet's Water Lilies works see Water Lilies (Monet series)
- All works listed are classified as Painting – oil on canvas except where described otherwise.

Image Title	Year	Location	Dimensions (cm.)	Cat. no. Medium
View at Rouelles, Le Havre	1858	Marunuma Art Park, Asaka	46 × 65	W.1
Still Life	1859	Unknown		W.2
Still Life	1859	Unknown		W.3
Still Life	1859	Unknown		W.4
Landscape with Factories	1858–61	Private collection	22 × 40	W.5; Oil on wood
Landscape with Factories	1858–61	Private collection	17 × 29	W.5a; Oil on wood
Corner of a Studio	1861	Musée d'Orsay, Paris	182 × 127	W.6
Still Life with Pheasant	1861	Musée d'Orsay, Paris	76 × 62.5	W.7
La Côtelette	1861	Private collection	33 × 45	W. 9
Hunting Trophy	1862	Musée d'Orsay, Paris	104 × 75	W.10
Still Life with Partridges	1862–63	Private collection	54.5 × 73	W.10a
Dog's Head	1862–63	Private collection	32 × 24.5	W.11
Greyhound's Head	1862–63	Private collection	24 × 28	W.12
Still Life with Bottle, Carafe, Bread and Wine	1862–63	National Gallery of Art, Washington D.C.	40.5 × 59.5	W.13
Still Life with Meat	1862–63	Musée d'Orsay, Paris	24 × 32	W.14
Head of a Woman	1862–63	Musée Marmottan Monet, Paris	52 × 41.5	W.15
Farmyard in Normandy	1863	Musée d'Orsay, Paris	65 × 80	W.16
Woodgatherers at the Edge of the Forest	1863	Museum of Fine Arts, Boston	61 × 91.5	W.18; Oil on wood
Road in a Forest	1864	Private collection	43 × 60	W.17
Le Pavé de Chailly	1864	Private collection	98 × 130	W.19
Spring Flowers	1864	Cleveland Museum of Art	116.5 × 91	W.20
Seashore at Sainte-Adresse	1864	Minneapolis Institute of Art	40 × 73	W.22
Étretat	1864	Association "Peindre en Normandie", Caen	27 × 41	W.22a
Étretat Porte d'Aval	1864	Private collection	28 × 49	W.22b
Coastal landscape	1864	Van Gogh Museum, Amsterdam	53 × 80	W.23
Road by Saint-Siméon Farm	1864	Unknown	59 × 80	W.24
Road by Saint-Simeon Farm	1864	Private collection	37 × 22	W.25; Oil on wood
	1864	Private collection	55 × 81	W.26
Boatyard near Honfleur	1864	Private collection	57 × 81	W. 27
Road by Saint-Siméon Farm	1864	Private collection	54 × 73	W.28
Road by Saint-Siméon Farm	1864	National Museum of Western Art, Tokyo	82 × 46	W.29
Road by Saint-Siméon Farm	1864	Private collection	91 × 48	W.30; Oil on wood
La Lieutenance at Honfleur	1864	Private collection	48.5 × 73	W.31
	1864	Private collection	53 × 73	W.32
Le Rue de la Bavole at Honfleur	1864	Museum of Fine Arts, Boston	56 × 61	W.33
Le Rue de la Bavole at Honfleur	1864	Kunsthalle Mannheim	58 × 63	W.34
The Chapel of Notre-dame de Grace at Honfleur	1864	Private collection	52 × 68	W.35
	1864	Private collection	38 × 46	W.36
Hauling a Boat Ashore, Honfleur	1864	Memorial Art Gallery, Rochester	55.5 × 82	W.37
Lighthouse at the Hospice	1864	Kunsthaus Zürich	54 × 81	W.38
La Pointe de la Hève, Honfleur	1864	National Gallery, London	41 × 73	W.39
	1864	Private collection	30 × 69	W.39a
Chevaux à la pointe de la Hève	1864	Private collection	51.5 × 73	W.40
The Beach at Honfleur	1864–66	Los Angeles County Museum of Art	60 × 81	W.41
Portrait of a Man Standing	1864	Private collection	45.5 × 32	W.42
Dr. Leclenché	1864	Metropolitan Museum of Art, New York	46 × 32.5	W.43
Man with a Pipe	1864	Private collection	45 × 34	W.44
A Cart on the Snowy Road at Honfleur	1865 or 1867	Musée d'Orsay, Paris	65 × 92	W.50
Mouth of the Seine at Honfleur	1865	Norton Simon Museum, Pasadena	90 × 150	W.51
The Pointe de la Heve at Low Tide	1865	Kimbell Art Museum, Fort Worth	90 × 150	W.52
Portrait of a Man: Adolphe Monet	1865	Zimmerli Art Museum, New Brunswick	53 × 45	W.53
Adolphe Monet, Father of the Artist	1865	Private collection	46 × 38	W.53a
Victor Jacquemont Holding a Parasol	1865	Kunsthaus Zürich	105 × 61.5	W.54
	1865	Private collection	54 × 80	W.55
Haystacks at Chailly at Sunrise	1865	San Diego Museum of Art	30 × 60	W.55a
Le Pavé de Chailly	1865	Musée d'Orsay, Paris	42 × 59	W.56
Le Pavé de Chailly in the Fontainebleau Forest	1865	Ordrupgaard, Copenhagen	97 × 130	W.57
Path in the Forest	1865	Sammlung Rau fuer UNICEF, Arp Museum Bahnhof Rolandseck, Remagen	79 × 58	W.58
Fontainebleau Forest	1865	Kunstmuseum Winterthur	50 × 65	W.59
The Bodmer Oak, Fontainebleau	1865	Metropolitan Museum of Art, New York	97 × 130	W.60
The Bodmer Oak	1865	Private collection	54 × 40	W.60a
The Strollers (study for Luncheon on the Grass)	1865	National Gallery of Art, Washington D.C.	93.5 × 69.5	W.61
Luncheon on the Grass (study)	1865	Pushkin Museum, Moscow	130 × 181	W.62
Le Déjeuner sur l’herbe - left panel	1865–66	Musée d'Orsay, Paris	418 × 150	W.63/1
Le Déjeuner sur l’herbe - right panel	1865–66	Musée d'Orsay, Paris	248 × 217	W.63/2
Camille with a Small Dog	1866	Private collection	73 × 54	W.64
Camille (also known as The Woman in a Green Dress)	1866	Kunsthalle Bremen	231 × 151	W.65
Camille (Replica)	1866	National Museum of Art of Romania, Bucharest	81 × 55	W.66; Oil on wood
Women in the Garden	1866	Musée d'Orsay, Paris	256 × 208	W.67
Woman in the Garden	1867	Hermitage Museum, St Petersburg	80 × 99	W.68
Adolphe Monet in the Garden of Le Coteau at Sainte-Adresse	1867	Private collection	81 × 99	W.68a
Garden in Flower	1866	Musée d'Orsay, Paris	65 × 54	W.69
Jar of Peaches	1866	Staatliche Kunstsammlungen Dresden	55.5 × 46	W.70
Seascape, Night Effect	1866	Scottish National Gallery, Edinburgh	59.5 × 72.5	W.71
Seascape	1866	Ordrupgaard, Copenhagen	42 × 59.5	W.72
The Green Wave	1866	Metropolitan Museum of Art, New York	49 × 65	W.73
Bateaux de pêche, Honfleur	1867	National Museum of Art of Romania, Bucharest	38 × 46	W.74
Sailing Boats at Honfleur	1866	Private collection	55 × 46	W.75
Fishing Boats (study)	1866	Private collection	45 × 55	W.76
Port of Honfleur	1867	Destroyed during World War II	148 × 226	W.77
Boats in the Port of Honfleur	1866	Private collection	49 × 65	W.77a
The Road in Front of Saint-Simeon Farm in Winter	1867	Musée d'Orsay, Paris	81 × 100	W.79
Road to the Farm of Saint-Simeon	1867	Fogg Museum, Cambridge	56 × 81	W.80
The Road to the Farm of Saint-Simeon in Winter	1867	Private collection	49 × 65	W.81
The Snowy Road at Honfleur	1867	Private collection	75 × 100	W.82
Quai du Louvre	1867	Kunstmuseum Den Haag	65 × 92	W.83
Saint-Germain-l'Auxerrois	1867	Alte Nationalgalerie, Berlin	79 × 98	W.84
Garden of the Princess	1867	Allen Memorial Art Museum, Oberlin	91 × 62	W.85
Stormy Seascape	1867	Clark Art Institute, Williamstown	49 × 64	W.86
L'Entrée du port de Le Havre	1867	Norton Simon Museum, Pasadena	50 × 61	W.87
In the Port of Honfleur	1867	Unknown	6.5 × 9	W.87a
The Jetty of Le Havre in Rough Weather	1867	Private collection	50 × 61	W.88
The Beach at Sainte-Adresse	1867	Private collection	59 × 80	W.90
Regatta at Sainte-Adresse	1867	Metropolitan Museum of Art, New York	75.5 × 101.5	W.91
The Beach at Sainte-Adresse	1867	Art Institute of Chicago	75 × 101	W.92
Sainte-Adresse, Fishing Boats on the Shore	1867	National Gallery of Art, Washington D.C.	57 × 80	W.93
Taking a Walk on the Cliffs of Sainte-Adresse	1867	Matsuoka Museum of Art, Tokyo	54 × 79	W.93a
The Cabin at Sainte-Adresse	1867	Musée d'Art et d'Histoire (Geneva)	52 × 62	W.94
Garden at Sainte-Adresse	1867	Metropolitan Museum of Art, New York	98 × 130	W.95
Street in Sainte-Adresse	1867	Clark Art Institute, Williamstown	80 × 59.5	W.98
Portrait of a Man	1867	Private collection	35 × 26.5	W.99
Portrait of Ernest Cabade	1867	Private collection	61 × 46	W.100
Jean Monet in His Cradle	1867	National Gallery of Art, Washington D.C.	116 × 89	W.101
Still Life with Birds and Fruit	1867	Private collection	50 × 61	W.102
	1867	Private collection	46 × 56	W.103
Pears and Grapes	1867–68	Private collection	64.5 × 80	W.104
Ice Floes on the Seine at Bougival	1867–68	Musée du Louvre, Paris	65 × 81	W.105
Snow on the River	1867–68	Private collection	59.5 × 73.5	W.106
Jean Monet Sleeping	1868	Ny Carlsberg Glyptotek, Copenhagen	42 × 50	W.108
The Jetty at Le Havre	1868	Private collection	147 × 226	W.109
River Scene at Bennecourt	1868	Art Institute of Chicago	81 × 100	W.110
The Sea at Sainte-Adresse	1868	Carnegie Museum of Art, Pittsburgh	60 × 80	W.112
Seaside at Sainte-Adresse	1868	Private collection	46 × 65	W.113
The Huts at Sainte-Adresse	1868	Private collection	43 × 65	W.114
The Seine Near its Estuary, Honfleur	1868	Rhode Island School of Design Museum, Providence	48 × 73	W.115
Fishing Boats at Honfleur	1868	Calouste Gulbenkian Museum, Lisbon	100 × 80	W.116
Boat Lying at Low Tide at Fécamp	1868	Private collection	74 × 54	W.117
Stranded Boat in Fécamp	1868	Kunstmuseum Winterthur	61 × 46.5	W.118
Boats at Fécamp	1868	Private collection	75 × 57	W.119
Madame Gaudibert	1868	Musée d'Orsay, Paris	216 × 138	W.121
Portrait of Young Louis Gaudibert	1868	Private collection	46 × 38	W.123
Fishing Boats, Calm Sea	1868	Private collection	65 × 54	W.124
Voiliers en mer	1868	Cantonal Museum of Fine Arts	45 × 61	W.125
Fishing Boats at Sea	1868–69	Hill-Stead Museum, Farmington	96 × 130	W.126
Rough Sea at Etretat	1868–69	Musée d'Orsay, Paris	66 × 131	W.127
Lane in Normandy	1868	Matsuoka Museum of Art, Tokyo	81 × 60	W.128
The Dinner	1868–69	Foundation E.G. Bührle, Zürich	52 × 65	W.129
Interior, after Dinner	1868–69	National Gallery of Art, Washington D.C.	50 × 65	W.130
L'Enfant a la tasse	1868	Private collection	46 × 33	W.131
The Luncheon	1868	Städel Museum, Frankfurt	230 × 150	W.132
The Magpie	1868–69	Musée d'Orsay, Paris	89 × 130	W.133
La Grenouillere	1869	Metropolitan Museum of Art, New York	75 × 100	W.134
Bathers at La Grenouillere	1869	National Gallery, London	73 × 92	W.135
La Grenouillere	1869	Destroyed during World War II	Unknown	W.136
Rowing Boats	1869	Kunsthalle Bremen	33 × 46	W.137
The Landing Stage	1869	Private collection	54 × 74	W.138
People in a Rowing Boat	1869	Private collection	18 × 22	W.138a
Flowers and Fruit	1869	J. Paul Getty Museum, Los Angeles	100 × 80	W.139
Red Mullets	1869	Fogg Museum, Cambridge	35.5 × 50	W.140
Pheasant	1869	Private collection	41 × 79	W.141
Portrait of Jean Monet Wearing a Hat with a Pompom	1869	Fondation Bemberg, Toulouse	41 × 34	W.142
The Seine at Bougival	1869	Private collection	51 × 65	W.143
Path through the Forest, Snow Effect	1870	Private collection	58 × 63	W.144
Snow at Sunset	1869	Musée des Beaux-Arts de Rouen	43 × 65	W.145
Boar's Head	1869	Gezira Museum, Museum of Modern Egyptian Art, Cairo	54 × 65	W.146
Road to Louveciennes, Snow Effect	1869	Private collection	55 × 65	W.147
Road at Louveciennes, Melting Snow, Sunset	1869	Private collection	40 × 54	W.148
Infantry Guards Wandering along the River	1870	Private collection	54 × 65	W.149
The Seine at Bougival	1870	Private collection	40 × 73	W.150
The Seine at Bougival, Evening (also known as Bougival)	1870	Smith College Museum of Art, Northampton	60 × 73.5	W.151
The Bridge at Bougival	1869	Currier Museum of Art, Manchester	63.5 × 91.5	W.152
Train in the Countryside	1870	Musée d'Orsay, Paris	50 × 65	W.153
Entrance to the Port of Trouville	1870	Museum of Fine Arts, Budapest	54 × 66	W.154
Hotel des Roches Noires, Trouville	1870	Musée d'Orsay, Paris	80 × 55	W.155
The Beach at Trouville	1870	Wadsworth Atheneum, Hartford	53.5 × 65	W.156
The Boardwalk at Trouville	1870	Private collection	48 × 74	W.157
The Boardwalk on the Beach at Trouville	1870	Private collection	50 × 70	W.157a
The Beach at Trouville	1870	National Gallery, London	38 × 46	W.158
Camille Sitting on the Beach at Trouville	1870–71	Private collection	45 × 36	W.159
Camille on the Beach	1870–71	Yale University Art Gallery, New Haven	38 × 47	W.160
Camille on the Beach at Trouville	1870	Musée Marmottan Monet, Paris	30 × 15	W.161
On the Beach at Trouville	1870–71	Musée Marmottan Monet, Paris	38 × 46	W.162
Meditation, Madame Monet Sitting on a Sofa	1870–71	Musée d'Orsay, Paris	48 × 75	W.163
Hyde Park	1871	Rhode Island School of Design Museum, Providence	41 × 74	W.164
Green Park in London	1871	Philadelphia Museum of Art	34 × 72	W.165
The Thames below Westminster	1871	National Gallery, London	47 × 73	W.166
The Thames below Westminster	1871	Private collection	50 x70	w.166a
Boats in the Pool of London	1871	Private collection	47 × 72	W.167
The Pool of London	1871	National Museum Cardiff	49 × 74	W.168
Vue d'un port	1871	Private collection	48.5 × 63.5	W.169
Windmills near Zaandam	1871	Walters Art Museum, Baltimore	40 × 72	W.170
A Windmill at Zaandam	1871	Ny Carlsberg Glyptotek, Copenhagen	48.5 × 73.5	W.171
The Zaan at Zaandam	1871	Private collection	42 × 73	W.172
Boats on the Zaan	1871	Glynn Vivian Art Gallery, Swansea	35 × 71	W.173
The Banks of the Zaan	1871	Private collection	33 × 70	W.174
The Voorzaan	1871	Zaans Museum, Zaandam	39 × 71	W.175
View of the Voorzaan	1871	Musée Marmottan Monet, Paris	18 × 38	W.176
Windmill and Boats near Zaandam	1871	Ny Carlsberg Glyptotek, Copenhagen	48 × 73.5	W.177
A Windmill near Zaandam	1871	Ashmolean Museum, Oxford	43 × 73	W.178
View from the Voorzaan	1871	Nationalmuseum, Stockholm	34 × 74	W.179
Windmills in Holland	1871	Private collection	46 × 71	W.180
Windmills near Zaandam	1871	Van Gogh Museum, Amsterdam	47 × 73	W.181
Windmills at Zaandam	1871	Private collection	48 × 73	W.182
Zaandam	1871	Musée d'Orsay, Paris	47 × 73	W.183
The Blue House at Zaandam	1871	Private collection	45 × 60.5	W.184
Houses on the Zaan River at Zaandam	1871	Städel Museum, Frankfurt	47.5 × 73.5	W.185
Houses on the Achterzaan	1871	Metropolitan Museum of Art, New York	48 × 73	W.186
The Zaan at Zaandam	1871	Private collection	47 × 73	W.187
The Port of Zaandam	1871	Private collection	47 × 74	W.188
Boats at Zaandam	1871	Museum Barberini, Potsdam	45 × 72	W.189
The Dam at Zaandam, evening	1871	Private collection	44.5 × 72.5	W.190
Canal in Zaandam	1871	High Museum of Art, Atlanta	44 × 72.5	W.191
Passerelle à Zaandam	1871	Musée des Ursulines, Macon	46 × 38	W.191a
Guurtje Van de Stadt	1871	Kröller-Müller Museum, Otterlo	73 × 40	W.192

== Works 1872–1878 (Argenteuil) ==
Image Title	Year	Location	Dimensions (cm.)	Cat. no. Medium
The Pont Neuf	1872	Dallas Museum of Art	53.5 × 73.5	W.193
Argenteuil, the Bridge under Repair	1872	Fitzwilliam Museum, Cambridge	60 × 80.5	W.194
The Wooden Bridge	1872	Private collection	54 × 73	W.195
Small Arm of the Seine at Argenteuil	1872	National Gallery, London	53 × 73	W.196
Argenteuil, seen from the Small Arm of the Seine	1872	Private collection	50 × 65	W.197
The Seine in Argenteuil	1873	Private collection	50 × 61	W.198
Springtime at Argenteuil	1872	Portland Museum of Art	51 × 62	W.199
Small Boat on the Small Branch of the Seine at Argenteuil	1872	Private collection	51 × 63.5	W.200
Trees in Bloom	1872	Private collection	57.5 × 69.5	W.201
The Garden	1872	Private collection	64 × 81	W.202
Lilacs, Grey Weather	1872	Musée d'Orsay, Paris	48 × 64	W.203
Lilac in the Sun	1872	Pushkin Museum, Moscow	50 × 65	W.204
Springtime	1872	Walters Art Museum, Baltimore	50 × 65	W.205
The Robec Stream, Rouen	1872	Musée d'Orsay, Paris	60 × 65	W.206
Anchored Chasse-marée	1872	Musée d'Orsay, Paris	48 × 75	W.207
The Seine downstream from Rouen	1872	Private collection	40 × 58	W.208
	1872	Private collection	47 × 56	W.209
Ships Riding on the Seine at Rouen	1872	National Gallery of Art, Washington D.C.	38 × 46	W.210
The Seine at Rouen	1872	Hermitage Museum, St Petersburg	54 × 65	W.211
Boats at Rouen	1872	Private collection	50 × 65	W.212
The Goods Train	1872	Pola Museum of Art, Hakone	48 × 76	W.213
	1872	Private collection	56 × 74	W.216
View of Rouen	1872	Private collection	54 × 73	W.217
The Seine at Rouen	1872	Shizuoka Prefectural Museum of Art, Shizuoka	49.5 × 77.5	W.218
Lane in the Vineyards at Argenteuil	1872	Private collection	47 × 74	W.219
View to the plain of Argenteuil	1872	Musée d'Orsay, Paris	53 × 72	W.220
	1872	Private collection	53 × 71	W.221
The Promenade at Argenteuil	1872	Private collection	53 × 73	W.222
Argenteuil	1872	National Gallery of Art, Washington D.C.	50.5 × 65	W.223
Argenteuil, Late Afternoon	1872	Private collection	60 × 81	W.224
The Basin at Argenteuil	1872	Musée d'Orsay, Paris	60 × 80.5	W.225
Argenteuil, Boats along the Bank	1872	Mohamed Mahmoud Khalil Museum, Cairo	46 × 72	W.226
Boats on the Seine at Le Petit-Gennevilliers	1872	Legion of Honor, San Francisco	54 × 65	W.227
The Seine at Le Petit-Gennevilliers	1872	Private collection	47.5 × 63	W.228
Pleasure Boats	1872	Musée d'Orsay, Paris	47 × 65	W.229
Argenteuil	1872	Musée d'Orsay, Paris	49 × 65	W.230
Argenteuil Seen from the Small Arm of the Seine	1872	Private collection	54.5 × 72.5	W.231
The Small Arm of the Seine at Argenteuil	1872	Pola Museum of Art, Hakone	51 × 65.5	W.232
Regatta at Argenteuil	1872	Musée d'Orsay, Paris	48 × 75	W.233
Voilier	1872	Private collection	41.5 × 71.5	W.234
View of Argenteuil	1872	Private collection	42 × 83	W. 235
The Seine near Bougival	1872	Private collection	48 × 95	W.236
Carrières-Saint-Denis	1872	Musée d'Orsay, Paris	61 × 81	W.237
Jean Monet on His Horse Tricycle	1872	Metropolitan Museum of Art, New York	59.5 × 73.5	W.238
The Old Rue de la Chaussee, Argenteuil	1872	Private collection	55 × 73	W.239
	1872	Private collection	49.5 × 63.5	W.240
Fete at Argenteuil	1872	Private collection	60 × 81	W.241
The Railroad Station at Argenteuil	1872	Musée Tavet-Delacour, Pontoise	47.5 × 71	W.242
Village Street	1872	Dixon Gallery and Gardens, Memphis	43.5 × 65	W.243
The Tea Set	1872	Dallas Museum of Art, Dallas	53 × 72	W.244
Still Life with Melon	1872	Calouste Gulbenkian Museum, Lisbon	53 × 73	W.245
Partridge and Woodcock	1872	Private collection	61 × 51	W.246
Boulevard Héloise, Argenteuil	1872	Yale University Art Gallery, New Haven	35 × 59	W.247
The House on the Mall	1872	Private collection	58.5 × 71	W.248
Fog Effect	1872	Private collection	48 × 76	W.249
Fog Effect	1872	Private collection	50 × 65	W.250
Flood in Argenteuil	1872	Artizon Museum, Tokyo	54 × 73	W.251
The Flood	1872	Private collection	80 × 58.5	W.252
The Seine at Argenteuil	1872	Private collection	28 × 58	W.253
The Mill at Orgemont, Snow	1873	Virginia Museum of Fine Arts, Richmond	58.5 × 81	W.254
Thaw in Argenteuil	1873	Private collection	55 × 73	W.255
The Plain of Colombes, White Frost	1873	The Niigata Prefectural Museum Of Modern Art	55 × 73	W.256
The Red Kerchief, Portrait of Madame Monet	1873	Cleveland Museum of Art	100 × 80	W.257
The Porte d'Amont, Etretat	1873	Fogg Museum, Cambridge	81 × 100	W.258
Study of Boats (also known as Ships in Harbor)	1873	Museum of Fine Arts, Boston	50 × 60	W.259
Boats under Repair	1873	National Galleries of Scotland, Edinburgh	71 × 53.5	W.260
Le Havre Museum	1873	National Gallery, London	75 × 100	W.261
Sunrise (also known as Seascape)	1873	Getty Center, Los Angeles	49 × 60	W.262
Impression, Sunrise	1873	Musée Marmottan Monet, Paris	48 × 63	W.263
The Port of Le Havre, Night Effect	1873	Private collection	60 × 81	W.264
Sailing at Sainte-Adresse	1873	Private collection	48 × 74	W.265
The Cliff at Sainte-Adresse	1873	Private collection	54 × 71	W.266
Boats at Rouen	1873	Private collection	61 × 80	W.267
The Seine at Rouen	1873	Staatliche Kunsthalle, Karlsruhe	50.5 × 65.5	W.268
	1873	Private collection	55 × 74	W.269
The Seine at Asnieres	1873	Hermitage Museum, St Petersburg	46.4 х 55.5	W.269a
The Seine at Asnieres	1873	Private collection	55 × 74	W.270
Springtime	1873	Metropolitan Museum of Art, New York	60 × 100	W.271
Apple Trees in Bloom	1873	Private collection	61 × 100	W.272
Springtime	1873	Johannesburg Art Gallery	58 × 78.5	W.273
Les Coquelicots	1873	Musée d'Orsay, Paris	50 × 65	W.274
In the Meadow near Argenteuil	1873	Private collection		W.275
Walk in the Meadows at Argenteuil	1873	Rhode Island School of Design Museum, Providence	54.5 × 65	W.276
Houses at Argenteuil	1873	Berlin State Museums	54 × 73	W.277
The Bridge at Argenteuil	1873	Private collection	45.5 × 71	W.278
The Railroad Bridge at Argenteuil	1873	Private collection	60 × 99	W.279
Camille in the Garden with Jean and His Nanny	1873	Sammlung E.G. Bührle, Zürich	59 × 79.5	W.280
The Bench	1873	Metropolitan Museum of Art, New York	60 × 80	W.281
Camille and Jean Monet in the Garden at Argenteuil	1873	Private collection	131 × 97	W.282
Portrait of Mademoiselle Bonnet	1873	Barnes Foundation, Philadelphia	55.5 × 46	W.283
The Artist's House at Argenteuil	1873	Art Institute of Chicago	60.5 × 74	W.284
The Luncheon	1873	Musée d'Orsay, Paris	162 × 203	W.285
The Garden at Argenteuil	1873	National Gallery of Art, Washington D.C.	61 × 82.5	W.286
Camille Monet at the Window, Argenteuil	1873	Virginia Museum of Fine Arts, Richmond	60 × 49.5	W.287
The Sheltered Path	1873	Philadelphia Museum of Art	54 × 65	W.288
The Pond with Ducks in Autumn	1873	Private collection	54 × 65	W.289
Autumn Effect at Argenteuil	1873	Courtauld Institute of Art, London	56 × 75	W.290
Autumn on the Seine at Argenteuil	1873	High Museum of Art, Atlanta	54 × 73	W.291
Carnaval Boulevard des Capucines	1873	Pushkin Museum, Moscow	61 × 80	W.292
Boulevard des Capucines	1873	Nelson-Atkins Museum of Art, Kansas City	80 × 60	W.293
The Trade Basin, Le Havre	1874	Musée d'Art Moderne, Liège	37 × 45	W.294
Embankment in Le Havre	1874	Hermitage Museum, St Petersburg	61 × 81	W.295
Fishing Boats Leaving the Port of Le Havre	1874	Los Angeles County Museum of Art	60 × 101	W.296
Old Outer Port of Le Havre	1874	Philadelphia Museum of Art	60 × 102	W.297
Léon Monet, the Artist's Brother	1874	Private collection	64 × 54	W.297a
The Sea Port in Amsterdam	1874	Private collection	60 × 81	W.298
The Sea at Amsterdam	1874	Private collection	50.5 × 75.5	W.299
Geldersekade of Amsterdam, Winter	1874	Botero Museum, Bogotá	55 × 62	W.300
Amsterdam in the Snow	1874	Rosengart Collection Museum	56 × 73	W.301
The Windmill on the Onbekende Canal, Amsterdam	1874	Museum of Fine Arts, Houston	56 × 65	W.302
View of Amsterdam	1874	Sammlung Rau fuer UNICEF, Arp Museum Bahnhof Rolandseck, Remagen	61 × 101.5	W.303
View of the Prins Hendrikkade and the Kromme Waal in Amsterdam	1874	Van Gogh Museum, Amsterdam	50 × 68	W.304
The Binnen Amstel, Amsterdam	1874	Private collection	55 × 74	W.305
The Bridge, Amsterdam	1874	Shelburne Museum	53.5 × 63.5	W.306
View of the Montalban Tower, Amsterdam	1874	Private collection	60 × 81	W.307
Canal in Amsterdam	1874	Private collection	55 × 65	W.308
The Zuiderkerk, Amsterdam	1874	Philadelphia Museum of Art	54.5 × 65.5	W.309
The Orchard	1874	Private collection	59 × 80	w.310
The Railway Bridge at Argenteuil	1874	Musée d'Orsay, Paris	60 × 80	W.311
The Railway Bridge at Argenteuil	1874	National Gallery of Art, Washington D.C.	60 × 80	W.312
The Road Bridge at Argenteuil	1874	Neue Pinakothek, Munich	58 × 80	W.313
The Road Bridge at Argenteuil	1874	Private collection	50 × 65	W.314
The Bridge at Argenteuil, Grey Weather	1874	Private collection	54 × 73	W.315
Bridge at Argenteuil on a Gray Day	1876	National Gallery of Art, Washington D.C.	61 × 80.5	W.316
The Banks of the Seine at the Argenteuil Bridge	1874	Private collection	54 × 73	W.317
The Railway Bridge at Argenteuil	1874	Philadelphia Museum of Art	54.5 × 73.5	W.318
The Railway Bridge at Argenteuil	1874	Musée d'Orsay, Paris	55 × 72	W.319
The Railway Bridge at Argenteuil	1874	Musée Marmottan Monet, Paris	14.5 × 23	W.320
The Promenade near the Railroad Bridge, Argenteuil	1874	Saint Louis Art Museum	54.5 × 78	W.321
Argenteuil	1874	Artizon Museum, Tokyo	42 × 70	W.322
The Studio Boat	1874	Kröller-Müller Museum, Otterlo	50 × 64	W.323
Boaters at Argenteuil	1874	Private collection	60 × 81	W.324
The Seine at Argenteuil	1874	Rhode Island School of Design Museum, Providence	54 × 73	W.325
The Port at Argenteuil	1874	Private collection	55 × 73	W.326
The Seine near Argenteuil	1874	Private collection	55 × 66	W.327
Sunset on the Seine	1874	Philadelphia Museum of Art	49.5 × 65	W.328
River Banks at Argenteuil	1874	Destroyed in a fire c1950	55 × 65	W.329
The Seine at Argenteuil	1874	Private collection	54 × 65	W.330
Argenteuil Basin with a Single Sailboat	1874	National Gallery of Ireland, Dublin	55 × 65	W.331
The Banks of the Seine near Argenteuil	1874	Private collection	54 × 73	W.332
The banks of the Seine at Petit-Gennevilliers	1874	Private collection	54 × 73	W.333
The Pool seen from the Bridge, Argenteuil	1874	Mie Prefectural Art Museum, Tsu	62 × 81	W.334
The Port of Argenteuil	1874	Indiana University Art Museum, Bloomington	53 × 65	W.335
Sailboat at Le Petit-Gennevilliers	1874	Lucille Ellis Simon Foundation, Santa Monica	56 × 74	W.336
At Petit-Gennevilliers	1874	Private collection	55 × 73	W.337
At Le Petit-Gennevilliers, Sunset	1874	Private collection	54 × 73	W.338
Regatta at Argenteuil	1874	Musée d'Orsay, Paris	60 × 100	W.339
Regatta at Argenteuil	1874	Private collection	59 × 99	W.340
Meadow at Bezons	1874	Alte Nationalgalerie, Berlin	57 × 80	W.341
In the Fields, Summer (Argenteuil)	1874	Private collection	55 × 74	W.341a
Manet painting in Monet's Garden in Argenteuil	1874	Private collection		W.342
Woman sitting on a bench	1874	National Gallery, London	73.5 × 56	W.343
The Main Street at Argenteuil	1874	Private collection	70 × 46	W.344
The Allee du Champ de Foire at Argenteuil	1874	Private collection	50 × 61	W.345
The Promenade at Argenteuil, Soleil Couchant	1874	Private collection	60 × 81	W.346
The Duck Pond	1874	Clark Art Institute, Williamstown	73.5 × 60	W.347
Snow at Argenteuil	1874	Museum of Fine Arts, Boston	57 × 74	W.348
Snow at Argenteuil	1874	Nelson-Atkins Museum of Art, Kansas City	50.5 × 65	W.349
The Pond, Snow Effect	1875	Private collection	60 × 81	W.350
Snow at Argenteuil	1875	National Museum of Western Art, Tokyo	55 × 65	W.351
Snow at Argenteuil	1875	Private collection	71 × 91.5	W.352
Winter Effect in Argenteuil	1875	Private collection	59 × 80	W.353
Winter Effect in Argenteuil	1875	Private collection	50 × 65	W.353a
The Promenade at Argenteuil on a Winter Evening	1875	Private collection	59 × 79	W.354
The Main Street Entering to Argenteuil, Winter	1875	Private collection	55 × 65	W.355
Train in the Snow, the Locomotive	1875	Musée Marmottan Monet, Paris	59 × 78	W.356
View of Argenteuil in the Snow	1875	Museum of Art and History (Geneva)	55 × 74	W.357
Boulevard St-Denis, Argenteuil, Snow Effect	1875	Museum of Fine Arts, Boston	66 × 81	W.357a
View of Argenteuil in the Snow	1875	Nelson-Atkins Museum of Art, Kansas City	55 × 68	W.358
Snow Effect, The Boulevard de Pontoise at Argenteuil	1875	Kunstmuseum Basel	60.5 × 81.5	W.359
	1875	Private collection	58.5 × 80	W.360
White Frost	1875	Private collection	54.5 × 73	W.361
Snow Effect with Setting Sun	1875	Musée Marmottan Monet, Paris	53 × 64	W.362
Frost	1875	Private collection	60 × 63	W.363
Bords de la Seine à Argenteuil	1875	Private collection		Authenticity in doubt
Coal Dockers	1875	Musée d'Orsay, Paris	55 × 66	W.364
A Corner of the Apartment	1875	Musée d'Orsay, Paris	60 × 80	W.365
Camille Embroidering	1875	Barnes Foundation, Philadelphia	65 × 55	W.366
The Bridge at Chatou	1875	Museo Nacional de Bellas Artes, Buenos Aires	60 × 100	W.367
Pleasure Boats, Argenteuil	1875	Private collection	54 × 65	W.368
Red Boats, Argenteuil	1875	Fogg Museum, Cambridge	60 × 81	W.369
Red Boats at Argenteuil	1875	Musée de l'Orangerie, Paris	55 × 65	W.370
The Port of Argenteuil	1875	Private collection	54 × 74	W.371
Boats at Argenteuil	1875	Private collection	61 × 80	W.372
The Seine at Argenteuil	1875	Legion of Honor, San Francisco	60 × 80	W.373
The Riverbank at Le Petit-Gennevilliers, Sunset	1875	Private collection	54 × 73	W.374
The Riverbank at Petit-Gennevilliers	1875	Private collection	61 × 80	W.375
Les Coteaux d'Orgemont	1875	Private collection	51 × 65.5	W.376
Summer, Poppy Field	1875	Private collection	60 × 81	W.377
Meadow with Poplars (also known as Poplars near Argenteuil)	1875	Museum of Fine Arts, Boston	54.5 × 65.5	W.378
La Promenade, Argenteuil	1875	Pola Museum of Art, Hakone	59.5 × 80	W.379
The Walk, Argenteuil	1875	Musée Marmottan Monet, Paris	60 × 81	W.379a
Poppy Field, Argenteuil	1875	Metropolitan Museum of Art, New York	54 × 73.5	W.380
The Walk, Woman with a Parasol	1875	National Gallery of Art, Washington D.C.	100 × 81	W.381
Camille Monet and a Child in the Artist's Garden in Argenteuil	1875	Museum of Fine Arts, Boston	55 × 66	W.382
Ladies in Flowers	1875	National Gallery in Prague	54 × 65.5	W.383
In the Garden	1875	Private collection	76 × 101	W.384
Woman with a Parasol in the Garden at Argenteuil	1875	Private collection	75 × 100	W.385
Artist's Family in the Garden	1875	Private collection	61 × 80	W.386
Camille Monet in Japanese Costume	1875	Museum of Fine Arts, Boston	231.5 × 142	W.387
The Lane in Epinay, Snow Effect	1875	Private collection	61 × 100	W.388
Towpath at Argenteuil in the Snow	1875	Albright Knox Art Gallery, Buffalo	60 × 105	W.389
The Studio Boat	1875–76	Barnes Foundation, Philadelphia	72 × 60	W.390
The Studio Boat	1875	Private collection	80 × 100	W.391
The Studio Boat	1875	Private collection	55 × 74	W.392
The Studio Boat	1876	Musée d'Art et d'Histoire (Neuchâtel)	54 × 65	W.393
The Mall at Argenteuil	1876	Private collection	55 × 65.5	W.394
Wood Lane	1876	Private collection	73 × 54	W.395
Willows on the River	1876	Private collection	71.5 × 60	W.396
The Ball Shaped Tree, Argenteuil (detail)	1876	Private collection	60 × 81	W.397
The Parc Monceau, Paris	1876	Metropolitan Museum of Art, New York	60 × 81	W.398
Monceau Park	1876	Sen-oku Hakuko Kan, Kyoto	59.5 × 73	W.399
The Parc Monceau	1876	Private collection	54 × 73	W.400
The Tuileries	1876	Musée Marmottan Monet, Paris	54 × 73	W.401
The Tuileries Gardens	1876	Private collection	60 × 80	W.402
Les Tuileries ('The Tuileries')	1876	Musée d'Orsay, Paris	50 × 74	W.403
View of the Tuileries (study) (study)	1876	Private collection	54 × 65	W.404
In the Meadow	1876	Private collection	60 × 82	W.405
Monet's House in Argenteuil	1876	Private collection	63 × 52	W.406
Woman in the Garden	1876	Hermitage Museum, St Petersburg	50 × 65	W.407
Relaxing in the Garden, Argenteuil	1876	Private collection	81 × 60	W.408
Undergrowth in Argenteuil	1876	Private collection	80 × 60	W.409
Camille Monet in the Garden at the House in Argenteuil	1876	Metropolitan Museum of Art, New York	81 × 59	W.410
The Garden	1876	Hermitage Museum, St Petersburg	75 × 100	W.411
The Garden, Hollyhocks	1876	Private collection	73 × 54	W.412
Camille with Green Parasol	1876	Private collection	81 × 60	W.413
The Garden, Gladioli	1876	Detroit Institute of Arts	60 × 81.5	W.414
In the Garden, Gladioli	1876	San Francisco Museum of Modern Art	73 × 54.5	W.415
Turkeys	1877	Musée d'Orsay, Paris	172 × 175	W.416
Rose Bushes in the Garden at Montgeron	1876	Private collection	60 × 81	W.417
Corner of the Garden at Montgeron	1877	Hermitage Museum, St Petersburg	172 × 193	W.418
The Pond at Montgeron	1876	Private collection	60 × 81.5	W.419
The Pond at Montgeron	1877	Hermitage Museum, St Petersburg	172 × 193	W.420
Arriving at Montgeron	1876	Private collection	81 × 60	W.421
La Maison d'Yerres	1876	Private collection	80 × 61	W.422
L'Yerres near Montgeron	1876	Private collection	60 × 82	W.423
View of Yerres	1876	Private collection	54 × 73	W.424
Willows on the Banks of the Yerres	1876	Private collection	54 × 65.5	W.425
The Banks of The Seine in Autumn	1876	Private collection	55 × 75.5	W.426
	1876	Private collection	54 × 70.5	W.427
Sunset on the Seine near Argenteuil	1876	Private collection	54 × 70.5	W.428
Evening at Argenteuil	1876	Private collection	50 × 65	W.429
Study of Rushes at Argenteuil	1876	Private collection	54 × 65	W.430
Wood Lane	1876	Philadelphia Museum of Art	73 × 54	W.431
Wood Lane, Autumn	1876	Private collection	72 × 60	W.432
Hunting	1876	Musée de la Chasse et de la Nature, Paris	173 × 140	W.433
Portrait of Germaine Hoschede with a Doll	1877	Private collection	81 × 60	W.434
Portrait of a Young Girl	1877	Private collection	46 × 38	W.435
Portrait of Camille with a bouquet of violets	1877	Private collection	116 × 88	W.436
A Field at Gennevilliers	1877	Private collection	50 × 61	W.437
The Saint-Lazare Station	1877	Musée d'Orsay, Paris	75 × 100	W.438
The Gare Saint-Lazare: Arrival of a Train	1877	Fogg Museum, Cambridge	82 × 101	W.439
Arrival of the Normandy Train, Gare Saint-Lazare	1877	Art Institute of Chicago	59.5 × 80	W.440
The Saint-Lazare Station	1877	National Gallery, London	53.5 × 72.5	W.441
The Pont de l'Europe, Saint-Lazare Station	1877	Musée Marmottan Monet, Paris	64 × 81	W.442
Exterior of Saint-Lazare Station, Sunlight Effect	1877	Private collection	60 × 80	W.443
Exterior of the Saint-Lazare Station, Arrival of a Train	1877	Private collection	60 × 72	W.444
Track Coming out of Saint-Lazare Station	1877	Pola Museum of Art, Hakone	60 × 80	W.445
Saint-Lazare Station, the Western Region Goods Sheds	1877	Private collection	60 × 80	W.446
Exterior View of the Saint-Lazare Station	1877	Private collection	64 × 81	W.447
Exterior of Saint-Lazare Station (also known as The Signal)	1877	Lower Saxony State Museum, Hanover	65 × 81.5	W.448
La Tranchée des Batignolles	1877	Private collection		W.449
Riverbank in Flower, Argenteuil	1877	Private collection	54 × 66	W.450
Riverbank at Argenteuil	1877	Private collection	60 × 73.5	W.451
The Seine at Argenteuil	1877	Private collection	60 × 73	W.452
Argenteuil, Flowers by the Riverbank	1877	Pola Museum of Art, Hakone	54 × 65	W.453
The Banks of the Seine, Ile de la Grande-Jatte	1878	Private collection	49.5 × 65	W.454
Isle Grande Jatte or Springtime through the Branches	1878	Musée Marmottan Monet, Paris	52 × 63	W.455
The Isle La Grande Jatte	1878	Musée Marmottan Monet, Paris	54 × 65	W.456
The Banks of the Seine at Courbevoie	1878	Collection Grimaldi, Monaco	50 × 64	W.457
The Isle de la Grande Jatte, through the Trees	1878	Private collection	54 × 65	W.458
Spring by the Seine	1878	National Museum of Art, Architecture and Design, Oslo	50 × 65	W.459
Banks of the Seine at La Grande Jatte	1878	Private collection	55 × 74	W,460
L'île de la Grande Jatte	1878	Nichido Gallery, Tokyo	56 × 74	W.461
Wood Lane	1878	Private collection	56 × 46	W.462
Under the Trees, Effect of Sunlight	1878	Private collection	55 × 45.5	W.463
The Avenue	1878	Private collection	73 × 55	W.464
At the Parc Monceau	1878	Metropolitan Museum of Art, New York	73 × 54.5	W.466
The Parc Monceau	1878	Private collection	65 × 54	W.467
The Parc Monceau	1878	Private collection	54 × 65	W.468
The Rue Montorgueil 30th of June 1878	1878	Musée d'Orsay, Paris	80 × 48.5	W.469
The Rue Saint-Denis, 30th of June 1878	1878	Musée des Beaux-Arts de Rouen	76 × 52	W.470
Flowers in a Pot (also known as Roses and Baby's Breath)	1878	Deji Art Museum, Nanjing	82.5 × 62	W.471
Bouquet of Gladioli, Lilies and Daisies	1878	Private collection	83.5 × 65	W.472

== Works 1878–1881 (Vétheuil) ==
Image Title	Year	Location	Dimensions (in cm) Medium	Cat. No. Medium
The Church at Vetheuil	1878	Private collection	61 × 80.5	W.473
The Church at Vetheuil, Snow	1878–79	Scottish National Gallery, Edinburgh	65 × 55	W.474
The Seine at Lavacourt	1878	Private collection	56 × 74.5	W.475
Morning Fog at Lavacourt	1878	Private collection	59 × 80	W.476
La Seine près de Vétheuil	1878	Museum Boijmans Van Beuningen, Rotterdam	62 × 83	W.477
The Seine near Vetheuil, Stormy Weather	1878	Private collection	54 x 81	W.478
Small arm of the Seine at Mousseaux	1878	Private collection	60 x 81	W.479
The Small Arm of the Seine at Mosseaux, Evening	1878	Private collection	50 x 61	W.480
Small Arm of the Seine at Vetheuil	1878	Museum of modern art André Malraux - MuMa	50 x 61	W.481
	1878	Private collection	54 x 65	W.481a
Arm of the Seine near Vetheuil	1878	Private collection	60 x 80	W.482
An arm of the Seine near Vetheuil	1878	Private collection	46 x 73	W.483
An arm of the Seine near Vetheuil	1878	Private collection	46 x 71.5	W.484
Small arm of the Seine near Vetheuil, Autumn	1878	Private collection	51 x 81	W.485
Arm of the Seine near Vetheuil	1878	Musée des Beaux-Arts de Tours	57 x 72	W.486
An arm of the Seine near Vetheuil, Fog	1878	Private collection	55 x 73	W.487
Apple Trees near Vetheuil	1878	Private collection	62 x 82.5	W.488
Apple trees	1878	Private collection	54 x 73	W.489
Apple trees, Vetheuil	1878	Private collection	55 x 66	W.490
Apple Trees on the Chantemesle Hill	1878	Private collection	64 x 81	W.491
Chrysanthemums	1878	Musée d'Orsay, Paris	54.5 x 65	W.492
Chrysanthemums	1878	Private collection	53.5 x 61	W.492a
The Steps	1878	Deji Art Museum, Nanjing	62 x 50	W.493
Farmyard	1878	Private collection	61 x 50	W.494
The Banks of the Seine, Lavacourt	1879	Galerie Neue Meister, Dresden	65 x 80	W.495
Tow Path at Lavacourt	1878	Private collection	60 x 74	W.496
The Banks of the Seine, Lavacourt	1879	Private collection	60 x 90	W.497
The Banks of the Seine, Lavacourt	1878	Private collection	60 x 80	W.498
Banks of the Seine, Lavacourt	1878	Private collection	50 x 64	W.499
Banks of the Seine at Lavacourt	1878	Private collection	54 x 65	W.500
The Village of Lavacourt	1878	Private collection	35.5 x 73	W.501
The Road to Vetheuil	1878	Private collection	49.5 x 60	W.502
Jean-Pierre Hoschede, called "Bebe Jean"	1878	Private collection	41 x 33	W.503
Portrait of Michel Monet	1878	Musée Marmottan Monet, Paris	46 x 37	W.504
Vétheuil Church in Winter	1879	Musée d'Orsay, Paris	65 x 50	W.505
Snow Effect in Vétheuil	1879	Musée d'Orsay, Paris	53 x 71	W.506
Vetheuil in Winter	1879	Frick Collection, New York	69 x 90	W.507
The Road to Vetheuil, Snow Effect	1879	Museum of Fine Arts (St. Petersburg, Florida)	61 x 81.5	W.508
Entering the Village of Vetheuil in Winter	1879	Museum of Fine Arts, Boston	60 x 81	W.509
Village Street, Vetheuil in Winter	1879	Gothenburg Museum of Art	52.5 x 71.5	W.510
Lavacourt, Sun and Snow	1879	Hugh Lane Gallery, Dublin/National Gallery, London	59.5 x 81	W.511
Riverbanks at Lavacourt in snow	1879	Private collection	55 x 74	W.512
Seine at Lavacourt. Effect of Snow	1879	Private collection	55 x 74	W.513
Lavacourt in winter	1879	Private collection	49.5 x 65	W.514
Lavacourt	1879	Unknown	51 x 84	W.515
The Bend of the Seine at Lavacourt, Winter	1879	Private collection	54 x 65	W.516
Winter on the Seine, Lavacourt	1879–80	Portland Art Museum	54 x 65	W.517
Vetheuil in the Fog	1879	Musée Marmottan Monet, Paris	60 x 71	W.518
Plums Blossom	1879	Private collection	65 x 54	W.519
Vetheuil, Flowering Plum Trees	1879	Museum of Fine Arts, Budapest	64.5 x 81	W.520
Vetheuil, Flowering Plum Trees	1879	Private collection	73.5 x 94	W.521
Orchard in Flower	1879	National Gallery in Prague	55 x 65	W.521a
Pear trees in blossom	1879	Private collection	60 x 100	W. 522
The apple tree	1879	Private collection	54 x 65	W. 523
Apple treen in blossom near Vetheuil	1879	Private collection	65 x 92	W. 524
The Cottage	1879	Uehara Museum of Modern Art	48.5 x 64.5	W.524a
Landscape. Vétheuil	1879	Musée d'Orsay, Paris	60 x 73	W.526
Vetheuil	1879	Private collection	65 x 92	W.527
The Seine at Vétheuil, Sun Effect after Rain	1879	Musée d'Orsay, Paris	60 x 81	W.528
The Seine at Vétheuil	1879	Private collection	54 x 73	W.529
The Seine downstream from Vetheuil	1879	Musée d'Art et d'Histoire (Geneva)	46 x 61.5	W.530
Vetheuil, The Church	1880	Southampton Art Gallery	51 x 61	W.531
The Seine at Vétheuil	1879	Musée d'Orsay, Paris	43 x 70	W.532
Vétheuil	1879	National Gallery of Victoria, Melbourne	60 x 81	W.533
Vetheuil in Summer	1879	Art Gallery of Ontario, Toronto	68 x 90	W. 534
A Meadow	1879	Joslyn Art Museum, Omaha	79 x 98	W.535
Poppy Field near Vetheuil	1879	Foundation E.G. Bührle, Zürich	70 x 90	W.536
The Seine at Vetheuil	1879	Musée des Beaux-Arts de Rouen	81 x 60	W.537
La Seine à Lavacourt	1879	Frick Art & Historical Center, Pittsburgh	60 x 80	W.538
The Seine at Lavacourt	1879	Private collection	44 x 59	W. 538a
The Seine at Lavacourt	1879	Private collection	55 x 74	W. 539
The Seine at Lavacourt	1880	Fogg Museum, Cambridge	60 x 81	W.540
Seine at Lavacourt	1879	Private collection	60 x 81.5	W.541
Leon Peltier	1879	Private collection	56 x 38	W.542
Camille Monet on her Deathbed	1879	Musée d'Orsay, Paris	90 x 68	W.543
Still Life with Spanish Melon	1879	Kimbell Art Museum, Fort Worth	90 x 68	W.544
Fruit Basket with Apples and Grapes	1879	Metropolitan Museum of Art, New York	68 x 90	W.545
Still Life – Apples and Grapes	1879	Art Institute of Chicago	65 x 81.5	W.546
Nasturtiums in a Blue Vase	1879	Private collection	46 x 38	W.547
Vase of Nasturtiums	1879	Private collection	77.5 x 62	W.548
The Pheasants	1880	Private collection	68 x 90	W.549
Pheasants and Plovers	1879–80	Minneapolis Institute of Art	68 x 90	W.550
Pheasants, Woodcocks and Partridges	1879	Private collection	89 x 68	W.551
View of Vetheuil in Winter	1879	Private collection	60 x 81	W.552
Frost, Grey Weather	1880	Private collection	60 x 80	W.553
	1880	Private collection	81 x 100	W.554
Frost	1880	Musée d'Orsay, Paris	61 x 100	W.555
Les Glacons, Lavacourt	1880	Private collection	50 x 81	W.556
Winter Sun, Lavacourt	1879–80	Museum of modern art André Malraux - MuMa	55 x 81	W.557
Winter on the Seine at Lavacourt	1880	Private collection	60 x 100	W.558
Vetheuil, Ice Floes	1881	Private collection	71 x 100	W.559
Breakup of Ice, Grey Weather	1880	Museu Calouste Gulbenkian, Lisbon	68 x 90	W.560
Breakup of the Ice, Lavacourt	1880	Palais des Beaux-Arts de Lille	72.5 x 99.5	W.561
Breakup of Ice	1880	Dunedin Public Art Gallery, Dunedin	54 x 65	W.562
Breakup of Ice at Lavacourt	1880	Private collection	46 x 81.5	W.563
The Floes on the Seine at Lavacourt	1880	Private collection	60 x 100	W.564
Breakup of Ice, Grey Weather	1880	University of Michigan Museum of Art, Ann Arbor	60 x 99	W.565
The Thaw at Vétheuil	1880	Thyssen-Bornemisza Museum, Madrid	60 x 100	W.566
Floating Ice	1880	Musée d'Orsay, Paris	61 x 100	W.567
The Ice Floes	1880	Shelburne Museum	97 x 150.5	W.568
Breakup of Ice	1880	Am Römerholz, Winterthur	59 x 98.5	W.569
Breakup of Ice	1880	Private collection	61 x 100	W.570
Breakup of Ice	1880	Museum of Fine Arts Bern	61 x 100	W.571
The Breaking up near Vétheuil	1880	Louvre, Paris	65 x 91.5	W.572
Winter at Lavacourt	1880	Private collection	55.5 x 72.5	W.573
Sunset on the Seine in Winter	1880	Pola Museum of Art, Hakone	60 x 80	W.574
Sun Setting over the Seine at Lavacourt. Winter Effect	1800	Musee Carnavalet, Paris	53 x 80	W.575
Sunset on the Seine at Lavacourt, Winter Effect	1880	Petit Palais	100 x 152	W.576
Sunset	1880	Private collection	50 x 61.5	W.577
The Seine at Lavacourt	1880	Dallas Museum of Art	100 x 150	W.578
Spring in Vétheuil	1880	Museum Boijmans Van Beuningen, Rotterdam	60.5 x 80.5	W.579
	1880	Private collection	60 x 100	W.580
The Road from Vétheuil	1880	The Phillips Collection, Washington D.C.	58.5 x 72.5	W.581
Road of La Roche-Guyon	1880	National Museum of Western Art, Tokyo	59.5 x 72.5	W.582
The Road to La Roche-Guyon	1880	Private collection	60 x 81	W.583
The Road to Vétheuil	1880	Private collection	68 x 90	W.584
Apple Trees in Blossom by the Water	1880	Private collection	73 x 60	W.585
Springtime	1880	Museum of Fine Arts of Lyon	60 x 81	W.586
Above Vetheuil, Spring Effect	1880	Private collection	60 x 100	W.587
The Hamlet of Chantemesle at the Foot of the Rock	1880	Private collection	60 x 80	W.588
Haute-Isle	1880	Private collection	60 x 73	W.589
Late Afternoon in Vetheuil	1880	Private collection	72 x 99	W.590
The Hills at Vetheuil	1880	Private collection	61 x 99	W.591
View of Vétheuil	1880	Metropolitan Museum of Art, New York	80 x 60	W.592
A Poppy Field	1880	Foundation E.G. Bührle, Zürich	73 x 60	W.593
Vétheuil	1880	Kelvingrove Art Gallery and Museum, Glasgow	61 x 79	W.594
Vetheuil seen from the Ile Saint Martin	1880	Private collection	65 x 81	W.595
Vetheuil seen from Ile Saint Martin	1880	Private collection	60 x 79	W.596
Banks of the Seine near Vetheuil	1880	National Gallery of Art, Washington D.C.	73 x 100	W.597
Île aux Fleurs near Vétheuil	1880	Metropolitan Museum of Art, New York	65 x 81	W.598
The Seine at Vétheuil	1880	Metropolitan Museum of Art, New York	60 x 105	W.599
The Seine and the Chantemesle Hills	1880	Private collection	53 x 81	W.600
The Small Arm of the Seine at Vetheuil	1880	Private collection	68.5 x 90	W.601
Vetheuil	1880	Private collection	50 x 76	W.602
View of Vetheuil	1880	Los Angeles County Museum of Art	78 x 64	W.603
View of Vetheuil	1880	Private collection	52 x 62	W.604
Vetheuil in Summer	1880	Metropolitan Museum of Art, New York	60 x 100	W.605
The Seine at Vetheuil	1880	Private collection	54 x 73	W.606
Vetheuil	1880	Museum Folkwang, Essen	60 x 80	W.607
Vetheuil	1880	Berlin State Museums	60 x 100	W.608
View of Vetheuil	1880	Alte Nationalgalerie, Berlin	60 x 100	W.609
The Seine at Vetheuil	1880	Portland Museum of Art	60 x 73	W.610
The Willows	1880	National Gallery of Art, Washington D.C.	66 x 81.5	W.611
The Willows at Vetheuil	1880	Private collection	60 x 74	W.612
Woman Sitting under the Willows	1880	National Gallery of Art, Washington D.C.	81 x 60	W.613
Houses at Vetheuil	1880	Private collection	50 x 65	W.614
The Bank of the Seine	1880	Museo Nacional de Bellas Artes, Buenos Aires	60 x 73	W.615
The Brook near Vetheuil	1880	Private collection	73 x 54	W.616
Portrait of Jeanne Serveau	1880	Private collection	46 x 38	W.617
Monsieur Coqueret (Father)	1880	Barnes Foundation, Philadelphia	51 x 40	W.618
Blanche Hoschede as a child	1880	Musée des Beaux-Arts de Rouen	46 x 38	W.619
Andre Lauvray	1880	Private collection	46 x 38	W.620
The Cliffs of Les Petites-Dalles	1880	Museum of Fine Arts, Boston	59 x 71	W.621
The Sea at Les Petites-Dalles	1880	Private collection	60 x 80.5	W.622
The Wave	1880	Private collection	53 x 72	W. 623
Open Sea, Rough Weather	1880	Private collection	55.5 x 70.4	W.624
Dahlias	1880	Private collection	81 x 65	W.625
Bouquet of Mallows	1880	Courtauld Gallery, London	100 x 81	W.626
Asters	1880	Private collection	83 x 68.5	W.627
Bouquet of Sunflowers	1880	Metropolitan Museum of Art, New York	101 x 81.5	W.628
Jerusalem Artichokes	1880	National Gallery of Art, Washington D.C.	100 x 73	W.629
Basket of Apples	1880	Private collection	65 x 81	W.630
Pears and Grapes	1880	Kunsthalle Hamburg	65 x 81	W.631
Portrait of Jean Monet	1880	Musée Marmottan Monet, Paris	46 x 37	W.632
Michel Monet with a Pompom	1880	Musée Marmottan Monet, Paris	46 x 38	W.633
Chrysanthemums	1880–81	Metropolitan Museum of Art, New York	100 x 81	W.634
Chrysanthèmes rouges	1881	Private collection	82 x 65	W.635
Portrait of Mr Coqueret (son)	1881	Private collection	45 x 38	W.636
Portrait	1881	Unknown, possibly destroyed by the artist		W.637
The Flood of the Seine at Vetheuil	1881	Private collection	65 x 81	W.638
Vetheuil, Prairie inondée	1881	Kasama Nichido Museum of Art	60 x 73.5	W.639
Spring in Vetheuil	1881	Private collection	60 x 79	W.640
The Flood at Vetheuil	1881	E.W.K. Berne	60 x 73.5	W.641
The Flood	1881	Sammlung Rau fuer UNICEF, Arp Museum Bahnhof Rolandseck, Remagen	60 x 100	W.642
The Chateau of Roche-Guyon	1881	Private collection	60 x 80	W.643
Boat at Low Tide at Fecamp	1881	Tokyo Fuji Art Museum	80 x 60	W.644
Boats Lying at Low Tide at Fecamp	1881	Private collection	80 x 66	W.645
Jetty at Fecamp in bad weather	1881	Private collection	54 x 73	W.646
Seascape near Fecamp	1881	Private collection	60 x 81	W.647
The Sea Seen from the Cliffs of Fecamp	1881	Private collection	60 x 75	W.648
Calm Weather, Fecamp	1881	Private collection	60 x 81	W.649
Temps calme, Pourville	1881	Kunstmuseum Basel	60 x 73.5	W.650
Morning by the sea	1881	Private collection	61 x 81	W.651
Fecamp, by the Sea	1881	Museum of modern art André Malraux - MuMa	67 x 80	W.652
Cliff at Grainval near Fécamp	1881	Private collection	61 x 80	W.653
The Cliff at Graibal	1881	Private collection	59 x 72	W.654
View Taken from Grainval	1881	Private collection	61 x 51	W.655
Cliff at Fecamp	1881	Private collection	63.5 x 80	W.656
Cliff near Fecamp	1881	Private collection	61 x 79	W.656a
On the Cliff at Fecamp	1881	Private collection	65 x 81	W.657
The Beach at Fecamp	1881	Private collection	46 x 80	W.658
The Sea at Fecamp	1881	Private collection	60 x 74	W.659
The Sea at Fecamp	1881	Staatsgalerie Stuttgart	65.5 x 82	W.660
Waves Breaking	1881	Fine Arts Museums of San Francisco	60 x 81	W.661
Sea Study	1881	Private collection	50 x 73	W.662
A Stormy Sea	1881	National Gallery of Canada, Ottawa	60 x 74	W.663
Cliffs of Les Petites-Dalles	1881	Private collection	60 x 74	W.664
Cliffs at Les Petites-Dalles	1881	Private collection	60 x 81	W.665
Cliffs at Les Petites-Dalles	1881	Private collection	65 x 81	W.665a
Les Petites-Dalles	1881	Private collection	60 x 81	W.665b
Garden at Vetheuil	1881	Private collection	60 x 73	W.666
The Rocks de Chantemesle	1881	Private collection	59.5 x 77	W.667
Vetheuil at Sunset	1881	Private collection	52 x 62	W.668
Hillsides near Vétheuil	1881	Musée des Beaux-Arts de Rouen	14.4 x 22.1	W.669
Vetheuil	1881	Musée des Beaux-Arts de Rouen	14.4 x 22.6	W.670
The Seine, from Chantemesle's Heights	1881	Musée des Beaux-Arts de Rouen	14.4 x 22.3	W.671
The Church at Vetheuil	1881	Private collection	47 x 73	W.672
The Seine at Vetheuil	1881	Minnesota Marine Art Museum	73 x 100	W.673
The Seine between Vetheuil and La Roche-Guyon	1881	Private collection	60 x 80	W.674
The Banks of the Seine near Vetheuil	1881	Private collection	60 x 79.5	W.675
Wheatfield	1881	Cleveland Museum of Art	65.5 x 81.5	W.676
Champ de coquelicots	1881	Museum Boijmans Van Beuningen, Rotterdam	58 x 79	W.677
Lane in the Poppy Fields, Ile Saint-Martin	1880	Philadelphia Museum of Art	73 x 60	W.678
Landscape on the Ile Saint Martin	1881	Private collection	73 x 60	W.679
Alice Hoschede in the Garden	1881	Private collection	81 x 65	W.680
The Terrace at Vetheuil	1881	Private collection	81 x 65	W.681
Monet's Garden at Vetheuil	1881	Private collection	80 x 65	W.682
The Garden at Vetheuil	1881	Norton Simon Museum, Pasadena	100 x 81	W.683
Monet's Garden at Vetheuil	1881	Private collection	100 x 80	W.684
The Artist's Garden at Vetheuil	1881	National Gallery of Art, Washington D.C.	150 x 120	W.685
Hut in Trouville, Low Tide	1881	Thyssen-Bornemisza Museum, Madrid	60 x 73.5	W.686
Seacoast at Trouville	1881	Museum of Fine Arts, Boston	60 x 81	W.687
Cliffs of Varengeville, Gust of Wind	1881	Private collection	81 x 65.5	W.688
Falaise de Sainte-Adresse, temps gris	1881	Ordrupgaard, Copenhagen	60 x 73.5	W.689
The Garden Gate at Vetheuil	1881	Private collection	60 x 73	W.690
The Garden Gate	1881	Private collection	73 x 60	W.691
Flowers at Vetheuil	1881	Private collection	60 x 75	W.692
Flowers at Vetheuil	1881	Museum of Fine Arts, Boston	92 x 73	W.693
Gladiolus	1881	Pola Museum of Art, Hakone	99 x 41	W.694
Gladiolus	1881	Pola Museum of Art, Hakone	99 x 41	W.695
View of Vétheuil	1881	Albertina, Vienna	65 x 87	W.696
	1881	Private collection	58.5 x 72.5	W.697
A Spot on the Banks of the Seine	1881	Private collection	81 x 60	W.698
Banks of the Seine near Vetheuil	1881	Private collection	65 x 81.5	W.699
Near Vetheuil	1881	Private collection	65 x 81	W.700
Arms of the Seine at Vetheuil	1881	Private collection	60.5 x 99.5	W.701
Evening Effect of the Seine	1881	Private collection	60 x 80	W.702
The River	1881	Private collection	54 x 73	W.703
The Seine at Vetheuil	1881	Private collection	66 x 81	W.704
In the Meadow (Vetheuil]	1881	Private collection	42 x 52	W.705

== Works 1881–1883 (Poissy) ==
Image Title	Year	Location	Dimensions (cm.)	Cat. no. Medium
Port of Dieppe, Evening	1882	Dixon Gallery and Gardens, Memphis	69 x 73	W.706
Dieppe	1882	Private collection	60 x 73	W.707
Cliff near Dieppe	1882	Private collection	58.5 x 78.7	W.708
Boats on the Beach at Pourville, Low Tide	1882	Kreeger Museum, Washington D.C.	60.5 x 79.5	W.709
Beach and Cliffs at Pourville	1882	Private collection	60 x 73	W.710
Foggy Morning at Pourville	1882	Birmingham Museum of Art	60 x 73	W.711
Low Tide at Pourville	1882	Private collection	60 x 81	W.712
Seascape, Pourville	1882	Private collection	50 x 61	W.713
Fishing boats off Pourville	1882	Private collection	54 x 65	W.714
	1882	Private collection	57 x 71	W.715
Low Tide at Pourville	1882	Cleveland Museum of Art	60 x 81	W.716
Pourville, near Dieppe	1882	Private collection	60 x 81	W.717
Rough Sea at Pourville	1882	Private collection	60 x 73	W.718
Cliff near Dieppe	1882	Carnegie Museum of Art, Pittsburgh	60 x 81	W.719
Cliffs, Grey Weather	1882	Private collection	54 x 73	W.720
Cliffs at Pourville in the Fog	1882	Private collection	60 x 73	W.721
Low Tide at Varengeville	1882	Thyssen-Bornemisza Museum, Madrid	60 x 81	W.722
Varengeville, Low Tide	1882	Winterthur Museum of Art	60 x 70	W.723
The Effect of Fog near Dieppe	1882	Private collection	60 x 81	W.724
The Church at Varengeville, Grey Weather	1882	Speed Art Museum, Louisville	65 x 81	W.725
The Church at Varengeville, Sunset	1882	Private collection	65 x 81	W.726
The Church at Varengeville, against the Sunset	1882	Barber Institute of Fine Arts, Birmingham	65 x 81	W.727
The Church at Varengeville and the Gorge of Les Moutiers	1882	Columbus Museum of Art	60 x 81	W.728
The Coast of Varengeville	1882	Private collection	65 x 81	W.729
The Gorge at Varengeville	1882	Legion of Honor, San Francisco	65 x 81	W.730
The Customs House, Morning Effect	1882	Metropolitan Museum of Art, New York	60 x 81	W.731
Fisherman's Cottage at Varengeville	1882	Museum Boijmans Van Beuningen, Rotterdam	60 x 78	W.732
Custom Officer's Cabin	1882	Newark Museum	60 x 71	W.733
The Fisherman's House at Varengeville, cloudy weather	1882	Private collection	60 x 73	W.734
Custom's Post at Dieppe	1882	Metropolitan Museum of Art, New York	58.4 x 69.8	W.735
Custom's House, Morning Effect	1882	Private collection	54 x 65	W.736
Customs House. Afternoon Effect	1882	Musée d'Orsay, Paris	58 x 81	W.737
Custom's House, Rough Sea	1882	Private collection	58 x 81	W.738
House of the Customs Officer, Varengeville	1882	Fogg Museum, Cambridge	62 x 76	W.739
Rising Tide in Pourville	1882	Brooklyn Museum, New York	65 x 81	W.740
Fisherman's House at Petit Ailly	1882	Private collection	65 x 81	W.741
The Customs House at Pourville	1882	Private collection	60 x 73	W.742
Customs House	1882	Philadelphia Museum of Art	60 x 81	W.743
The Chef, Pere Paul	1882	Österreichische Galerie Belvedere	64 x 51	W.744
Eugenie Graff (Madame Paul)	1882	Fogg Museum, Cambridge	65 x 54	W.745
Head of the Dog	1882	Private collection	36 x 29	W.745a
The Galettes	1882	Private collection	65 x 81	W.746
Les Tilleuls à Poissy	1882	Private collection	81 x 65	W.747
Anglers on the Seine at Poissy	1882	Österreichische Galerie Belvedere	60 x 81	W.748
Two Anglers	1882	Private collection	38 x 52	W.749
Undergrowth in the Forest of Saint-Germain	1882	Private collection	81 x 65	W.750
Edge of the Cliffs at Pourville	1882	Private collection	61 x 100	W.751
Edge of the Cliff at Pourville	1882	Private collection	60 x 81	W.752
Path in the Wheat in Pourville	1882	Denver Art Museum	58.2 x 78	W.753
Cliff at Pourville	1882	National Gallery of Art, Washington D.C.	60 x 100	W.754
View over the Sea	1882	Nationalmuseum, Stockholm	65 x 81	W.755
On the Cliff at Pourville Clear Weather	1882	Museum of Modern Art, New York	65 x 81	W.756
Edges of the cliff at Pourville	1882	Private collection	60 x 73	W.757
The Cliff Walk, Pourville	1882	Art Institute of Chicago	65 x 81	W.758
The Cliff at Dieppe	1882	Kunsthaus Zürich	65 x 81	W.759
Path at La Cavée at Pourville	1882	Private collection	73 x 60	W.760
Path at Pourville	1882	Private collection	73 x 60	W.761
The Path at La Cavee, Pourville	1882	Museum of Fine Arts, Boston	60 x 81	W.762
The Path	1882	Private collection	60 x 73	W.763
Pourville	1882	Private collection	54 x 65	W.764
The Valley of the Scie at Pourville	1882	Private collection	60 x 81	W.765
	1882	Private collection	65 x 81	W.766
The Rocks at Pourville, Low Tide	1882	Memorial Art Gallery	64.3 x 78.7	W.767
Fishing Nets at Pourville	1882	Kunstmuseum Den Haag	60 x 81	W.768
Fishing Nets at Pourville	1882	Private collection	60 x 73	W.769
Un Parc à Pourville	1882	Private collection	65 x 81	W.770
Sunset at Pourville, Open Sea	1882	Private collection	54 x 73	W.771
Marine near Étretat	1882	Philadelphia Museum of Art	54 x 73	W.772
The Sea at Pourville	1882	Private collection	54 x 65	W.773
Marine	1882	Private collection	54 x 65	W.774
Seascape at Pourville	1882	Columbus Museum of Art	60 x 100	W.775
Low Tide at Pourville	1882	Private collection	65 x 100	W.776
Low Tide at Pourville	1882	Private collection	65 x 100	W.776a
The Beach at Pourville, Sunset	1882	Musée Marmottan, Paris	60 x 73	W.777
L'Ally Point, Low Tide	1882	Private collection	60 x 100	W.778
The Cliffs at Pourville	1882	Private collection	46 x 61	W.778a
Low Tide at Pourville, Misty Weather	1882	Private collection	60 x 81	W.779
The Beach at Pourville	1882	Private collection	60 x 81	W.780
Sunset at Pourville	1882	Kreeger Museum, Washington D.C.	60 x 81	W.781
	1882	Private collection	60 x 73	W.782
Sailboats at Sea, Pourville	1882	Private collection	60 x 81	W.783
Sailboats at Sea, Pourville	1882	Private collection	18 x 38	W.784
Cliffs and Sailboats at Pourville	1882	Private collection	54 x 81	W.785
Fishing Boats by the Beach and the Cliffs of Pourville	1882	Private collection	60 x 81	W.786
Beach and Cliffs at Pourville, Morning Effect	1882	Tokyo Fuji Art Museum	60 x 73	W.787
Cliffs near Pourville	1882	Rijksmuseum Twenthe, Enschede	60 x 81	W.788
Cliff	1882	Private collection	54 x 65	W.789
Marine	1882	Private collection	54 x 65	W.790
The Cliffs at Varengeville	1882	Private collection	60 x 81	W.791
Shadows on the Sea. The Cliffs at Pourville	1882	Ny Carlsberg Glyptotek, Copenhagen	57 x 80	W.792
Low Tide at Varengeville	1882	Private collection	60 x 81	W.793
The Church at Varengeville, morning effect	1882	Private collection	60 x 73	W.794
The Church at Varengeville, morning effect	1882	Private collection	60 x 73	W.795
The Church at Varengeville	1882	Private collection	60 x 81	W.796
The "Fonds" at Varengeville	1882	Pola Museum of Art, Hakone	65 x 81	W.797
The Fir Trees at Varengeville	1882	Private collection	60 x 73	W.798
An Avenue of Fir Trees Varengeville	1882	Private collection	73 x 60	W.799
Fir Trees at Varengeville	1882	Private collection	60 x 81	W.800
Pine Trees at Varengeville	1882	Unknown, stolen during World War II		W.800a
Pine Trees at Varengeville	1882	Private collection	65 x 81	W.801
The Cliffs of Varengeville, Gust of Wind	1882	Private collection	60 x 73	W.802
The Path of Petit Ailly at Varengeville	1882	Private collection	60 x 73	W.803
The Sunken Road in the Cliff at Varangeville	1882	The New Art Gallery Walsall	60 x 73	W.804
Fisherman's Cottage on the Cliffs at Varengeville	1882	Museum of Fine Arts, Boston	61 x 88.3	W.805
Cliff at Grainval	1882	Private collection	65 x 81	W.806
Beach in Pourville	1882	National Museum, Poznań	60 x 73	W.807
Waves and Rocks at Pourville	1882	Private collection	60 x 73	W.808
Vase of Peonies	1882	Private collection	100 x 81	W.809
Flowers in a Vase	1882	Philadelphia Museum of Art	80 x 45	W.810
Roses in a Blue Pitcher	1882	Private collection	52 x 38	W.811
Vase of Chrysanthemums	1882	Private collection		W.812
Mallows	1882	Private collection	113 x 38	W.813
Hanging Pheasants	1882	Private collection	113 x 38	W.814
Double-Flower Door	1883	Deji Art Museum, Nanjing		
	1882–83	Private collection	65 x 81	W.815
Etretat, the cliff of Aval at sunset	1883	Private collection	60 x 81	W.816
The Cliff, Étretat, Sunset	1883	North Carolina Museum of Art, Raleigh	55 x 81	W.817
Sunset at Étretat	1883	Museum of Fine Arts of Nancy	60 x 73	W.818
Étretrat, Sunset	1883	Private collection	60 x 73	W.818a
Cliff and Porte d'Aval	1883	Private collection	60 x 81	W.819
Cliff and Porte d'Aval in Stormy Weather	1883	Museum of Montserrat	73 x 100	W.820
Stormy Sea in Étretat	1883	Museum of Fine Arts of Lyon	81 x 100	W.821
Hollowed Cliff near Étretat	1883	Wallraf–Richartz Museum	73 x 100	W.822
Fishing Boats	1883	Private collection	65 x 92	W.823
Boats on the Beach	1883	Private collection	65 x 92	W.824
Fishing Boats at Etretat	1883	Private collection	60 x 73	W.825
Rough weather at Étretat	1883	National Gallery of Victoria, Melbourne	65 x 81	W.826
Étretat, the Western Cliffs at Porte d'Amont, Rough Seas	1883	Private collection	65 x 81	W.827
Effect of Waves at Etretat	1883	Matsuoka Museum of Art, Tokyo	60 x 73	W.827a
Beach at Etretat	1883	Musée d'Orsay, Paris	65 x 81	W.828
Boats on the Beach at Etretat	1883	Fondation Bemberg, Toulouse	65 x 81	W.829
Morning at Etretat	1883	Oyamazaki Villa Museum of Art, Kyoto	65 x 81	W.830
The Needle of Etretat, Low Tide	1883	Private collection	60 x 81	W.831
The Manneporte	1883	Metropolitan Museum of Art, New York	65 x 81	W.832
The Manneport, seen from below	1883	Private collection	73 x 92	W.833
	1883	Private collection	60 x 100	W.834
Islets at Port-Villez	1883	Private collection	65 x 92	W.835
Landscape at Port-Villez	1883	Museo Soumaya, Mexico City	65 x 81	W.836
Landscape at Villez near Vernon	1883	Private collection	73 x 92	W.837
Summer Effect on the Seine at Port-Villez	1883	Hachioji Municipal Museum	73 x 92	W.838
The Hill at Notre-Dame-de-la-Mer on the Seine	1883	Private collection	65 x 81	W.839
The Towpath at Grainval	1883	Private collection	65 x 81	W.840
Islets at Port-Villez	1883	Private collection	65 x 81	W.841
The Church at Vernon	1883	Private collection	65 x 81	W.842
View of the Church at Vernon	1883	Yamagata Museum of Art	65 x 81	W.843
By the River at Vernon	1883	Private collection	60 x 73	W.844
Houses on the Old Bridge at Vernon	1883	New Orleans Museum of Art	60 x 81	W.845
Luncheon under the Canopy	1883	Private collection	116 x 136	W.846
Michel Monet in a Blue Sweater	1883	Musée Marmottan, Paris	46 x 38	W.847
Vase of Poppies	1883	Museum Boijmans Van Beuningen, Rotterdam	100 x 60	W.848
Poppies in a China Vase	1883	Private collection	100 x 61	W.849

== Works 1884 (Bordighera, Italy) ==
Image Title	Year	Location	Dimensions (cm.)	Cat. no. Medium
Road to Monte Carlo	1883	Private collection	65 x 81	W.850
Near Monte Carlo	1883	Private collection	65 x 81	W.851
Bordighera, Italy	1884	Museum Barberini, Potsdam	60 x 73	W.852
View of Bordighera	1884	Hammer Museum, Los Angeles	65 x 81	W.853
Villas in Bordighera	1884	Art Institute of Chicago	65 x 81	W.854
Strada Romana, Bordighera	1884	Museum Barberini, Potsdam	65 x 81	W.855
Villas at Bordighera	1884	Santa Barbara Museum of Art	73 x 92	W.856
Villas in Bordighera	1884	Musée d'Orsay, Paris	115 x 130	W.857
Villas at Bordighera	1884	Private collection	60 x 73	W.857a
Valle Buona near Bordighera	1884	Dallas Museum of Art	65 x 92	W.858
The Valley of Sasso, Blue Effect	1884	Private collection	65 x 92	W.859
Olive and Palm Trees, Valley of Sasso	1884	Private collection	65 x 81	W.860
The Valley of Sasso	1884	San Francisco Museum of Modern Art	65 x 81	W.861
The Valley of Sasso, Sunlight effect	1884	Musée Marmottan Monet, Paris	65 x 81	W.862
The Valley of Sasso, Bordighera	1884	Private collection	65 x 81	W.863
Burgo Marina at Bordighera	1884	Private collection	65 x 81	W.864
The Moreno Garden at Bordighera	1884	Norton Museum of Art, West Palm Beach	73 x 92	W.865
Garden at Bordighera, Impression of Morning	1884	Hermitage Museum, St Petersburg	65 x 81	W.866
Bordighera, the House of the Gardener	1884	Private collection	60 x 73	W.867
Study of Olive Trees	1884	Private collection	73 x 60	W.868
Olive Trees in Bordighera	1884	Private collection	65 x 81	W.869
The Olive Tree Wood in the Moreno Garden	1884	Private collection	60 x 73	W.870
Study of Olive Trees at Bordighera	1884	Private collection	60 x 73	W.871
Grove of Olive Trees in Bordighera	1884	Private collection	65 x 81	W.872
Under the Lemon Trees	1884	Ny Carlsberg Glyptotek, Copenhagen	73 x 60	W.873
Small Country Farm in Bordighera	1884	Joslyn Art Museum, Omaha	73 x 92	W.874
Palm Trees, Bordighera	1884	Private collection	92 x 73	W.875
A Palm Tree at Bordighera	1884	Private collection	60 x 73	W.876
Palm Trees at Bordighera	1884	Metropolitan Museum of Art, New York	65 x 81	W.877
View of Ventimiglia	1884	Kelvingrove Art Gallery and Museum, Glasgow	65 x 92	W.878
View taken near Ventimiglia	1884	Private collection	65 x 81	W.879
The French Coast Seen from Bordighera	1884	Private collection		W.880
The Valley of the Nervia	1884	Metropolitan Museum of Art, New York	65 x 81	W.881
Dolceacqua	1884	Private collection	73 x 92	W.882
The Castle at Dolceacqua	1884	Musée Marmottan Monet, Paris	92 x 73	W.883
Bridge at Dolceacqua	1884	Clark Art Institute, Williamstown	65 x 81	W.884
The Valley of the Nervia with Dolceacqua	1884	Private collection	65 x 81	W.885
Portrait of an English Painter, Bordighera	1884	Tel Aviv Museum of Art	52 x 41	W.886
Orange Branch Bearing Fruit	1884	Museum of Fine Arts, Houston	53 x 38	W.887
Lemons on a Branch	1884	Private collection	65 x 54	W.888
The Red Road near Menton	1884	Stedelijk Museum, Amsterdam	65 x 81	W.889
The Corniche of Monaco	1884	Rijksmuseum, Amsterdam	74 x 92	W.890
The Path to Menton	1884	Private collection	139 x 180	W.891
Self Portrait in his Studio	1884	Musée Marmottan Monet, Paris		W.891a
The Bay of Monaco	1884	Private collection	60 x 73	W.891b
Monte Carlo seen from Roquebrune	1884	Portland Museum of Art	65 x 81	W.892
Monte Carlo seen from Roquebrune	1884	Unknown		W.892a
Cap Martin	1884	Musée des Beaux-Arts Tournai	65 x 81	W.893
Cap Martin	1884	Private collection	73 x 92	W.894
Rocks and Sea	1884	Unknown	63 x 81	W.895
Cap Martin	1884	Private collection	65 x 81	W.896
Coastal Road at Cap Martin, near Menton	1884	Museum of Fine Arts, Boston	68 x 84	W.897

== Works 1884–1888 (Giverny) ==
Image Title	Year	Location	Dimensions (cm.)	Cat. no. Medium
The River Epte at Giverny	1884	Private collection	60 x 73	W.899
Haystacks at Giverny	1884	Pushkin Museum, Moscow	65 x 81	W.900
Haystacks, Overcast Day	1884	Private collection	65 x 81	W.901
Haystacks at Giverny	1884	Private collection	65 x 81	W.902
Cliffs at Les Petites-Dalles	1884	Kreeger Museum, Washington D.C.	60 x 73	W.903
Cliffs at Les Petites-Dalles	1884	Private Collection	60 x 73	W.904
Low Tide at Les Petites-Dalles	1884	Private collection	60 x 73	W.905
At Les Petites-Dalles	1884	Private collection	65 x 81	W.906
Etretat, the Beach and the Porte d'Aval	1884	Marauchi Art Museum, Tokyo	60 x 73	W.907
The Rock Needle and the Porte-d'Aval	1884	Kunstmuseum Basel	60 x 81	W.908
The Arm of the Siene at Jeufosse, Afternoon	1884	Private collection	60 x 73	W.909
Jeufosse, the Effect in the Late Afternoon	1884	The Museum of Modern Art, Gunma	60 x 81	W.910
Autumn at Jeufosse	1884	Private collection	60 x 73	W.911
The Train at Jeufosse	1884	Private collection	60 x 81	W.912
The Train at Jeufosse	1884	Private collection	60 x 85	W.912a
Banks of the Seine at Jeufosse, Autumn	1884	Private collection	54.6 x 73.6	W.913
Banks of the Seine at Jeufosse: Clear Weather	1884	Private collection	60 x 81	W.914
Rowboat on the Seine at Jeufosse	1884	Private collection	60 x 73	W.915
Autumn at Jeufosse	1884	Private collection	60 x 73	W.916
Arm of the Jeufosse, Autumn	1884	Private collection	610 x 73	W.917
Peasants House at Giverny	1884	Private collection	65 x 81	W.918
Red and Pink Poppies	1884	Private collection	119.5 x 37	W.919
White Poppy	1883	Private collection	128.5 x 37	W.920
Anemones	1885	Private collection	16 x 40	W.921
Daffodils	1882–85	Private collection	16 x 40	W.922
Branch of Lemons	1884	Private collection	50.5 x 37	W.923
Branch of Oranges	1882–85	Museum of Fine Arts, Houston	50.5 x 37	W.924
Vase of Chrysanthemums	1882–85	Private collection		W.925
Sunflowers	1882–85	Private collection	128.5 x 37	W.926
Chrysanthemums	1883	Private collection	16 x 40	W.927
Daffodils	1885	Private Collection	16 x 40	W.928
White Azaleas in a Pot	1885	Private collection	50.5 x 37	W.929
Still Life with Anemones	1885	Private collection	50.5 x 37	W.930
Vase of Dahlias	1883	Private collection	128.5 x 37	W.931
Dahlias	1883	Private collection	128.5 x 37	W.932
Yellow Daisies	1883	Private collection	16 x 40	W.933
White Daisies	1883	Private collection	16 x 40	W.934
Peaches	1883	Private collection	50.5 x 37	W.935
Basket of Apples	1883	Private collection	50.5 x 37	W.936
Dahlias	1883	Private collection	128.5 x 37	W.937
Gladioli	1882–85	Private collection	128.5 x 37	W.938
Anemonies	1885	Private collection	16 x 40	W.939
Yellow Daisies	1885	Private collection	16 x 40	W.940
Three Pots of Tulips	1883	Private collection	50.5 x 37	W.941
Vase of Tulips	1885	Private collection	50.5 x 37	W.942
Red Azalias in a Pot	1883	Private collection	127 x 37	W.943
Cobeas	1883	Private collection	119.5 x 37	W.944
Branch of White and Pink Azaleas	1885	Private collection	16 x 40	W.945
Branch of White and Pink Azaleas	1885	Private collection	16 x 40	W.946
Vase of Chrysanthemums	1883	Private collection	50.5 x 37	W.947
Pot of White Azaleas	1885	Private collection	50.5 x 37	W.948
Red Lilies	1883	Private collection	128 x 37	W.949
Oriental Lily	1883	Private collection	128 x 37	W.950
Peaches	1882	Private collection	16 x 40	W.951
Peaches	1885	Private collection	16 x 40	W.952
Christmas Roses	1883	Private collection	50.5 x 37	W.953
Basket of Grapes, Quinces and Pears	1882–85	Columbus Museum of Art	50.5 x 37	W.954
Plums and Apricots	1885	Private collection	19 x 38	W.955
Vase of Tulips	1885	Private collection	52 x 38	W.956
Vase of Tulips	1885	Private collection	52 x 38	W.957
Pots of Tulips	1885	Private collection	51 x 38	W.958
Anemones	1885	Private collection	16 x 39.5	W.959
Flowers	1885	Private collection	17.5 x 37.5	W.960
Winter at Giverny	1885	Pola Museum of Art, Hakone	65 x 81	W.961
The Seine at Port-Villez. Snow Effect	1885	Private collection		W.962
	1885	Private collection	44.5 x 55.5	W.962a
Frost at Giverny	1885	Private collection	54 x 71	W.963
Frost	1885	Private collection	60 x 80	W.964
Entrance to Giverny under the snow	1885	Private collection	65 x 81	W.965
Road to Giverny in Winter, Sunset	1885	Private collection	65 x 81	W.966
Road to Giverny in Winter	1885	Private collection	67 x 98	W.967
Road to Giverny in Winter	1885	Private collection	60 x 81	W.968
	1885	Private collection	60 x 81	W.969
Road to Giverny	1885	Private collection	60 x 81	W.970
Les Roches at Falaise near Giverny	1885	Private collection	65 x 8	W.971
Houses on the side of the Road	1885	Private collection	65 x 8	W.972
Hamlet of Falaise, Winter countryside	1885	Private collection	60 x 73	W.973
Falaise, near Giverny	1885	Private collection	60 x 81	W.974
Winter Landscape at the Val de Falaise	1885	Private collection	65 x 81	W.975
Valley of Falaise in Winter	1885	Private collection	63.5 x 79	W.976
Houses at Falaise in the Fog	1885	Private collection	73 x 92	W.977
The Valley of Falaise	1885	Private collection	73 x 92	W.978
	1885	Private collection	73.5 x 73.5	W.979
Spring on the Banks of the Epte	1885	Private collection	65 x 81	W.980
Willows in Springtime	1885	Private collection	65 x 81	W.981
Trees by the River, Springtime in Giverny	1885	Private collection	81 x 100	W.982
The Willow (also known as Spring on the Epte)	1885	Private collection	65 x 92	W.983
The River Epte	1885	Private collection	81 x 65	W.984
River and Mill near Giverny	1885	Private collection	72 x 51	W.985
Spring in Giverny, Morning Effect	1885	Private collection	60 x 81	W.986
Spring in Giverny, Afternoon Effect	1885	Museum of Fine Arts (St. Petersburg, Florida)	60 x 81	W.987
Pear Trees in Flower	1885	Private collection	65 x 81	W.988
	1885	Private collection	75 x 75	W.989
The Church at Bennecourt	1885	Private collection	80 x 73	W.990
Meadow at Giverny	1885	Private collection	60 x 73	W.991
Meadow at Giverny	1885	Private collection	65 x 81	W.992
Haystacks at Giverny	1885	Private collection	65 x 81	W.993
Haystacks	1885	Ohara Museum of Art, Kurashiki	65 x 81	W.994
Meadow with Haystacks near Giverny	1885	Museum of Fine Arts, Boston	73.6 x 93.4	W.995
Flowery Meadow	1885	Private collection	65 x 81	W.996
Poppy Field at Giverny	1885	Virginia Museum of Fine Arts, Richmond	60 x 73	W.997
Poppy Field	1885	Private collection	65 x 81	W.998
Poppy Field at Giverny	1885	Musée d'Orsay, Paris	65 x 81	W.999
Poppy Field in a Hollow near Giverny	1885	Museum of Fine Arts, Boston	65 x 81	W.1000
Road near Giverny	1885	Private collection	65 x 81	W.1001
Road near Giverny	1885	Private collection	65 x 81	W.1002
Landscape at Port-Villez	1885	Private collection	65 x 92	W.1003
The Banks of the Seine at Port-Villez	1885	Private collection	65 x 81	W.1004
The Seine near Giverny	1885	Private collection	65 x 92	W.1006
The Seine near Giverny	1885	Rhode Island School of Design Museum, Providence	65 x 92	W.1007
Arm of the Seine at Giverny	1885	Musée Marmottan Monet, Paris	65 x 92	W.1008
Etretat: The Beach and the Falaise d'Amont	1885	Private collection	60 x 81	W.1009
Cliffs at Amont	1885	Private collection	60 x 73	W.1010
Cliff and Porte d'Amont, Morning Effect	1885	Musée Marmottan Monet, Paris	50 x 61	W.1011
The Beach and the Falaise d'Amont	1885	Art Institute of Chicago	67.5 x 64.5	W.1012
Fishing Boats, Etretat	1885	Musée Eugène Boudin, Honfleur	60 x 81	W.1013
Cliff of Aval and the Porte d'Aiguille	1885	Private collection	59 x 80	W.1014
Etretat, the Port d'Aval	1855	Private collection	60 x 81	W.1014a
Etretat, End of the Day	1885	Private collection	50 x 61	W.1015
Etretat, End of the Day	1885	Royal Museums of Fine Arts of Belgium, Brussels	60 x 73	W.1015a
Sunset at Etretat	1885	Pola Museum of Art, Hakone	81 x 100	W.1016
Etretat, Cliff and the Porte d'Aval	1885	Private collection	65 x 81	W.1017
The Cliffs of the Porte d'Aval	1885	Private collection	65 x 81	W.1018
The Cliff of Aval, Etrétat	1885	Israel Museum, Jerusalem	65 x 92	W.1019
Winter Scene at Etretat	1885	Private collection	65 x 81	W.1020
Fields at Etretat	1885	Private collection	65 x 81	W.1021
Countryside at Etretat	1885	Private collection		W.1022
Normandy cottage	1885	Kunsthaus Zürich	65 x 81	W.1023
Boats on the Beach at Etretat	1885	Art Institute of Chicago	65.5 x 81.3	W.1024
The Departure of the Boats, Etretat	1885	Art Institute of Chicago	73 x 92	W.1025
Fishing Boats	1885	Private collection	52 x 61	W.1026
Sailboat, Evening Effect	1885	Musée Marmottan Monet, Paris	54 x 65	W.1027
Fishing Boats in Etretat	1885	Seattle Art Museum	73 x 92	W.1028
Three Fishing Boats	1885	Museum of Fine Arts, Budapest	73 x 92	W.1029
Boats on the Pebbles	1885	Private collection	73 x 92	W.1030
Etretat, Boat on the Beach	1885	Private collection	50 x 61	W.1030a
Boats on the Beach	1885	Private collection		W.1031
Boats on the Beach	1885	Private collection		W.1031a
Sailboats off the Aiguille	1885	Private collection	65 x 81	W.1032
The Aiguille and the Porte d'Aval	1885	Private collection	65 x 81	W.1033
The Cliffs at Etretat	1885	Clark Art Institute, Williamstown	65 x 81	W.1034
The Manneport at High Tide	1885	Private collection	65 x 81	W.1035
Waves at the Manneport	1885	Private collection	73 x 92	W.1036
	1885	Philadelphia Museum of Art	65.5 x 81.3	W.1037
Étretat, the Manneporte, Reflection on Water	1885	Musée d'Orsay, Paris	65 x 81	W.1038
The Valley of Antifer	1885	Private collection	65 x 81	W.1039
The Needle of Étretat seen through the Porte d'Amont	1885	Private collection	73 x 60	W.1040
The Needle of Étretat seen through the Porte d'Amont	1885	Private collection		W.1041
The Rock Needle and the Porte d'Aval seen from the West	1886	Kreeger Museum, Washington D.C.	81 x 65	W.1042
The Rock Needle and the Porte d'Aval	1887	Art Gallery of Ontario, Toronto	81 x 39	W.1043
Etretat in the Rain	1885–86	National Gallery of Norway, Oslo	60.5 x 73.5	W.1044
Etretat, Cliff of Aval with the Porte and the Aiguille	1885	Private collection	56 x 82.5	W.1045
The Cliffs at Étretat	1886	Pushkin Museum, Moscow	66 x 81	W.1046
Étretat, the Porte d'Aval: Fishing Boats Leaving the Harbour	1885	Musée des Beaux-Arts de Dijon	60 x 81	W.1047
Cliff and Porte d'Amont in Rough Weather	1885–86	Private collection	65 x 81	W.1048
The Rock Needle Seen through the Porte d'Aval	1885–86	National Gallery of Canada, Ottawa	65 x 92	W.1049
The Rock Needle seen through the Porte d'Aval	1886	Private collection	73 x 92	W.1050
The Rock Needle and the Porte d'Aval	1886	Shimane Art Museum, Matsue	65 x 81	W.1051
The Manneporte near Étretat	1886	Metropolitan Museum of Art, New York	81.3 x 65.4	W.1052
The Manneporte	1886	Private collection	92 x 73	W.1053
Snow Effect at Falaise	1885–86	Private collection	66 x 81	W.1054
The Village of Giverny under the Snow	1886	Private collection	65 x 81	W.1055
Snow Effect at Limetz	1885–86	San Diego Museum of Art	65 x 81	W.1056
Winter at Giverny	1886	Private collection	60 x 81	W.1057
Flood at Giverny	1886	Private collection	65 x 81	W.1058
Willows, Giverny	1886	Gothenburg Museum of Art	73.6 x 93	W.1059
View of Vernon	1886	Private Collection	60 x 73	W.1060
Panorama of Vernon	1886	Private collection	60 x 81	W.1061
Springtime at Giverny	1886	Kreeger Museum, Washington D.C.	54 x 65	W.1062
Springtime in Giverny	1886	Private collection	65 x 54	W. 1063
Springtime in Giverny	1886	Private collection	60 x 73	W. 1064
An Orchard in Spring	1886	Private collection	65 x 81	W.1065
Springtime	1886	Fitzwilliam Museum, Cambridge	65 x 81	W.1066
Field of Tulips in Holland	1886	Musée d'Orsay, Paris	65.5 x 81.5	W.1067
Tulip Fields near The Hague	1886	Van Gogh Museum, Amsterdam	64.8 x 81.3	W.1068
Tulips in Holland	1886	Musée Marmottan Monet, Paris	54 x 81	W.1069
Tulip Fields at Sassenheim	1886	Clark Art Institute, Williamstown	59.7 x 73.2	W.1070
Field of Tulips near Leyden	1886	Private collection	60 x 73	W.1071
View of village of Giverny	1886	Private collection	65 x 81	W.1072
Haystack at Giverny	1886	Hermitage Museum, St Petersburg	61 x 81	W.1073
View of Giverny	1886	Tehran Museum of Contemporary Art	65 x 81	W.1074
Promenade (study)	1886	Private collection	102.5 x 75	W.1075
	1886	Musée d'Orsay, Paris	131 x 88	W.1076
Woman with a Parasol (also known as Study of a Figure Outdoors (Facing Left))	1886	Musée d'Orsay, Paris	131 x 88	W.1077
Self Portrait with a Beret	1886	Private collection	56 x 46	W.1078
Sunset at Giverny	1886	Private collection	65 x 81	W.1079
	1886	Private collection	81 x 92	W.1080
Meadow at Giverny	1886	Private collection	92 x 81	W.1081
Meadow in the Sun, at Giverny	1886	Private collection	92 x 81	W.1082
Meadow in the Sun, at Giverny	1886	Museum of Fine Arts, Boston	92 x 81	W.1083
Pyramids at Port-Coton	1886	Pushkin Museum, Moscow	65 x 81	W.1084
The "Pyramids" at Port-Coton	1886	Caracas Museum of Contemporary Art	65 x 81	W.1085
The Pyramides of Port Coton, Belle-Ile-en-Mer	1886	Ny Carlsberg Glyptotek, Copenhagen	60 x 73	W.1086
The Pyramids at Port-Coton	1886	Sammlung Rau fuer UNICEF, Arp Museum Bahnhof Rolandseck, Remagen	65.5 x 65.5	W.1087
The "Pyramids" of Port Coton, Sun Effect	1886	Private Collection	64 x 64	W.1088
Rocks at Belle-Ile	1886	Private collection	65 x 81	W.1089
Rocky Coast and the Lion Rock, Belle-Ile	1886	Des Moines Art Center	65.5 x 81	W.1090
Rocks at Port Coton, The Lion Rock	1886	Fitzwilliam Museum, Cambridge	65 x 81	W.1091
Port Coton, The Lion	1886	Private collection	60 x 73	W.1092
Entrance of Port-Goulphar, Belle-Ile	1886	Private collection	65 x 81	W.1093
Coming into Port-Goulphar, Belle-Ile	1886	Art Gallery of New South Wales, Sydney	81 x 65	W.1094
Belle-Ile, Rocks at Port-Goulphar	1886	Art Institute of Chicago	65 x 81	W.1095
Group of Rocks at Port-Goulphar	1886	Private collection	66 x 65	W.1096
Block of Rocks at Port-Goulphar	1886	Kasser Art Foundation, Montclair	65 x 81	W.1097
Belle-Ile, The Channel at Port-Goulphar	1886	Private collection	60 x 73	W.1098
Belle-Ile	1886	Private collection	60 x 74	W.1099
The Cote Sauvage	1886	Musée d'Orsay, Paris	65 x 81	W.1100
	1886	Private collection	81 x 65	W.1101
Rock Points at Belle-Ile	1886	Private collection	81 x 65	W.1102
Belle-Ile at Sunset	1886	Private collection	73 x 60	W.1103
Rocks at Belle-Ile, Port-Domois	1886	Cincinnati Art Museum	73 x 60	W.1104
The Village of Domois	1886	Private collection	63.5 x 81.5	W.1105
La Roche-Guibel, Port Domois	1886	Private collection	66 x 81	W.1106
Rocks at Belle-Ile	1886	Museum of Fine Arts, Reims	63 x 79	W.1107
Port Donnant, Belle Ile	1886	Yale University Art Gallery, New Haven	65 x 81	W.1108
Port Domois at Belle Ile	1886	Private collection	65 x 81	W.1109
Belle-Ile	1886	Musée Rodin, Paris	60 x 80	W.1110
The Rocks at Belle-Ile	1886	Private collection	60 x 81	W.1111
Belle-Ile, Rain Effect	1886	Artizon Museum, Tokyo	60 x 73	W.1112
Belle-Ile, the Roche Guibel	1886	Private collection	60 x 60	W.1113
The Grotto of Port-Domois	1886	Museum of Modern Art, Ibaraki	65 x 81	W.1114
Storm at Port-Goulphar, Belle-Ile	1886	Private collection	65 x 81	W.1115
Storm off the Belle-Ile Coast	1886	Musée d'Orsay, Paris	65 x 81	W.1116
Storm at Belle-Ile	1886	Private collection	60 x 73	W.1117
The Raging Sea	1886	National Museum of Fine Arts of Algiers	65 x 81	W.1118
Storm on the Cote de Belle-Ile	1886	Private collection	60 x 73	W.1119
Rain in Belle-Ile	1886	Private collection	60 x 60	W.1120
Rain in Belle-Ile	1886	Private collection	60 x 73	W.1121
Portrait of Poly, Fisherman at Kervillaouen	1886	Musée Marmottan Monet, Paris	74 x 53	W.1122
Landscape at Giverny	1887	Private collection	65 x 92	W.1123
Field at Giverny	1887	Private collection	65 x 92	W.1124
View of Bennecourt	1887	Columbus Museum of Art	81 x 81	W.1125
View of Bennecourt	1887	Private collection	81 x 81	W.1126
Jean-Pierre Hoschedé and Michel Monet on the Bank of the Epte	1887	National Gallery of Canada, Ottawa	76 x 96.5	W.1127
The Banks of the River Epte at Giverny	1887	Private collection	65 x 81	W.1128
The Banks of the Rive Epte	1887	Private collection	65 x 81	W.1129
White Frost at Giverny	1887	Private collection	65 x 81	W.1130
Foggy Road	1887	Private collection	60 x 73	W.1130a
In the Woods at Giverny: Blanche Hoschedé at her Easel with Suzanne Hoschedé Reading	1887	Los Angeles County Museum of Art	91.5 x 98	W.1131
In the Woods at Giverny: Blanche Hoschedé at her Easel with Suzanne Hoschedé Reading	1887	Private collection	97 x 130	W.1132
The Stroller (Suzanne Hoschede) (also known as Taking a Walk)	1887	Metropolitan Museum of Art, New York	100 x 70	W.1133
Fisherwoman with a Line on the Banks of the Epte	1887	Private collection	81 x 100	W.1134
Sunlight Effect under the Poplars	1887	Staatsgalerie Stuttgart	74.3 x 93	W.1135
Under the Poplars	1887	Private collection	73 x 92	W.1136
Field of Yellow Irises	1887	Musée Marmottan Monet, Paris	45 x 100	W.1137
Field of Irises at Giverny	1887	Private collection	45 x 100	W.1138
Field of Irises in the Morning	1887	Private collection	40 x 100	W.1139
Peony Garden	1887	National Museum of Western Art, Tokyo	65 x 100	W.1140
Peonies	1887	Musée d'Art et d'Histoire (Geneva)	73 x 100	W.1141
Peonies	1887	Private collection	73 x 100	W.1142
Bouquet of Peonies	1887	Private collection	81 x 65	W.1143
White Clematis	1887	Musée Marmottan Monet, Paris	92 x 52	W.1144
Clematis	1887	Private collection	65 x 100	W.1145
Lucerne and Poppies	1887	Private collection	73 x 92	W.1146
Poppies at Giverny	1887	Private collection	65 x 92	W.1147
Meadow at Limetz	1887	Private collection	65 x 81	W.1148
Blanche Monet Painting with her Sister Suzanne on the Bank of the River	1887	Private collection	39 x 50	W.1149
Two Women in a Rowing Boat	1887	Private collection	55 x 74	W.1150
In the "Norvegienne"	1887	Musée d'Orsay, Paris	98 x 131	W.1151
Young Girls in a Row Boat	1887	National Museum of Western Art, Tokyo	145 x 132	W.1152
The Blue Row Boat	1887	Thyssen-Bornemisza Museum, Madrid	109 x 129	W.1153
The Row Boat	1887	Musée Marmottan Monet, Paris	146 x 133	W.1154
Poplars at Giverny	1887	Private collection	73 x 92	W.1155
Poplars at Giverny, Sunrise	1887	Museum of Modern Art, New York	73 x 92	W.1156
Three Trees at Giverny	1887	Private collection	73 x 92	W.1157

== Works 1888 (Antibes) ==
Image Title	Year	Location	Dimensions (cm.)	Cat. no. Medium
Antibes, Afternoon Effect	1888	Museum of Fine Arts, Boston	65 x 81	W.1158
The Old Fort at Antibes (also known as The Fort of Antibes)	1888	Private collection	60 x 81	W.1159
Antibes	1888	Pérez Simón Collection	65 x 81	W.1160
The Bay of Antibes	1888	Private collection	65 x 81	W.1161
Antibes, The Fort	1888	Private collection	60 x 81	W.1161a
Antibes and the Maritime Alps	1888	Private collection	60 x 73	W.1162
The Castle in Antibes	1888	Museum of Fine Arts, Boston	81 x 116	W.1163
The Castle in Antibes	1888	Museum of Fine Arts, Boston	60 x 81	W.1163a
Antibes Seen from the Salis Gardens	1888	Private collection	73 x 92	W.1164
Gardener's House at Antibes	1888	Cleveland Museum of Art	65 x 92	W.1165
The Gardener's House	1888	Private collection	65 x 92	W.1166
Antibes. View from the Salis Gardens	1888	Private collection	65 x 92	W.1167
Antibes from La Salis	1888	Toledo Museum of Art	73 x 92	W.1168
Antibes seen from La Salis	1888	Private collection	65 x 92	W.1169
Antibes in the Morning	1888	Philadelphia Museum of Art	65 x 81	W.1170
View of Antibes from the Plateau Notre-Dame	1888	Private collection	65 x 92	W.1171
Antibes Seen from Plateau Notre Dame	1888	Museum of Fine Arts, Boston	65 x 81	W.1172
The Gulf of Antibes	1888	Private collection	65 x 92	W.1173
Antibes Seen from the Cape, Mistral Wind	1888	Private collection	65 x 81	W.1174
View from the Cap d'Antibes	1888	Hill-Stead Museum, Farmington	63.5 x 78.7	W.1175
At Cap d'Antibes, Mistral Wind	1888	Museum of Fine Arts, Boston	65 x 81	W.1176
The Alps Seen from Cap d'Antibes	1888	Private collection	65 x 81	W.1177
The Bay des Anges Seen from Cap d'Antibes	1888	Private collection	65 x 81	W.1178
The Sea and the Alps (also known as The Mediterranean at Antibes)	1888	Private collection	59 x 84	W.1179
The Gulf Juan at Antibes	1888	Private collection	65 x 92	W.1180
The Mediterranean during the Mistral	1888	Private collection	65 x 92	W.1181
The "Big Blue" at Antibes (also known as The Sea at Antibes)	1888	Kunstmuseum Basel	60 x 73	W.1182
The Sea in Antibes	1888	Von der Heydt Museum, Wuppertal	65 x 81	W.1183
The Mediterranean at Antibes	1888	Private collection	60 x 73	W.1184
At Cap d'Antibes	1888	Columbus Museum of Art	65 x 81	W.1185
Edge of the Mediterranean, Grey Weather	1888	Private collection	73 x 92	W.1186
Beach in Juan-les-Pins	1888	Private collection	73 x 92	W.1187
Trees by the Seashore at Antibes	1888	Private collection	73 x 92	W.1188
Juan-les-Pins	1888	Private collection	73 x 92	W.1189
Pine Trees, Cap d'Antibes	1888	Private collection	73 x 92	W.1190
Under the Pine Trees, Evening	1888	Philadelphia Museum of Art	73 x 92	W.1191
Antibes	1888	Courtauld Institute of Art, London	65 x 92	W.1192
The Esterel Mountains	1888	Private collection	65 x 92	W.1193

== Works 1888–1898 (Giverny (continued)) ==
Image Title	Year	Location	Dimensions (cm.)	Cat. no. Medium
The Meadow at Giverny	1888	Private collection	73 x 92	W.1194
Morning in the Fog	1888	Private collection		W.1195
Morning Fog	1888	National Gallery of Art, Washington D.C.	73 x 92	W.1196
Fog at Giverny	1888	Private collection	73 x 92	W.1197
Meadow at Limetz	1888	Private collection	65 x 92	W.1198
The Meadow at Giverny	1888	Kreeger Museum, Washington D.C.	65 x 92	W.1199
Meadow at Giverny, Morning effect	1888	Private collection	50 x 81	W.1200
Meadow at Limetz	1888	Private collection	73 x 92	W.1201
Meadows at Giverny	1888	Hermitage Museum, St Petersburg	92 x 81	W.1202
Taking a Walk in Grey Weather	1888	Private collection	92 x 81	W.1203
Landscape with figures, Giverny, figures in sunshine	1888	Art Institute of Chicago	80 x 80	W.1204
Morning Landscape, Giverny (also known as Landscape in the Morning)	1888	Private collection	74 x 80	W.1205
Evening in the meadow at Giverny	1888	Private collection	82 x 81	W.1206
Young Girl in the Garden at Giverny	1888	Private collection	73 x 92	W.1207
Poplars at Giverny	1888	Private collection	65 x 92	W.1208
Bend in the River Epte	1888	Philadelphia Museum of Art	73 x 92	W.1209
Mill at Limetz	1888	Nelson-Atkins Museum of Art, Kansas City	92 x 73	W.1210
Mill at Limetz	1888	Private collection	90 x 72	W.1210a
The Seine near Giverny	1888	Private collection	65 x 92	W.1211
Two Vases of Chrysanthemums	1888	Private collection	73 x 92	W.1212
Grainstacks at Giverny, Sunset	1888–89	Museum of Modern Art, Saitama	65 x 92	W.1213
Grainstacks at Giverny, Morning Effect	1888–89	Private collection	65 x 92	W.1214
Grainstacks, White Frost, Sunrise	1888–89	Hill-Stead Museum, Farmington	65 x 92	W.1215
Grainstack at Giverny	1889	Tel Aviv Museum of Art	65 x 81	W.1216
Grainstacks, Winter, Foggy Weather	1888–89	Private collection	65 x 92	W.1217
Valley of the Creuse at Fresselines	1889	Private collection	81 x 65	W.1218
Valley of the Creuse (Sunlight Effect)	1889	Museum of Fine Arts, Boston	65 x 92	W.1219
Ravine of the Creuse at the end of the Day	1889	Museum of Fine Arts, Reims	65 x 81	W.1220
Valley of the Creuse (Gray Day)	1889	Museum of Fine Arts, Boston	65 x 81	W.1221
Confluence of the Two Creuses	1889	Private collection	65 x 81	W.1222
Valley of the Creuse, Sunset	1889	Private collection	67 x 82	W.1222a
Valley of the Creuse, Afternoon Sunlight	1889	Private collection	73 x 92	W.1223
Valley of the Creuse	1889	Von der Heydt Museum, Wuppertal	73 x 92	W.1224
Valley of the Creuse, Evening Effect	1889	Musée Marmottan Monet, Paris	65 x 81	W.1225
Valley of the Creuse, Sunset	1889	Unterlinden Museum, Colmar	73 x 70	W.1226
	1889	Private collection	73 x 73	W.1227
Study of Rocks; Creuse (also known as Le Bloc)	1889	Formerly collection of Queen Elizabeth The Queen Mother	73 x 92	W.1228
The Old Tree at Fresselines	1889	Private collection	81 x 100	W.1229
Valley of the Petite Creuse	1889	Museum of Fine Arts, Boston	65 x 92	W.1230
The Old Tree at the Confluence	1889	Art Institute of Chicago	65 x 92	W.1231
Ravine of the Petit Creuse	1889	Museum of Fine Arts, Boston	73 x 92	W.1232
	1889	Philadelphia Museum of Art	73 x 92	W.1233
The Bridge at Vervy	1889	Musée Marmottan Monet, Paris	65 x 92	W.1234
The Mill at Vervy	1889	Private collection	73 x 92	W.1235
The Mill at Vervy	1889	Private collection	65 x 81	W.1236
The Village of La Roche-Blond, Sunset	1889	Mie Prefectural Art Museum, Tsu	73 x 92	W.1237
The Village of La Coche-Blond, Evening	1889	Mie Prefectural Art Museum, Tsu	73 x 92	W.1238
Rapids on the Petite Creuse at Fresselines	1889	Metropolitan Museum of Art, New York	65 x 922	W.1239
Torrent of the Creuse	1889	Private collection	65 x 92	W.1240
The Willows at Giverny	1889	Private collection	73 x 92	W.1241
Willows at Sunset	1889	Private collection	73 x 92	W.1242
Giverny in Springtime	1890	Clark Art Institute, Williamstown	65 x 81	W.1243
The Poplars	1890	Private collection	65 x 81	W.1244
Effect of Spring at Giverny	1890	Private collection	60 x 100	W.1245
Meadow, Cloudy Sky	1890	Destroyed in a fire, 2022	60 x 100	W.1246
Meadow at Giverny	1890	Fukushima Prefectural Museum of Art	65 x 92	W.1247
Meadow in flower at Giverny	1890	Private collection	65 x 92	W.1248
The Pink Skiff	1890	Private collection	135 x 175	W.1249
Boating on the River Epte	1890	São Paulo Museum of Art	133 x 145	W.1250
Poppy Field	1890	Smith College Museum of Art, Northampton	60 x 100	W.1251
Field of Poppies near Giverny	1890	Museum of Fine Arts, Boston	60 x 100	W.1252
Poppy Field, Giverny	1890	Art Institute of Chicago	61 x 96.5	W.1253
Poppies	1890	Private collection	60 x 100	W.1254
Poppy Field	1890	Hermitage Museum, St Petersburg	60 x 92	W.1255
Oat and Poppy Field	1890	Private collection	65 x 92	W.1256
Field of Oats and Poppies	1890	Private collection	73 x 92	W.1257
Oat and Poppy Field	1890	Strasbourg Museum of Modern and Contemporary Art	65 x 92	W.1258
Oat Field with Poppies	1890	Private collection	65 x 92	W.1259
Oat Field with Poppies	1890	Harn Museum of Art University of Florida	50.8 x 76.2	W.1260
Portrait of Suzanne with Sunflowers	1890	Private collection	162 x 107	W.1261
The Islets at Port-Villez	1890	Private collection	60 x 100	W.1262
The Seine at Port-Villez	1890	Musée d'Orsay, Paris	65 x 92	W.1263
The Gust of Wind	1890	Columbus Museum of Art	60 x 100	W.1264
The Sand Islets at Port Villez	1890	Private collection	65 x 81	W.1265
Grainstacks at the End of Summer, Morning Effect	1890	Musée d'Orsay, Paris	60 x 100	W.1266
Grainstacks in Bright Sunlight	1890	Hill-Stead Museum, Farmington	60 x 100	W.1267
Grainstacks in the Sunlight, Morning Effect	1890	Private collection	65 x 100	W.1268
Grainstacks at the End of Summer, Evening Effect	1890	Art Institute of Chicago	60 x 100	W.1269
Two Grainstacks at the End of the Day, Autumn	1890	Art Institute of Chicago	65 x 100	W.1270
Grainstacks in the Sunlight, Midday	1890–91	National Gallery of Australia, Canberra	65 x 100	W.1271
Grainstacks, Last Rays of the Sun	1890	Private collection	73 x 92	W.1272
Grainstacks	1890	Private collection	73 x 92	W.1273
Grainstacks, Snow Effect	1891	Shelburne Museum	60 x 100	W.1274
Grainstacks, Winter	1891	Private collection	65 x 100	W.1275
Grainstacks in the Morning, Snow Effect	1891	J. Paul Getty Museum, Los Angeles	65 x 100	W.1276
Haystacks, Snow Effect	1890–91	National Galleries of Scotland, Edinburgh	65 x 92	W.1277
Grainstacks at Sunset, Snow Effect	1890–91	Art Institute of Chicago	65 x 100	W.1278
Grainstacks, Effect of Snow and Sun	1890–91	Metropolitan Museum of Art, New York	65 x 92	W.1279
Grainstack in the Morning, Snow Effect	1890–91	Museum of Fine Arts, Boston	65 x 92	W.1280
Grainstack in Overcast Weather, Snow Effect	1890–91	Art Institute of Chicago	65 x 92	W.1281
Grainstack at Sunset, Winter	1890–91	Private collection	65 x 92	W.1282
Grainstack	1890–91	Art Institute of Chicago	65 x 92	W.1283
Grainstack, Thaw, Sunset	1890–91	Art Institute of Chicago	65 x 92	W.1284
Grainstack	1891	Private collection	65 x 92	W.1285
Grainstack, Sun in the Mist	1891	Minneapolis Institute of Art	65 x 100	W.1286
Grainstack in the Sunlight, Snow Effect	1891	Private collection	65 x 92	W.1287
Grainstack in Sunshine	1891	Kunsthaus Zürich	60 x 100	W.1288
Grainstack at Sunset	1891	Museum of Fine Arts, Boston	73 x 92	W.1289
Grainstack in the Sunshine	1891	Private collection	73 x 92	W.1290
Poplars on the Banks of the River Epte, Overcast Weather	1891	MOA Museum of Art, Atami	92 x 73	W.1291
Poplars on the Banks of the River Epte, Evening Effect	1891	Private collection	100 x 65	W.1292
Row of poplars in autumn	1891	Private collection	100 x 65	W.1293
Poplars on the Banks of the River Epte, Effect of Sunset	1891	Private collection	100 x 65	W.1294
Poplars at Sunset	1891	Private collection	102 x 62	W.1295
Poplars on the Banks of the River Epte at dusk	1891	Museum of Fine Arts, Boston	100 x 65	W.1296
Poplars on the Banks of the River Epte in Autumn	1891	Private collection	100 x 65	W.1297
Poplars on the Banks of the Epte	1891	Philadelphia Museum of Art	100 x 65	W.1298
Poplars on the Bank of the Epte, Overcast	1891	Private collection	91.5 x 81.5	W.1299
Poplars on the Epte	1891	Tate Britain, London	92 x 73	W.1300
Poplars	1891	Private collection	116 x 73	W.1301
Poplars, Wind Effect	1891	Private collection	100 x 73	W.1302
Three Trees in Grey Weather	1891	Private collection	92 x 73	W.1303
Three Trees in Spring	1891	Private collection	92 x 73	W.1304
Three Trees in Summer	1891	National Museum of Western Art, Tokyo	92 x 73	W.1305
Three Trees in Autumn	1891	Private collection	92 x 73	W.1306
Three Poplar Trees, Autumn Effect	1891	Philadelphia Museum of Art	92 x 73	W.1307
Three Poplar Trees in the Autumn	1891	Private collection	92 x 73	W.1308
Four Trees	1891	Metropolitan Museum of Art, New York	82 x 81.5	W.1309
Poplars on the Banks of the River Epte	1891	National Galleries of Scotland, Edinburgh	81.5 x 82	W.1310
The Poplars, Autumn	1891	Private collection	80 x 92	W.1311
Poplars on the Banks of the River Epte, Seen from the Marsh	1891–92	Private collection	88 x 93	W.1312
Poplars, View from the Marsh	1891–92	Fitzwilliam Museum, Cambridge	90 x 93	W.1313
	1892	Private collection	65 x 100	W.1314
General view of Rouen	1892	Musée des Beaux-Arts de Rouen	65 x 100	W.1315
General view of Rouen	1892	Private collection	65 x 100	W.1315a
La Rue d'Epicerie at Rouen	1892	Private collection	92 x 52	W.1316
The Cour d'Albane	1892	Smith College Museum of Art, Northampton	92 x 73	W.1317
The Cour d'Albane, Grey Weather	1892	Private collection	92 x 65	W.1318
The Portal, Harmony in Brown	1892	Musée d'Orsay, Paris	107 x 73	W.1319
	1892	Private collection	94 x 73	W.1320
Rouen Cathedral, the Portal, Grey Weather	1894	Musée d'Orsay, Paris	100 x 65	W.1321
The Portal in the Sun	1894	Private collection	100 x 65	W.1322
Rouen Cathedral, Symphony in Grey and Rose	1894	National Museum Cardiff	100 x 65	W.1323
Rouen Cathedral, West Facade, Sunlight	1894	National Gallery of Art, Washington D.C.	100 x 65	W.1324
Rouen Cathedral, Portal, Sunlight	1894	Metropolitan Museum of Art, New York	100 x 65	W.1325
Rouen Cathedral at the End of the Day	1894	Pushkin Museum, Moscow	100 x 65	W.1326
Rouen Cathedral Portal, Sunlight, at the End of the Day	1894	Musée Marmottan Monet, Paris	100 x 65	W.1327
Rouen Cathedral, Portal	1894	Pola Museum of Art, Hakone	100 x 65	W.1328
Rouen Cathedral	1894	National Museum of Serbia, Belgrade	100 x 65	W.1329
Blanche Hoschedé painting	1892	Private collection	73 x 92	W.1330
Effect of Snow at Giverny	1893	Private collection		W.1331
Church at Jeufosse, Snowy Weather	1893	Private collection	65 x 92	W.1332
The Seine at Bennecourt in Winter	1893	Private collection	60 x 100	W.1333
Floating Ice at Bennecourt	1893	Private collection	60 x 100	W.1334
Ice Floes at Bennecourt	1893	Metropolitan Museum of Art, New York	65 x 100	W.1335
Floating Ice near Bennecourt	1893	Private collection	65 x 100	W.1336
Ice Floes, White Effect (near Bennecourt)	1893	Private collection	65 x 100	W.1337
Morning Haze	1893	Philadelphia Museum of Art	65 x 100	W.1338
Floating Ice near Bennecourt	1893	Private collection	40.5 x 54	W.1338a
Break-up, The Seine near Bennecourt	1893	Private collection	65 x 100	W.1339
Ice breaking-up near Bennecourt	1893	Walker Art Gallery, Liverpool	65 x 100	W.1340
Ice Floes on the Seine at Port-Villez	1893	Private collection	73 x 92	W.1341
Ice floes, Lock of Port-Villez	1893	Private collection	73 x 92	W.1342
Ice Floating	1893	Private collection	60 x 100	W.1343
Ice floes, Evening Effect	1893	Museum Langmatt, Baden	60 x 100	W.1344
The Portal and the Tour d'Albene, Grey Weather	1893	Musée des Beaux-Arts de Rouen	100 x 73	W.1345
The Portal and the Tour d'Albane	1893	Musée d'Orsay, Paris	106 x 73	W.1346
Rouen Cathedral, the Portal, Morning Effect	1893	Beyeler Foundation, Riehen	110 x 73	W.1347
Rouen Cathedral, the Portal and the tour d'Albane, Morning Effect	1893	Museum of Fine Arts, Boston	106 x 74	W.1348
Rouen Cathedral in the Fog	1893	Private collection	106 x 73	W.1349
Rouen Cathedral, the Portal and the Tour d'Albane, Full Sunlight	1893	Pushkin Museum, Moscow	100 x 65	W.1350
The Portal of Rouen Cathedral at Midday	1893	National Gallery of Art, Washington D.C.	100 x 65	W.1351
Rouen Cathedral, the Portal, Morning Fog	1893	Museum Folkwang, Essen	100 x 65	W.1352
Rouen Cathedral, Portal, Morning Fog	1893	Private collection	100 x 65	W.1353
Rouen Cathedral, Portal, Morning Light	1893	J. Paul Getty Museum, Los Angeles	100 x 65	W.1354
Rouen Cathedral, the Portal in the Sun	1894	Musée d'Orsay, Paris	91 x 63	W.1355
Rouen Cathedral, Façade	1893	Museum of Fine Arts, Boston	100 x 65	W.1356
Rouen Cathedral, Portal	1893	Schloss Weimar	100 x 65	W.1357
Rouen Cathedral, the Façade in Sunlight	1893	Clark Art Institute, Williamstown	106 x 73	W.1358
Rouen Cathedral, Portal	1893	Private collection	92 x 65	W.1359
Rouen Cathedral, Portal and Tower Saint-Romain in the Sun	1893	Musée d'Orsay, Paris	107 x 73	W.1360
Rouen Cathedral	1893	Private collection	106 x 73	W.1361
Haystacks at Giverny	1893	Private collection	65 x 100	W.1362
Haystacks	1893	Private collection	60 x 81	W.1363
Haystack	1893	Museum of Fine Arts, Springfield	65 x 100	W.1364
Morning on the Seine at Giverny	1893	Private collection	73 x 92	W.1365
Springtime Landscape	1894	Larock Granoff, Paris	92 x 73	W.1366
Springtime Landscape at Giverny	1894	Private collection	92 x 65	W.1367
A Meadow at Giverny	1894	Princeton University Art Museum	92 x 73	W.1368
A Meadow at Giverny	1894	Private collection	92 x 73	W.1369
The Seine at Port-Villez	1884	Musée des Beaux-Arts de Rouen	65 x 100	W.1370
The Seine at Port-Villez, Pink Effect	1894	Kreeger Museum, Washington D.C.	65 x 100	W.1371
The Seine at Port-Villez, Mist	1884	Private collection	65 x 100	W.1372
The Seine at Port-Villez, Harmony in Blue	1894	Tate Gallery, London	65 x 100	W.1373
	1894	Private collection	65 x 100	W.1374
The Seine at Port-Villez	1894	Private collection	50 x 82	W.1374a
The Seine at Port-Villez, Clear Weather	1894	Private collection	60 x 81	W.1375
The Seine near Vernon at Port Villez	1894	Private collection	65 x 100	W.1376
The Seine at Port-Villez	1894	Private collection	65 x 92	W.1377
The Seine near Giverny	1894	Uehara Museum of Modern Art	54 x 81	W.1378
The Seine at Port-Villez, Evening Effect	1894	Musée Marmottan Monet, Paris	52 x 92	W.1379
	1894	Musée Marmottan Monet, Paris	52 x 92	W.1380
The Seine near Vernon	1894	Private collection	50 x 81	W.1381
The Seine in the Mist	1894	Private collection	50 x 81	W.1382
The Small Haystacks of Giverny	1894	Private collection	65 x 100	W.1383
The Small Haystacks of Giverny, Sun Effect	1894	Israel Museum, Jerusalem	65 x 100	W.1384
The Small Haystacks	1894	Private collection	65 x 100	W.1385
Vernon in the Sun	1894	Brooklyn Museum, New York	65 x 92	W.1386
Vernon Church in the Sun	1894	Private collection	65 x 92	W.1387
Vernon Church in Grey Weather	1894	Private collection	65 x 92	W.1388
Vernon Church	1894	Private collection	65 x 92	W.1389
Vernon Church in the Fog	1894	Shelburne Museum	65 x 92	W.1390
Church of Vernon in the Mist	1894	Rosengart Collection Museum	65 x 92	W.1391
The Tree by the Seine at Vernon	1895	Private collection	49 x 65	W.1391a
The Water-Lily Pond in Winter	1895	Private collection	81 x 92	w.1392
Red Houses at Bjornegaard in the Snow, Norway	1895	Musée Marmottan Monet, Paris	65 x 81	W.1393
Houses in the Snow, Norway	1895	Private collection	65 x 92	W.1394
Houses in the Snow, Norway	1895	Sammlung Rau fuer UNICEF, Arp Museum Bahnhof Rolandseck, Remagen	61 x 84	W.1395
Norwegian Landscape, Blue Houses	1895	Private collection	61 x 84	W.1396
Sandviken Village in the Snow	1895	Art Institute of Chicago	73 x 92	W.1397
Sandviken, Norway	1895	Private collection	73 x 92	W.1398
Sandviken Village	1895	Art Museum Riga Bourse	37 x 52	W.1398a
Sandviken Village, Snow Effect	1895	Private collection	37 x 54	W.1398b
Sandviken, Norway	1895	Private collection	50 x 61	W.1398c
Norwegian Landscape, Sandviken	1895	Private collection	73 x 92	W.1399
The Fjord, near Christiania	1895	Private collection	65 x 100	W.1400
The Fjord, near Christiania	1895	Private collection	65 x 100	W.1401
On the Bank of Christiania Fjord	1895	Private collection	65 x 92	W.1402
On the Bank of Christiania Fjord	1895	Private collection	65 x 100	W.1403
Houses in the Snow and Mount Kolsaas	1895	Uehara Museum of Modern Art	65 x 92	W.1404
Houses in the Snow	1895	Private collection	65 x 92	W.1405
Mount Kolsaas, Norway	1895	Musée Marmottan Monet, Paris	65 x 100	W.1406
Mount Kolsaas	1895	Musée Marmottan Monet, Paris	65 x 92	W.1407
Mount Kolsaas	1895	Private collection	65 x 100	W.1408
Mount Kolsaas, Sun Effect	1895	Private collection	65 x 100	W.1409
Mount Kolsaas in Clear Weather	1895	Private collection	65 x 100	W.1410
Mount Kolsaas in Misty Weather	1895	Private collection	65 x 100	W.1411
Mount Kolsaas, Evening Effect	1895	Private collection	65 x 100	W.1412
Mount Kolsaas in Somber Weather	1895	Private collection	65 x 100	W.1413
Mount Kolsaas at Dusk	1895	Private collection	65 x 92	W.1414
Mount Kolsaas, Rose Reflection	1895	Musée d'Orsay, Paris	65 x 100	W.1415
Mount Kolsaas, Rose Effect	1895	Private collection	65 x 92	W.1416
Mount Kolsaas, Snowstorm	1895	Private collection	65 x 100	W.1417
Mount Kolsaas, Norway	1895	Private collection	65 x 100	W.1418
The Bridge in Monet's Garden	1895–96	Philadelphia Museum of Art	98 x 117	W.1419
The Bridge in Monet's Garden	1895	Private collection	89 x 92	W.1919a
Garden at Giverny	1895	Foundation E.G. Bührle, Zürich	81 x 92	W.1420
Cliff at Pourville	1896	Private collection	65 x 100	W.1421
Cliff at Pourville	1896	Private collection	65 x 92	W.1422
Cliff at Pourville, Bad Weather	1896	Private collection	65 x 100	W.1423
Stormy Weather at Pourville	1896	Private collection	65 x 92	W.1424
Cliff at Pourville, Sunset	1896	Musée Alphonse-Georges-Poulain	60 x 81	W.1425
Cliffs at Pourville, Rain	1896	Private collection	65 x 100	W.1426
The Hut on the Cliff at Varengeville	1896	Ny Carlsberg Glyptotek, Copenhagen	65 x 92	W.1427
On the Cliff at Petit Ailly	1896	Private collection	73 x 92	W.1428
Cliff at Petit Ailly, at Varengeville	1896	Private collection	65 x 92	W.1429
	1896	Musée Massena, Nice	65 x 100	W.1430
Cliffs to the East of Pourville	1896	Private collection	65 x 92	W.1431
At val Saint Nicolas near Dieppe	1896	Private collection	65 x 100	W.1432
A Cliff near Dieppe	1896	Private collection	65 x 92	W.1433
At val Saint Nicolas near Dieppe	1896	Private collection	65 x 100	W.1434
Arm of the Seine near Giverny	1896	Museum of Fine Arts, Boston	73 x 92	W.1435
Morning on the Seine	1896	Private collection	89 x 92	W.1436
Morning on the Seine	1896	Private collection	92 x 92	W.1436a
Morning on the Seine	1896	Private collection	73 x 92	W.1437
Flood at Giverny	1896–97	Ny Carlsberg Glyptotek, Copenhagen	73 x 92	W.1438
	1896	Private collection	65 x 92	W.1438a
Flood Waters	1896	National Gallery, London	73 x 92	W.1439
Cliffs at Pourville, Sunrise	1897	Private collection	65 x 100	W.1440
	1897	Private collection	65 x 100	W.1441
Cliffs at Pourville, Morning	1897	Montreal Museum of Fine Arts	65 x 100	W.1442
Cliffs at Pourville, Rough Sea	1897	Private collection	65 x 100	W.1443
Heavy Sea at Pourville	1897	National Museum of Western Art, Tokyo	73 x 100	W.1444
The Pointe du Petit Ailly	1897	Nahmad Collection	73 x 92	W.1445
Pointe du Petit Ailly, Varengeville	1897	Private collection	73 x 92	W.1446
The Pointe du Petit Ailly in Gray Weather	1897	Kreeger Museum, Washington D.C.	73 x 92	W.1447
The Coastguard Cabin	1897	Private collection	65 x 92	W.1448
Customs House at Varengeville	1897	Private collection	65 x 92	W.1449
Petit-Ailly, Varengeville, Full Sun	1897	Museum of modern art André Malraux - MuMa	65 x 92	W.1450
The Coastguard Cabin at Varengeville	1897	Metropolitan Museum of Art, New York	65 x 81	W.1451
The Gorge at Varengeville, Late Afternoon	1897	Harvard University Art Museums, Cambridge	65 x 92	W.1452
The Gorge du Petit Ailly, Varengeville, Grey Weather	1897	Private collection	65 x 92	W.1453
Customs House, Varengeville	1897	Private collection	65 x 92	W.1454
Customs House at Varengeville	1897	Art Institute of Chicago	65 x 92	W.1455
Coastguard Cabin	1897	San Diego Museum of Art	61.5 x 89.5	W.1456
Customs House, Rose Effect	1897	Private collection	65 x 92	W.1457
	1897	Legion of Honor, San Francisco	65 x 92	W.1458
The Cliff near Dieppe	1897	Private collection	65 x 100	W.1459
On the Cliffs near Dieppe	1897	Private collection	65 x 100	W.1461
The Cliff at Dieppe	1897	Private collection	65 x 100	W.1462
On the Cliff near Dieppe	1897	Private collection	65 x 100	W.1463
On the Cliff near Dieppe, Sunset	1897	Private collection	65 x 100	W.1464
On the Cliff near Dieppe	1897	Private collection	65 x 92	W.1464a
At Val Saint-Nicolas near Dieppe, Morning	1897	Private collection	65 x 100	W.1465
At Val Saint-Nicolas near Dieppe, Morning	1897	The Phillips Collection, Washington D.C.	65 x 100	W.1466
Steep Cliff near Dieppe	1897	Hermitage Museum, St Petersburg	65 x 100	W.1467
On the Cliff near Dieppe, Overcast Skies	1897	Private collection	65 x 100	W.1468
Near Dieppe, Reflections on the Sea	1867	Private collection	65 x 92	W.1469
On the Cliff near Dieppe	1897	Private collection	65 x 92	W.1470
Cliff near Dieppe	1897	Private collection	65 x 100	W.1471
Morning on the Seine	1897	Private collection	73 x 92	W.1472
Morning on the Seine, Effect of Mist	1897	North Carolina Museum of Art, Raleigh	65 x 92	W.1473
Arm of the Seine near Giverny in the Fog	1897	North Carolina Museum of Art, Raleigh	89 x 92	W.1474
Morning on the Seine	1897	Art Institute of Chicago	87.6 x 89.5	W.1475
Arm of the Seine near Giverny in the Fog	1897	Kreeger Museum, Washington D.C.	89 x 92	W.1476
Morning on the Seine	1897	Mead Art Museum, Amherst	81 x 92	W.1477
Arm of the Seine near Giverny at Sunrise	1897	Musée Marmottan Monet, Paris	89 x 92	W.1478
Arm of the Seine at Giverny at Dawn	1897	Hiroshima Museum of Art	81 x 92	W.1479
Morning on the Seine, Clear Weather	1897	Private collection	81 x 82	W.1480
Morning on the Seine near Giverny	1897	Museum of Fine Arts, Boston	81 x 92	W.1481
Morning on the Seine near Giverny	1896	Metropolitan Museum of Art, New York	81 x 92	W.1482
Morning on the Seine, near Giverny	1897	Private collection	73 x 92	W.1483
Morning on the Seine	1897	Private collection	89 x 92	W.1484
Morning on the Seine	1897	White House Historical Association, Washington D.C.	89 x 92	W.1485
Morning on the Seine	1897	Private collection	89 x 92	W.1486
Arm of the Seine near Giverny	1897	Musée d'Orsay, Paris	75 x 92.5	W.1487
Morning on the Seine	1897	Private collection	72 x 89.5	W.1488
L'île aux Orties, Giverny	1897	Private collection	71 x 89	W.1489
L'île aux Orties, Giverny	1897	Private collection	73 x 92	W.1490
L'île aux Orties, Near Vernon	1897	Metropolitan Museum of Art, New York	73 x 92	W.1491
Banks of the Seine, Morning	1897	Private collection	73 x 92	W.1492
The Islets at Port-Villez	1897	Brooklyn Museum, New York	81 x 100	W.1493
The Seine at Giverny	1897	National Gallery of Art, Washington D.C.	81 x 100	W.1494
Chrysanthemums	1897	Private collection	79 x 119	W.1495
Chrysanthemums	1897	Basel Kunstmuseum	81 x 100	W.1496
Chrysanthemums	1897	Private collection	130 x 89	W.1497
Bed of Chrysanthemums	1897	Private collection	130 x 89	W.1498
Morning on the Seine in the Rain	1897–98	National Museum of Western Art, Tokyo	73 x 92	W.1499
Willows	1897	National Museum of Western Art, Tokyo	71 x 89.5	W.1500
For Water-Lily paintings W.1501 to W.1520, see Water Lilies (Monet series).

== Works 1899–1904 (London) ==
For Monet's Water Lilies see Water Lilies (Monet series)

Image Title	Year	Location	Dimensions (cm.)	Cat. no. Medium
Charing Cross Bridge	1899–1901	Shelburne Museum Vermont House	65 x 92	W.1521
Charing Cross Bridge	1899–1901	Santa Barbara Museum of Art	65 x 81	W.1522
Charing Cross Bridge	1899–1901	Murauchi Art Museum, Hachioji	65 x 92	W.1523
Charing Cross Bridge	1899–1901	Menard Art Museum, Komaki	65 x 81	W.1524
Charing Cross Bridge	1899–1901	National Museum of Western Art, Tokyo	65 x 100	W.1525
Charing Cross Bridge, Overcast Day	1899–1901	Museum of Fine Arts, Boston	60 x 92	W.1526
Charing Cross Bridge	1899–1901	Art Institute of Chicago	65 x 92	W.1527
Charing Cross Bridge	1899–1901	Private collection	65 x 81	W.1528
Charing Cross Bridge	1899–1901	National Museum Cardiff	65 x 81	W.1529
Charing Cross Bridge	1899–1901	Indianapolis Museum of Art	66 x 91	W.1530
Charing Cross Bridge	1899	Thyssen-Bornemisza Museum, Madrid	65 x 81	W.1531
Charing Cross Bridge, Reflections on the Thames	1899–1901	Baltimore Museum of Art	65 x 100	W.1532
Charing Cross Bridge, Trains Crossing	1899–1901	Private collection	65 x 92	W.1533
Charing Cross Bridge, Smoke in Fog	1899–1901	Private collection	73 x 92	W.1534
Charing Cross Bridge, Smoke in Fog	1899–1901	Musée Marmottan Monet, Paris	73 x 92	W.1535
Charing Cross Bridge, The Thames	1899–1901	Yamagata Museum of Art	73 x 100	W.1536
Charing Cross Bridge, The Thames	1899–1901	Museum of Fine Arts of Lyon	73 x 100	W.1537
Charing Cross Bridge, Train Passing	1899–1901	Private collection	73 x 92	W.1538
Charing Cross Bridge, Evening Effect	1899-1901	Private collection	73 x 100	W. 1539
Charing Cross Bridge	1899–1901	Private collection	65 x 92	W.1540
Charing Cross Bridge, Fog	1899–1901	Art Gallery of Ontario, Toronto	73 x 92	W.1541
Charing Cross Bridge	1899–1901	Private collection	65 x 81	W.1542
Cleopatra's Needle and Charing Cross Bridge	1899–1901	Mohamed Mahmoud Khalil Museum, Cairo	73 x 100	W.1543
Cleopatra's Needle and Charing Cross Bridge	1899–1901	Private collection	65 x 81	W.1544
Charing Cross Bridge	1899–1901	Private collection	65 x 95	W. 1545
Charing Cross Bridge	1899–1901	Private collection	65 x 100	W. 1546
Charing Cross Bridge	1899–1901	Private collection	65 x 100	W.1547
Charing Cross Bridge	1899–1901	Saint Louis Art Museum	73 x 100	W.1548
Charing Cross Bridge	1899–1901	Private collection	65 x 100	W. 1549
Charing Cross Bridge	1899–1901	Private collection	65 x 81	W.1550
Charing Cross Bridge	1899–1901	Private collection	65 x 92	W. 1551
Charing Cross Bridge with tugs	1899–1901	Private collection	65 x 100	W.1552
London, Charing Cross Bridge	1899–1901	Private collection	65 x 81	W.1552a
Charing Cross Bridge (study)	1899–1901	Private collection	60 x 100	W.1553
Charing Cross Bridge, Fog on the Thames	1899–1901	Fogg Museum, Cambridge	73 x 92	W.1554
Waterloo Bridge	1899–1901	Santa Barbara Museum of Art	65 x 92	W.1555
Waterloo Bridge, London	1899–1901	Dublin City Gallery The Hugh Lane	65 x 100	W.1556
Waterloo Bridge, Grey Weather	1899–1901	Art Institute of Chicago	65 x 92	W.1557
Waterloo Bridge, Overcast	1899–1901	Private collection	65 x 100	W.1558
Waterloo Bridge, Morning Fog	1901	Philadelphia Museum of Art	65 x 100	W.1559
Waterloo Bridge	1902	Kunsthalle Hamburg	65 x 100	W.1560
Waterloo Bridge, Misty Morning	1899–1901	Ordrupgaard, Copenhagen	65 x 100	W.1561
Waterloo Bridge, Misty Weather	1899–1901	Berne Museum	65 x 100	W.1562
Waterloo Bridge, Overcast	1899–1901	Private collection	65 x 100	W.1563
Waterloo Bridge, at Dusk	1904	National Gallery of Art, Washington D.C.	65 x 100	W.1564
Waterloo Bridge	1899–1901	Denver Art Museum	65 x 100	W.1565
Waterloo Bridge, Effect of Sun in the Mist	1903	Baltimore Museum of Art	65 x 100	W.1566
Waterloo Bridge, Sun Effect	1903	Milwaukee Art Museum	73 x 92	W.1567
Waterloo Bridge	1903	Worcester Art Museum	65 x 92	W.1568
Waterloo Bridge, Grey Day	1903	National Gallery of Art, Washington D.C.	65 x 100	W.1569
Waterloo Bridge, Grey Weather, Smoky	1899–1901	Private collection	65 x 100	W.1570
Waterloo Bridge, Grey Weather	1899-1901	Private collection	65 x 92	W.1571
Waterloo Bridge, Sun in the Fog	1899–1901	Private collection	73 x 92	W.1572
Waterloo Bridge, Sunlight in the Fog	1899–1900	National Gallery of Canada, Ottawa	73 x 100	W.1573
Waterloo Bridge	1899–1901	Private collection	65 x 81	W.1574
Waterloo Bridge	1901	Davis Museum and Cultural Center, Wellesley	65 x 81	W.1575
Waterloo Bridge	1899–1901	Private collection	60 x 73	W.1576
Waterloo Bridge, Fog, Sunlight Effect	1899–1901	Caracas Museum of Contemporary Art	65 x 92	W.1577
Waterloo Bridge	1899–1901	Matsushita Museum of Art	65 x 81	W.1578
Waterloo Bridge	1899–1901	Private collection	65 x 81	W.1579
Waterloo Bridge	1901	Hermitage Museum, St Petersburg	65 x 100	W.1580
Waterloo Bridge	1901–02	Kunsthaus Zürich	65 x 100	W.1581
Waterloo Bridge, Mist Effect	1904	Private collection	65 x 100	W.1582
Waterloo Bridge at Sunset, Pink Effect	1904	National Gallery of Art, Washington D.C.	65 x 92	W.1583
Waterloo Bridge	1899–1901	Lowe Art Museum, Coral Gables	65 x 81	W.1584
Waterloo Bridge	1899–1901	Private collection	65 x 100	W.1585
Waterloo Bridge, Sunlight Effect	1903	Art Institute of Chicago	65 x 100	W.1586
Waterloo Bridge, Sunlight Effect	1899–1901	Art_Gallery_of_Hamilton	65 x 100	W.1587
Waterloo Bridge, Sunlight Effect	1903	Carnegie Museum of Art, Pittsburgh		W.1588
Waterloo Bridge, Sunlight Effect	1903	Private collection	65 x 100	W.1589
Waterloo Bridge, Hazy Sun	1903	Memorial Art Gallery, Rochester	65 x 100	W.1590
Waterloo Bridge, Hazy Sun	1903	Private collection	65 x 100	W.1591
Waterloo Bridge, Fog	1903	Private collection	65 x 92	W.1592
Waterloo Bridge, Sun Effect	1899–1901	Foundation E.G. Bührle, Zürich	65 x 100	W.1593
Waterloo Bridge, London	1900	National Museum of Western Art, Tokyo	65 x 100	W.1594
Waterloo Bridge, Fog	1899–1901	Private collection	65 x 100	W.1595
Houses of Parliament, Effect of Sunlight in the Fog	1900–01	Private collection	81 x 92	W.1596
Houses of Parliament, Sunlight Effect	1903	Brooklyn Museum, New York	81 x 92	W.1597
Houses of Parliament, Sunset	1903	National Gallery of Art, Washington D.C.	81 x 92	W.1598
Houses of Parliament, London, Symphony in Rose	1900–01	Private collection	81 x 92	W.1599
Houses of Parliament	1900–03	Art Institute of Chicago	81 x 92	W.1600
Houses of Parliament, London, Symphony in Blue	1901–02	High Museum of Art, Atlanta	81 x 92	W.1601
Houses of Parliament, Sunset	1901–02	Kunstmuseen Krefeld	81 x 92	W.1602
Houses of Parliament, Sunset	1900–01	Private collection	81 x 92	W.1603
Houses of Parliament, Sunset	1903	Private collection	81 x 92	W.1604
Houses of Parliament, Stormy Sky	1900–01	Palais des Beaux-Arts de Lille	81 x 92	W.1605
Houses of Parliament, Reflection of the Thames	1905	Musée Marmottan Monet, Paris	81 x 92	W.1606
Houses of Parliament, Sunset	1904	Kunsthaus Zürich	81 x 92	W.1607
Houses of Parliament, Fog Effect	1903	Museum of modern art André Malraux - MuMa	81 x 92	W.1608
Houses of Parliament, Fog Effect	1903	Metropolitan Museum of Art, New York	81 x 92	W.1609
Houses of Parliament, Effect of Sunlight in the Fog	1904	Musée d'Orsay, Paris	81 x 92	W.1610
Houses of Parliament, Fog Effect	1903	Museum of Fine Arts (St. Petersburg, Florida)	81 x 92	W.1611
Houses of Parliament, Seagulls	1903	Princeton University Art Museum	81 x 92	W.1612
Houses of Parliament, Seagulls	1904	Pushkin Museum, Moscow	81 x 92	W.1613
Houses of Parliament, Evening	1900–01	Private collection	80 x 91	W.1614
Leicester Square at Night	1900–01	Private collection	80 x 64	W.1615
Leicester Square at Night	1900–01	Private collection	80 x 64	W.1616
Leicester Square at Night	1900–01	Private collection	80 x 64	W.1617

== Works 1900–1907 (Giverny (continued)) ==
For Monet's Water Lilies see Water Lilies (Monet series)

Image Title	Year	Location	Dimensions (cm.)	Cat. no. Medium
The Marsh at Giverny in Winter	1899–1900	Private collection	65 x 81	W.1618
Skaters at Giverny	1899–1900	Private collection	60 x 80	W.1619
Giverny in Springtime	1899–1900	Private collection	90 x 92	W.1620
Apple Trees in Bloom at Giverny	1899–1900	Tel Aviv Museum of Art	90 x 92	W.1621
The Iris Garden at Giverny	1899–1900	Yale University Art Gallery, New Haven	90 x 92	W.1622
Garden Path	1900	Private collection	81 x 92	W.1623
Le Jardin de l'artiste à Giverny	1900	Musée d'Orsay, Paris	81 x 92	W.1624
The Garden (also known as Irises)	1900	Private collection	81 x 92	W.1625
The Main Path at Giverny	1900	Montreal Museum of Fine Arts	88 x 91	W.1627
For Water-Lily paintings W.1628 to W.1633, see Water Lilies (Monet series).
Apple Trees in Blossom at Giverny	1900	Private collection	81 x 100	W.1634
Vetheuil	1901	Pushkin Museum, Moscow	89 x 92	W.1635
Vetheuil, Morning	1901	Private collection	89 x 92	W.1636
Vetheuil, Afternoon	1901	Private collection	89 x 92	W.1637
Vetheuil, Sun Effect	1901	Private collection	82 x 92	W.1638
Vetheuil	1901	Private collection	89 x 92	W.1639
Vetheuil	1901	Private collection	81 x 92	W.1640
Vetheuil	1901	Von der Heydt Museum, Wuppertal	81 x 92	W.1641
Vetheuil, Autumn Afternoon	1901	Private collection	89 x 92	W.1642
Vetheuil	1901	Art Institute of Chicago	90 x 93	W.1643
Vetheuil, Sunset	1901	Musée d'Orsay, Paris	90 x 93	W.1644
Vetheuil, Sunset	1901	Art Institute of Chicago	89 x 92	W.1645
Vetheuil, Grey Effect	1901	Palais des Beaux-Arts de Lille	90 x 93	W.1646
Barge on the Seine at Vertheuil (also known as Vetheuil)	1901–02	Private collection	81 x 90	W.1647
Vetheuil	1902	National Museum of Western Art, Tokyo	90 x 93	W.1648
Vétheuil	1902	Private collection	90 x 93	W.1649
Pathway in Monet's Garden at Giverny	1901–02	Österreichische Galerie Belvedere	89 x 92	W.1650
The Flowered Garden	1901–02	Private collection	89 x 92	W.1651
The Garden Path at Giverny	1902–03	Private collection	81 x 92	W.1652
For Water-Lily paintings W.1656 to W.1691, see Water Lilies (Monet series).
Still Life with Eggs	1907	Private collection	73 x 92	W.1692
Still Life with Eggs	1907	Private collection	73 x 92	W.1693
For Water-Lily paintings W.1694 to W.1735, see Water Lilies (Monet series).

== Works 1908 Venice ==
For Monet's Water Lilies see Water Lilies (Monet series)

Image Title	Year	Location	Dimensions (cm.)	Cat. no. Medium
The Grand Canal	1908	Fine Arts Museums of San Francisco	73 x 92	W.1736
The Grand Canal and Santa Maria della Salute	1908	Beyeler Foundation, Riehen	73 x 92	W.1737
The Grand Canal	1908	Museum of Fine Arts, Boston	73 x 92	W.1738
The Grand Canal	1908	Private collection	73 x 92	W.1739
The Grand Canal and Santa Maria della Salute	1908	Private collection	73 x 92	W.1740
The Grand Canal, Venice	1908	Private collection	81 x 92	W.1741
The Ducal Palace	1908	Private collection	73 x 92	W.1742
The Doges' Palace	1908	Brooklyn Museum, New York	81 x 100	W.1743
The Doges' Palace (also known as Le Palais Ducal)	1908	Private collection	80 x 92	W.1744
San Giorgio Maggiore	1908	Private collection	60 x 73	W.1745
San Giorgio Maggiore	1908	Private collection	60 x 73	W.1746
San Giorgio Maggiore	1908	National Museum Cardiff	60 x 80	W.1747
San Giorgio Maggiore	1908	Private collection	65 x 92	W.1748
San Giorgio Maggiore	1908	Indianapolis Museum of Art	65 x 92	W.1749
San Giorgio Maggiore by twilight	1908	Private collection	59 x 81	W.1750
Ducal Palace seen from San Giorgio Maggiore	1908	Kunsthaus Zürich	65 x 100	W.1751
The Doges' Palace Seen from San Giorgio Maggiore	1908	Private collection	65 x 100	W.1752
	1908	Lost in Fire		W.1753
The Doges' Palace Seen from San Giorgio Maggiore	1908	Private collection	65 x 92	W.1754
The Doges' Palace Seen from San Giorgio Maggiore	1908	Metropolitan Museum of Art, New York	65 x 92	W.1755
The Doges' Palace Seen from San Giorgio Maggiore	1908	Solomon R. Guggenheim Museum, New York	65 x 100	W.1756
Palazzo Dario	1908	Art Institute of Chicago	65 x 81	W.1757
Palazzo Dario	1908	Private collection	81 x 66	W.1758
Palazzo Dario	1908	National Museum Cardiff	92 x 73	W.1759
Palazzo Dario	1908	Private collection	56 x 65	W.1760
Rio della Salute	1908	Private collection	81 x 65	W.1761
Rio della Salute	1908	Private collection	81 x 65	W.1762
Rio della Salute	1908	Private collection	100 x 65	W.1763
Palazzo da Mula	1908	National Gallery of Art, Washington D.C.	62 x 81	W.1764
Palazzo da Mula	1908	Private collection	65 x 92	W.1765
Palazzo Contarini	1908	Museum Barberini	73 x 92	W.1766
Palazzo Contarini	1908	Kunstmuseum St. Gallen	92 x 81	W.1767
San Giorgio Maggiore at Dusk	1908	National Museum Cardiff	65 x 92	W.1768
Twilight, Venice	1908	Artizon Museum, Tokyo	73 x 92	W.1769
The Palazzo Ducale	1908	Private collection	57 x 92	W.1770
The Red House	1908	Private collection	65 x 81	W.1771
Gondola in Venice	1908	Musée d'Arts de Nantes	81 x 55	W.1772

== Works 1908–1926 Giverny (continued) ==
For Monet's Water Lilies see Water Lilies (Monet series)

Image Title	Year	Location	Dimensions (cm.)	Cat. no. Medium
Grainstack at Sunset	1908	Private collection	11.7 x 19	W.1773
Landscape at Port-Villez	1908–12	National Museum of Western Art, Tokyo	10.5 x 18	W.1774
The Seine at Port-Villez	1908–12	Private collection	14.6 x 22.8	W.1775
The Seine at Port-Villez	1908–12	Private collection	17.5 x 24	W.1776
The Artist's House at Giverny	1913	Private collection	73 x 73	W.1777
The Artist's House at Giverny	1913	Private collection	73 x 92	W.1778
The Flowered Arches at Giverny	1913	Phoenix Art Museum	81 x 92	W.1779
Rose Arches at Giverny (also known as The Floral Arch)	1913	Private collection	81 x 92	W.1780
For Water-Lily paintings W.1781 to W.1817, see Water Lilies (Monet series).
Hamerocallis	1914–17	Musée Marmottan Monet, Paris	150 x 140	W.1818
Hamerocallis on the Edge of the Pond	1914–17	Private collection	200 x 200	W.1819
Agapanthus	1914–17	Musée Marmottan Monet, Paris	200 x 150	W.1820
Water-Lilies and Agapanthus	1914–17	Musée Marmottan Monet, Paris	140 x 120	W.1821
Agapanthus	1914–17	Museum of Modern Art, New York	200 x 180	W.1822
Irises and Water-lilies	1914–17	Private collection	130 x 200	W.1823
Yellow Irises	1914–17	Private collection	138 x 54	W.1824
Irises	1914–17	Private collection	120 x 100	W.1825
Yellow Irises	1914–17	National Museum of Western Art, Tokyo	200 x 100	W.1826
Lilac Irises	1914–17	Private collection	200 x 100	W.1827
The Path through the Irises	1914–17	Metropolitan Museum of Art, New York	200 x 180	W.1828
Irises	1914–17	National Gallery, London	200 x 150	W.1829
Irises at the Edge of the Path	1914–17	Private collection	200 x 200	W.1830
Irises	1914–17	Private collection	200 x 150	W.1831
Irises	1914–17	Virginia Museum of Fine Arts, Richmond	200 x 150	W.1832
Irises	1914–17	Art Institute of Chicago	200 x 200	W.1833
Yellow Irises	1914–17	Private collection	150 x 130	W.1834
	1914–17	Private collection	107 x 107	W.1835
Irises	1914–17	Private collection	100 x 88	W.1836
Yellow Irises and Malva	1914–17	Private collection	106 x 155	W.1837
Irises	1914-17	Private collection	160 x 180	W.1838
Yellow Irises	1914–17	Musée Marmottan Monet, Paris	130 x 152	W.1839
Blue Ireses	1914-17	Private collection	100 x 72	W.1840
Irises	1914–17	Musée Marmottan Monet, Paris	105 x 73	W.1841
Yellow Iris	1914–17	Private collection	61 x 46	W.1842
Self Portrait	1917	Musée d'Orsay, Paris	70 x 55	W.1843
Self Portrait	1917	Destroyed by the artist		W.1844
The Port of Honfleur	1917	Saarland Museum, Saarbrücken	60 x 80	W.1845
Boats in the Port of Honfleur	1917	Musée Marmottan Monet, Paris	50 x 61	W.1846
The Bell Tower of Saint Catherine at Honfleur	1917	Musée Eugène Boudin, Honfleur	55 x 43	W.1847
Weeping Willow and Water-Lily Pond	1916–19	Musée Marmottan Monet, Paris	200 x 180	W.1848
Weeping Willow and Water-Lily Pond	1916–19	Private collection	200 x 180	W.1849
Water-Lilies	1916–19	Musée Marmottan Monet, Paris	200 x 180	W.1850
Weeping Willow and Water-Lily Pond	1916–19	Private collection	104 x 180	W.1851
For Water-Lily paintings W.1852 to W.1865, see Water Lilies (Monet series).
Weeping Willow and Water-Lily Pond	1916–19	Private collection	140 x 150	W.1866
Weeping Willow and Water-Lily Pond	1916–19	Private collection	150 x 130	W.1867
Weeping Willow	1918	Private collection	130 x 90	W.1868
Weeping Willow	1918	Columbus Museum of Art	130 x 110	W.1869
	1918–19	Private collection	130 x 152	W.1870
Weeping Willow	1918–19	Private collection	130 x 100	W.1871
Weeping Willow	1918–19	Private collection	100 x 80	W.1872
Weeping Willow	1918–19	Musée Marmottan Monet, Paris	100 x 100	W.1873
Weeping Willow	1918–19	Private collection	100 x 120	W.1874
Weeping Willow	1918–19	Musée Marmottan Monet, Paris	100 x 120	W.1875
Weeping Willow	1918–19	Kimbell Art Museum, Fort Worth	100 x 120	W.1876
Weeping Willow	1918–19	Musée Marmottan Monet, Paris	100 x 110	W.1877
For Water-Lily paintings W.1879 to W.1902, see Water Lilies (Monet series).
Wisteria	1917–20	Musée Marmottan Monet, Paris	100 x 300	W.1903
Wisteria	1917–20	Musée Marmottan Monet, Paris	100 x 300	W.1904
Wisteria	1917–20	Musée d'Art et d'Histoire, Dreux	100 x 200	W.1905
Wisteria (left half)	1917–19	Private collection	150 x 200	W.1906
Wisteria (right half)	1917–19	Private collection	150 x 200	W.1907
Wisteria	1919–20	Kunstmuseum Den Haag	150 x 200	W.1908
Wisteria	1919–20	Allen Memorial Art Museum, Oberlin	150 x 200	W.1909
Wisteria	1918-24	Private collection	150 x 200	W.1910
The Japanese Bridge	1918–24	Musée Marmottan Monet, Paris	100 x 200	W.1911
The Japanese Bridge	1918-24	Private collection	100 x 200	W.1912
The Japanese Bridge	1918–24	Musée Marmottan Monet, Paris	100 x 200	W.1913
The Japanese Bridge	1918–24	Musée Marmottan Monet, Paris	74 x 92	W.1914
The Japanese Bridge	1918–24	Private collection	73 x 100	W.1915
The Footbridge over the Water-Lily Pond	1918-24	Kunstmuseum Basel	65 x 107	W.1916
The Japanese Bridge	1918–24	Private collection	73 x 107	W.1917
The Japanese Bridge	1918–24	Private collection	89 x 92	W.1918
The Japanese Bridge	1918–24	São Paulo Museum of Art	87 x 90	W.1919
The Japanese Bridge	1918–24	Kunsthaus Zürich	80 x 92	W.1920
The Japanese Bridge	1918–24	Beyeler Foundation, Riehen	89 x 116	W.1921
The Japanese Bridge	1917–20	Van Gogh Museum, Amsterdam	89 x 116	W.1921a
The Japanese Bridge	1918–24	Unknown	Unknown	W.1922
The Japanese Bridge	1918–24	Musée Marmottan Monet, Paris	89 x 100	W.1923
The Japanese Bridge	1918–24	Musée Marmottan Monet, Paris	89 x 100	W.1924
The Japanese Bridge	1918–24	Museum of Fine Arts, Houston	89 x 93	W.1925
The Japanese Bridge	1918–24	Private collection	89 x 93	W.1926
The Japanese Bridge	1918–24	Musée Marmottan Monet, Paris	89 x 100	W.1927
The Japanese Bridge	1918–24	Musée Marmottan Monet, Paris	89 x 100	W.1928
The Japanese Bridge	1918–24	Private collection	89 x 93	W.1929
The Japanese Bridge	1918–24	Philadelphia Museum of Art	89 x 91	W.1930
The Japanese Bridge	1918–24	Minneapolis Institute of Art	89 x 116	W.1931
The Japanese Bridge	1920–22	Museum of Modern Art, New York	89 x 116	W.1932
The Japanese Bridge	1918–24	Musée Marmottan Monet, Paris	89 x 116	W.1933
The Path under the Rose Trees	1918–24	Musée Marmottan Monet, Paris	89 x 116	W.1934
The Path under the Rose Trees	1918–24	Private collection	100 x 100	W.1935
The Path under the Rose Arches	1918–24	Private Collection	89 x 100	W.1936
The Path under the Rose Trees	1918–24	Musée Marmottan Monet, Paris	90 x 92	W.1937
The Path under the Rose Trees	1918–24	Musée Marmottan Monet, Paris	92 x 89	W.1938
The Path under the Rose Trees	1920–22	Musée Marmottan Monet, Paris	81 x 100	W.1939
The Path under the Rose Trees	1920–22	Private collection	73 x 105	W.1940
Weeping Willow	1920–22	Private collection	120 x 100	W.1941
Weeping Willow	1920–22	Musée d'Orsay, Paris	110 x 100	W.1942
Weeping Willow	1920–22	Musée Marmottan Monet, Paris	116 x 89	W.1943
The Artist's House Seen from the Rose Garden	1922–24	Musée Marmottan Monet, Paris	89 x 92	W.1944
The Artist's House, View from the Rose Garden	1922–24	Musée Marmottan Monet, Paris	81 x 93	W.1945
The House Seen from the Rose Garden	1922–24	Musée Marmottan Monet, Paris	81 x 92	W.1946
The House Seen from the Rose Garden	1922–24	Musée Marmottan Monet, Paris	89 x 100	W.1947
''The House Seen from the Rose Garden	1922–24	Private collection	89 x 91	W.1948
The House Seen from the Rose Garden	1922–24	Private collection	100 x 74	W.1949
The House Seen from the Rose Garden	1922–24	Private collection	93 x 81	W.1950
The House Seen from the Rose Garden	1922–24	Private collection	100 x 89	W.1951
The Garden at Giverny	1922–24	Musée Marmottan Monet, Paris	93 x 74	W.1952
The House amongst the Roses	1925	Private collection	89 x 100	W.1953
The House amongst the Roses	1925	Private collection	73 x 93	W.1954
The House amongst the Roses	1925	Private collection	59 x 72	W.1955
The House amongst the Roses	1925	Albertina, Vienna	91 x 89	W.1956
The House among the Roses	1925	Thyssen-Bornemisza Museum, Madrid	92 x 73	W.1957
The House among Roses	1925-26	Private collection	92 x 73	W.1958
The House Seen through the Roses	1925–26	Stedelijk Museum, Amsterdam	66 x 82	W.1959
The House through the Roses	1925–26	Private collection	62 x 80	W.1960
The House through the Roses	1925–26	Private collection	73 x 91	W.1961
The House Seen through the Roses	1925-26	Private collection	55 x 92	W.1962
The Rose Bush	1925–26	Musée Marmottan Monet, Paris	130 x 200	W.1963
For Water-Lily paintings W.1964 to W.1992, see Water Lilies (Monet series).
