= Fondation Monet in Giverny =

Nonprofit that preserves the estate of Claude Monet in Giverny, France

Fondation Claude Monet
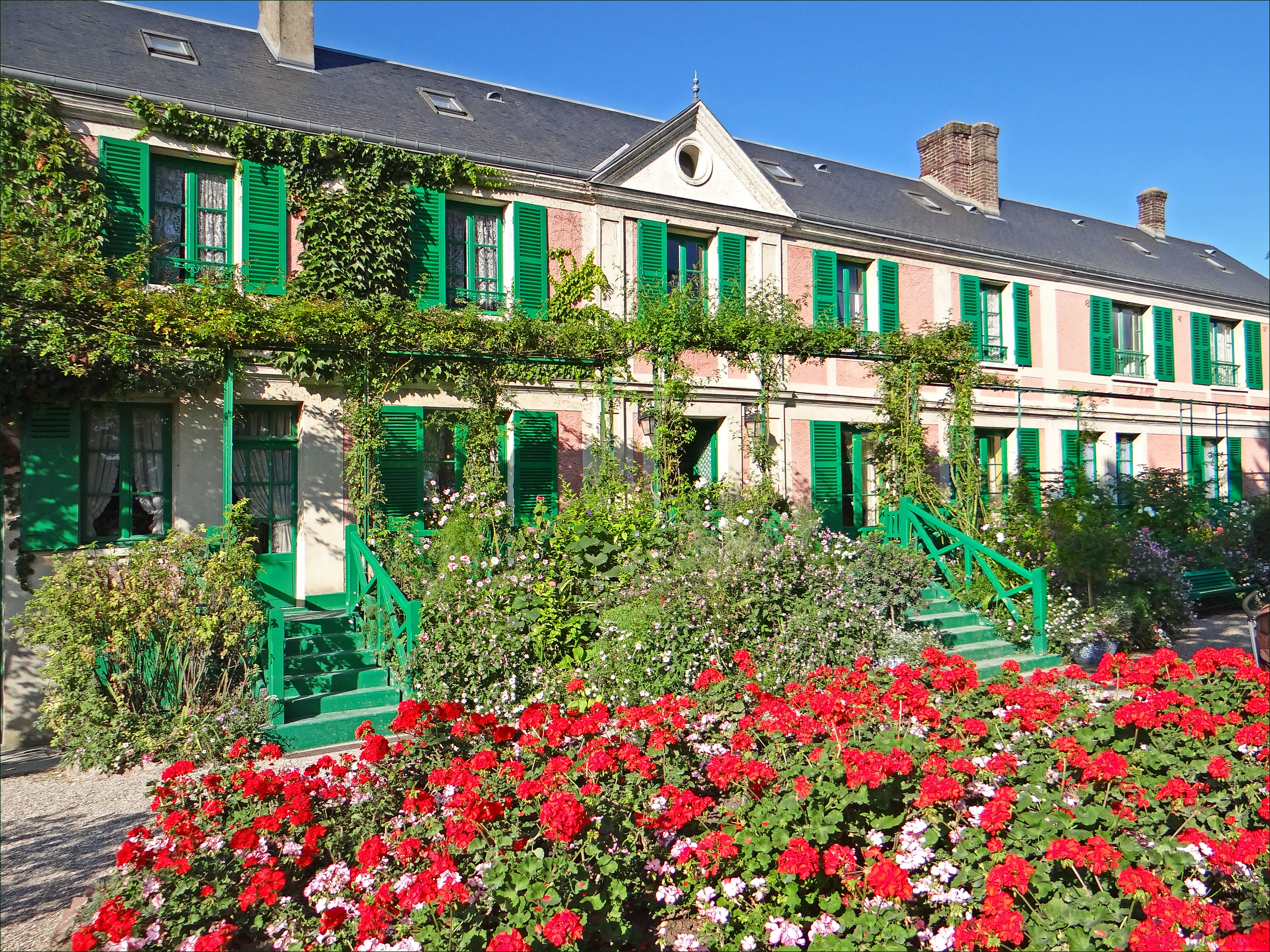
- Monet's house from the garden

- Location within France
- Established: 1980
- Location: Giverny, France
- Coordinates: 49.0753559°N 1.5337515°E
- Visitors: 750,000 (2023)
- Website: fondation-monet.com

The Fondation Claude Monet is a nonprofit that manages the house and gardens of Claude Monet in Giverny, France, where Monet lived and painted for 43 years. Monet was inspired by his gardens, and spent years transforming them, planting thousands of flowers. He believed that it was important to surround himself with nature and paint outdoors. He created many paintings of his house and gardens, especially of water lilies in the pond, the Japanese bridge, and a weeping willow tree.

With a total of 530,000 visitors in 2010, it is the second most visited tourist site in Normandy after the island of Mont Saint-Michel. The house and gardens have been listed among the Maisons des Illustres and classified as a Jardin Remarquable. The estate was classified as a monument historique in 1976.

Monet's paintings of the gardens, especially the sites' pond with water lilies, are exhibited in dozens of major collections.

== History ==
When the owner of the Villa Saint-Louis in Poissy where Claude Monet had lived since 17 December 1881 threatened to take him to court over unpaid rent, Monet was able to obtain a stay of execution before he would be evicted on the 15 April 1883. As a result, Monet began looking for an affordable house to rent close to Paris to keep in contact with the dealers and the art scene but sufficiently far enough away from its rivalries and gossip, particularly because he was living with a married woman, Alice Hoschedé. He wanted a house large enough to accommodate his extended Monet-Hoschedé family of 10; consisting of himself, his 5 and 15 year old sons as well as Alice and her six children ranging in age from 5 to 19. As he wanted to live in Normandy and somewhere downstream from Poissy and close to enough to a boarding school which Michel Monet and Jean-Pierre Hoschedé could attend.

On 5 April he set off on another house hunting trip by taking the Gisors to Pacy-sur-Eure railway line that stopped along the Epte river at every village between Vernon and Gasny. From his carriage he discovered Giverny, a small village of 279 inhabitants. Surrounded by small farms, it was home to a blacksmith, three mills, a school and had a railway station. It was also across the Seine from the town of Vernon, which offers a school which the older children could attend. Finally, he came across a vacant long two-storey slate-roofed farmhouse called “Le Pressoir” (the cider press) with pink rendered walls and grey shutters. It featured a cellar, four rooms on the ground floor, four rooms on the first floor, and two rooms in the Mansard roof, which also had an attic To the west of the main house was a small building which featured its own kitchen, storage store and a stable. These stood on a 960 m^{2} (10,300 sq ft) section of land, bordered by at the rear of the house by the village's main street, the Grand Rue or Rue du Village (now rue Claude Monet). The front of the house faced south onto a garden and an orchard with apple and pear trees, which extended for 50 yards (46 m) as far as the east–west running street of Chemin du Roy, on the other side of which ran a railway line. During Monet's lifetime four trains ran along the line on all days except Sunday. Extending from each end of the main house was a stone wall that enclosed the entire property, which included within its boundaries a barn on the western side, as well as a woodshed and the outhouse on the eastern side.

Its owner, farmer and winegrower Louis-Joseph Singeot, unaware of his future tenant's history of missing rent payments agreed to rent it and Monet with his two children in tow moved in on 29 April 1883. Alice and her children joined them the next day. The rental agreement was signed on 3 May with Monet obtaining an advance of 5,000 francs from Durand-Ruel to pay the initial rental payment.

In their first year in residence the couple planted the garden, painted the house shutters green, painted the dining room in two shades of yellow, and renovated the kitchen. During their early years in residence Monet had the pines which bordered a central alley through the property cut down, keeping only the two yews closest to the house to please Alice. He also constructed a boathouse on an island in the Seine, a kilometre from the house. Over that summer he explored the surrounding area by boat.

In December 1885 Monet converted the west barn into a studio by installing a wooden floor and a large window and connected it via a covered staircase to the house. It is believed that Monet created his first paintings of his garden in 1888. At the 1889 Exposition Universelle in Paris Monet is believed to have seen a display of hybrid water lilies developed from reddish flowers and met their creator, the horticulturist Joseph Bory Latour-Marliac.

=== Purchases Le Pressoir ===
In May 1890 Singeot decided to put the property up for sale. Monet jumped at the opportunity and wrote to dealer Paul Durand-Ruel requesting an advance, “I must ask you for a significant amount of money, being on the cusp of purchasing the house where I live or having to leave Giverny, the loss of which I would feel keenly, certain of never again finding such a setting nor such a beautiful area.” Why Monet needed Durand-Ruel financial assistance is unknown as since 1886, when Durand-Ruel had unlocked the American market for him, Monet had enjoyed growing wealth. In 1889, the sale of just one of his paintings – ‘The Seine at Vétheuil’ – had earned Monet 7,900 francs, while the "15 Haystacks" exhibition of 4 May 1891 had been profitable, with fellow artist Pissarro reporting, “Soon after opening, everything had sold for three to four thousand each!”

The sale was finalized on 17 November 1890 in the offices of Maître Grimpard, a notary in Vernon. The purchase price of 20,000 francs was payable in four instalments on 1 November each year from 1891 onwards. The deed of sale described the property as having “a single painting studio in the wing, on the western end of the main house.” On 7 March 1891 the first detailed description of Monet's garden in given in an article by Mirbeau entitled "Claude Monet" in the magazine L'Art dans les deux mondes.

In June 1891 Monet took advice from a Japanese gardener. This is believed to have been Wasuke Hata (1865–1928) who had come to France to assist with the creation of the Japanese pavilion at the Exposition Universelle of 1889. He then remained in France for the rest of his life creating Japanese gardens for Robert de Montesquiou, Hugues Krafft as well as Edmond James de Rothschild at Boulogne-sur-Seine. In 1892 the first gardener was hired by Monet, which by 1904 had increased to six full time gardeners under the leadership of Felix Breuil. Breuil had been recruited with the assistance of Octave Mirbeau, as he was the son of the gardener who worked for Mirbeau's father. One gardener working from a small boat was responsible for cleaning the surface of the pond as well as dusting and washing the water lilies. Monet cultivated approximately 70 species, spending large amounts of money on the garden, even going as far as paying for the public road separating the two gardens to be tar sealed to reduce the dust on the lilies.

By early September 1892 work was underway on the construction of new glasshouse on the property. It featured a heating system and Monet, together with his wife and stepdaughters, spent its first night of operation checking that it was working correctly in order to protect the gloxinias he was growing.

=== Purchases land for the water garden ===
The beginning of 1893 witnessed an increase in Monet's interest in gardening, a passion he shared with his painter friend and great patron, Gustave Caillebotte. Thus, he visited Mr. Varenne, director of the Jardin des Plantes (botanical garden) in Rouen. He also purchased many of his plants from the gardeners of Rouen. Regarding gardening, Monet declared: "What is there to say about me? What can there be to say, I ask you, about a man who is interested in nothing in the world but his painting - and also his garden and his flowers.

On 5 February 1893, ten years after his arrival at Giverny, Monet bought the 1,268 square metres (13,650 sq ft) piece of land opposite his property on the other side of the railway line, with plans to create a water garden on it. The land was partly marshy and crossed by a small brook, the Ru, a diversion of the Epte, a tributary of the Seine River. Its location led Georges Clemenceau to say "and what's more, he has the train at home!"

On 17 March 1893 Monet asked the Eure district commissioner for permission to have a pond that he had dug filled by diverting water from the adjacent Ru; when full, the pond would irrigate his property. He also wished to construct two wooden bridges over the Ru to allow access to property on the other side that he had rented. A number of Givernois opposed his plan, claiming that his flowers would poison the stream, while civil engineers from the authorities following an inspection of the site also raised a number of concerns. This upset Monet, who by 20 March was considering abandoning the project, exclaiming, "..shit on the Giverny natives, the engineers," and had thoughts of throwing the lily plants in the river. But he recovered his enthusiasm and submitted a revised request on 24 March. On 19 April the municipality turned it down. Monet appealed the decision by applying to the Prefect of the Eure, explaining in a letter dated 17 July 1893 that the work was to “cultivate aquatic plants … for the pleasure of the eyes and in order to have subjects to paint.” On 27 July 1893 the Prefect approved Monet's application.

By October the water garden was well underway, with Julie Manet on a visit with her mother recording the existence of an “ornamental lake across which is a green bridge which looks rather Japanese.” Later to be known as the Japanese bridge, it was built by a local craftsman.

Following the wedding of his son Jean and Blanche in 1897, Monet began the construction of a building on the northwest end of the Clos Normand. Completed sometime prior to August 1898, this had a darkroom, garage and gardener's storage area on the ground floor. The first floor housed a new studio, with a large northern facing window overlooking the street and a glassed-in balcony on the south side facing the garden. On the second floor were two apartments for visiting family members. The creation of this new studio allowed Monet to convert the existing studio into a smoking lounge, though he tended to use the new studio to only finish paintings and as a showroom for those wishing to purchase artworks directly from him.

On 10 May 1901 Monet spent 1,200 francs purchasing more land on the south bank of the Ru to allow expansion of the water garden. Following a visit during the summer, the art critic Arsène Alexandre described the garden in an article published on 9 August in Le Figaro, "When the sunlight plays upon the water, it resembles - damascened as it is with the water lilies' great round leaves and encrusted with the precious stones of their flowers - the masterwork of a goldsmith who has melded alloys of the most magical metals."

In July 1902 Monet swapped some land with the railway company. On 13 August of that year he successfully petitioned the Giverny Municipal council for permission to divert more water to the pond. He was granted permission for three months, provided he installed regulating sluices. With more water available work began, which involved diverting the Ru further to the south via a newly dug bed, which in turn allowed the lily pond to be approximately tripled in size and to include a small island. Four new bridges were also constructed over the diverted stream. By February 1902 the work was completed, allowing Monet's gardeners on 26 and 27th of that month to plant water lilies in the enlarged pond. In 1906 giant bamboo were planted.

The flood of the Seine in January 1910 caused its water to rise to 8 metres (26 ft) at Paris. Although Giverny was on a hill it had its rail and road links cut, with the floodwaters covering the water garden and coming to halfway up the central path of the flower garden at “Le Pressoir”. Monet was despondent, his wife recording in a letter to her daughter Germaine, “Monet more and more excessive (everything is lost, things will never come back, he must sell the house, the car.)” The garden was again flooded in March of that same year, again leaving it covered in mud, straw and dead wildlife.

In response to the flood, Monet in March of that year contoured the banks of the lily pond, with asymmetries and curves which today remains its final shape, four times its original size.

In a wave of optimism just before his 75th birthday and despite wartime restrictions on labour and materials, Monet obtained a work permit on 5 July 1915 to construct a third studio on the northeast of the property which he had recently been able to extend by the purchase of an adjacent plot. Overseen by Maurice Lancruit, a builder from Vernon, it was budgeted at 30,000 francs without any central heating but ended up costing 50,000 francs. It was a large standalone building 23 metres (75 ft) by 12 metres (39 ft) by 15 metres (49 ft) high and topped by a large skylight, designed to accommodate his Grand Decorations’ series of water lily paintings, which he moved around on castors. Monet admitted “I am ashamed to have had it built, I who always scream at those who make Giverny ugly.”

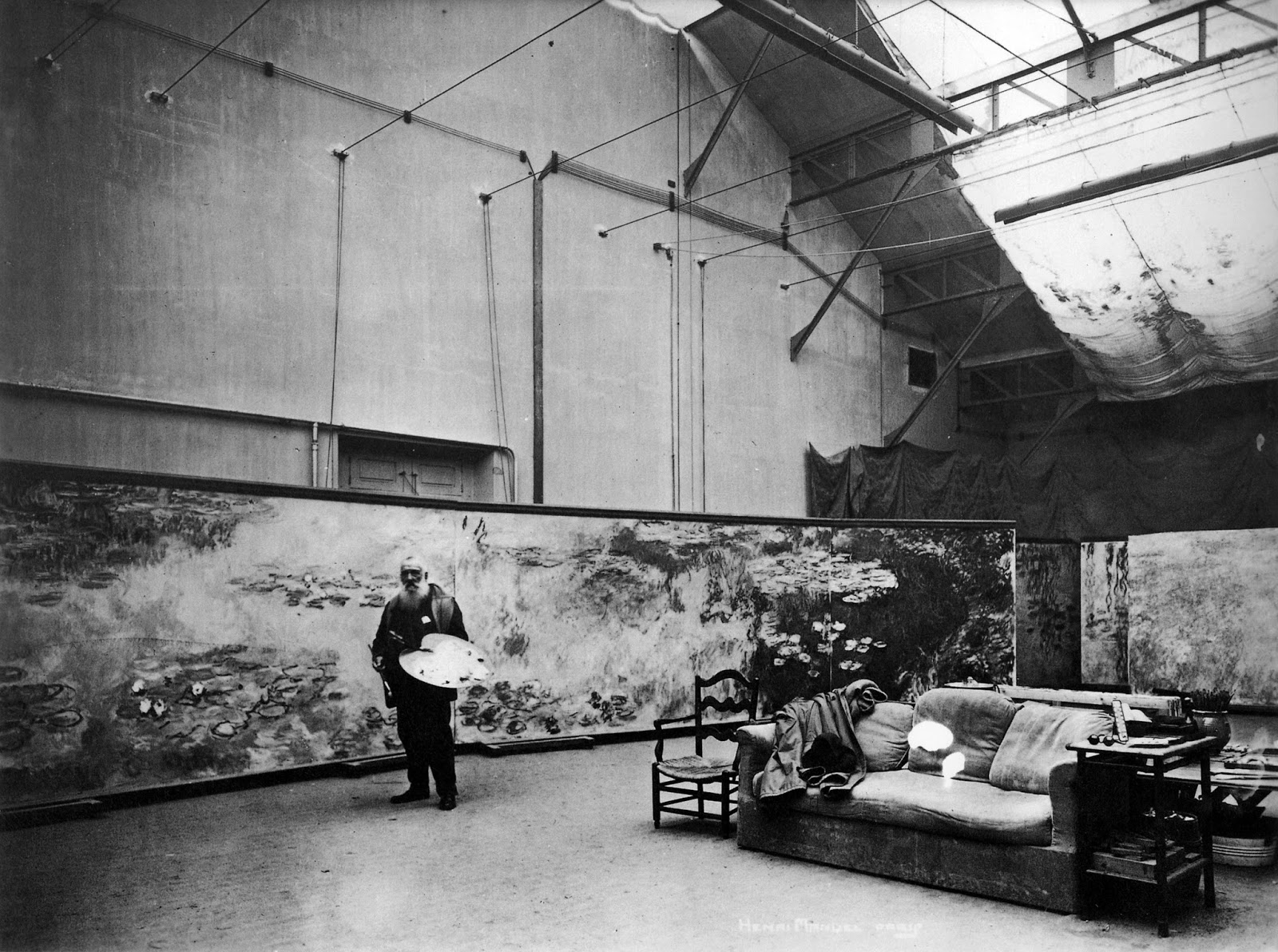
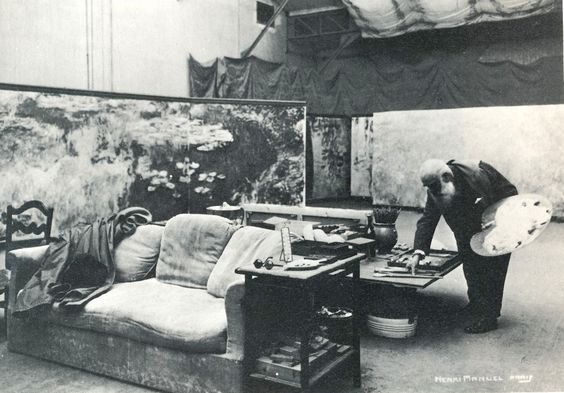
Monet at work in his large studio, now the Fondation's gift shop

In the 1920s the horticulturalist Georges Truffaut visited from Versailles and wrote an article on Giverny for the magazine Jardinage.

Louis Gillet, after a visit in the 1920s, wrote: “It was in summer that you had to see him, in this famous garden which is his luxury and his glory, and for which he did follies as a king for a mistresses, … the nymphéas pond was the master’s jewel, the nymph with whom he was in love.”

=== Death of Monet ===
When Claude Monet died on 5 December 1926, leaving no will his only surviving son Michel, inherited everything including the Giverny property, the paintings there and the important collection of 243 Japanese prints. Preferring to go on safari in Africa, he was not interested in living in the family home and within nine months of his father's death had purchased a property at Sorel-Moussel, 40 km (25 mi), away, where he constructed his own garden. As a result, Blanche Hoschedé Monet, the daughter of Monet's second wife Alice and widow of his eldest son, Jean, continued to live in the house. She altered nothing, maintaining the property with the help of the former head gardener, Louis Lebret. She also began to paint again, notable works being The Flower Lawn and On the Bridge. She also bought up her great-nephew Jean-Marie Toulgouat (1927–2006), who was the only child of Lily Butler and Roger Toulgouat. Blanche and Jean-Marie were obliged in 1944 to welcome Field Marshall Erwin Rommel, who was stationed close by at La Roche-Guyon when he called to pay his respects. Both refused to shake his hand.

After Blanche died in 1947, the garden was left untended, water lily painting were stacked against walls in the studio, with birds able to fly in and out of broken windows, while mud had invaded the lily pond and termites had undermined the bridge.

In the early 1950s, while studying art at the Beaux-Arts de Paris in Paris, the American artist Ellsworth Kelly visited Monet's property at Giverny. He was inspired by the paintings that sat unloved in Monet's studio to create a painting he titled Tableau Vert immediately upon his return to Paris.

Michel Monet died in a car accident in 1966. Having no heirs, he bequeathed, at the instigation of Jean Moreau, mayor of Sorel-Moussel, the Giverny estate as well as his father's remaining paintings and art collection to the Académie des Beaux-Arts. Immediately following his death a police guard was put in place at both his residence at Sorel-Moussel and at Giverny to prevent any intrusion into the properties. A few days later, in the presence of Emmanuel Bondeville, permanent secretary of the Académie des Beaux-Arts, an inventory was carried out by Maître Bourdon, a notary from Abondant, of Michel Monet's residence in Sorel-Moussel. There were 91 paintings and drawings: 48 of them works by Claude Monet, four works by Auguste Renoir, as well as paintings and drawings by Edgar Degas, Eugène Boudin, Gustave Caillebotte, Berthe Morisot, Paul Signac and Alfred Sisley.

They transferred the artworks to the Musée Marmottan. While Jacques Carlu, who was a member of the Académie des Beaux-Arts, and, as such, curator of the Musée Marmottan, did not have sufficient financial resources to undertake a major restoration of Giverny. He nevertheless rebuilt the roof, protected the prints, which were already showing signs of damage, and moved what was left of the painting collection at Giverny to the Musée Marmottan.

A report broadcast on 15 March 1966 on the ORTF channel, almost two months after Michel Monet's death, shows the house in Giverny as it was then. The report shows numerous paintings, which have just been inventoried, as well as the painter's studio, in a state of abandonment. The visit was guided by Guy Bourdon, the notary responsible for administering the estate's legacy,

=== Restoration ===
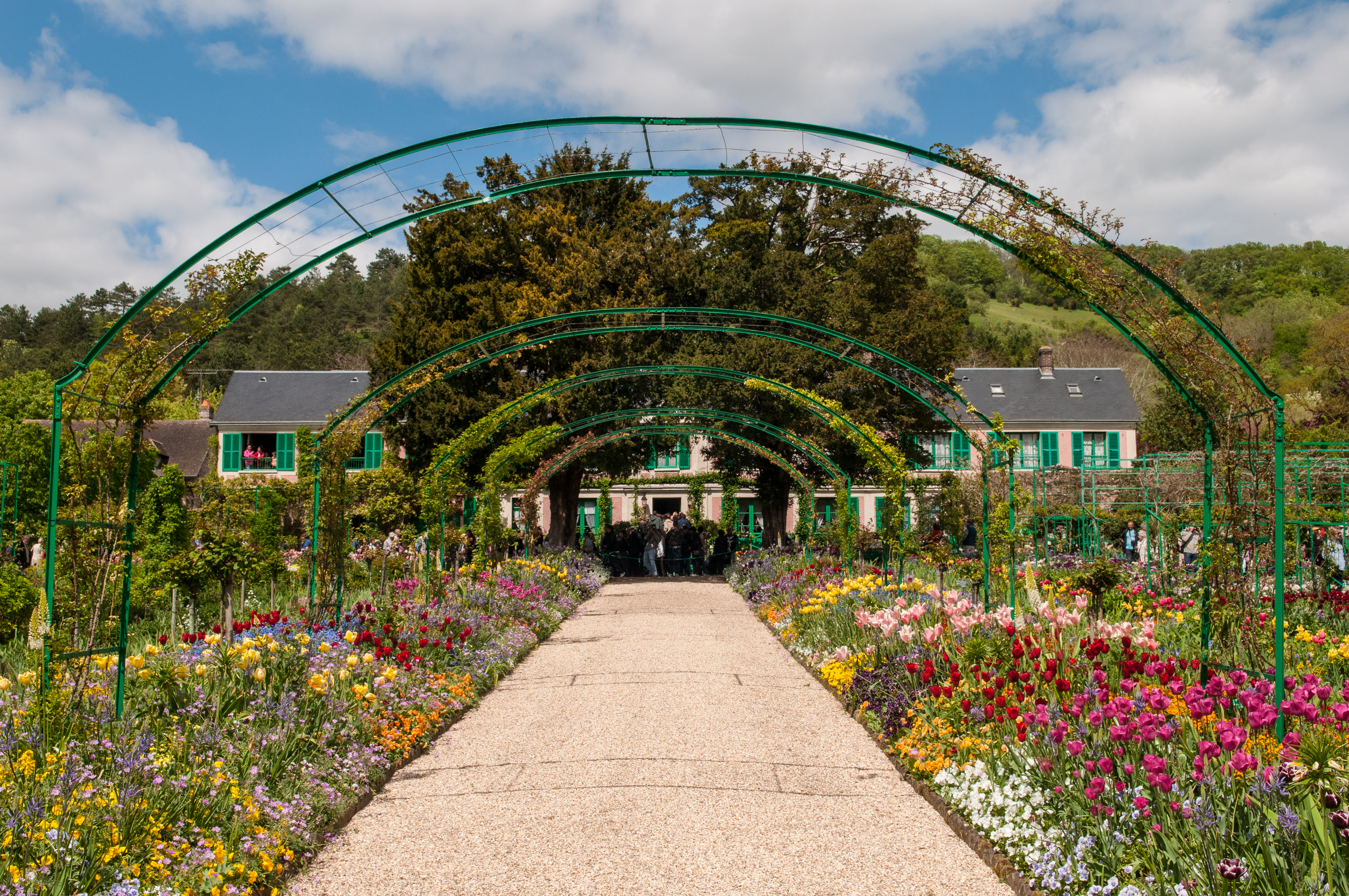
The restored house and gardens

Following Jacques Carlu's death in 1977, the Académie des Beaux-Arts asked Gérald Van der Kemp (1912–2001), a member of the Académie des Beaux-Arts, who while chief curator of the Château de Versailles from 1953 to 1980 had completed a number of successful restoration projects, to help save Giverny.

With insufficient funds available from the Académie des Beaux-Arts and the Eure Departmental Council, Van der Kemp, as he had successfully done at Versailles, turned to private American benefactors for financial help, expanding the Versailles Foundation to include Giverny. The first significant benefactress was flower lover and a longtime art patron Lila Acheson Wallace, who already owned several Monet's. Others quickly followed, among them members of the Mellon family as well as philanthropist Walter Annenberg. Annenberg funded an underpass to allowed visitors to walk from the Clos Normand to the water garden without having to cross the busy Chemin du Roy.

By the time the estate was opened to the public, approximately 95 percent of the restoration cost of US$7 million had been met by private contributions, the majority via the Versailles Foundation-Giverny Inc. of New York. These American donations were part of the American tradition of private giving as well as the tax concessions that encourage it. These tax concessions had existed since 1969 when U.S. President Richard M. Nixon approved a change to the American tax code that allowed Americans to claim tax deductions for their contributions to charities. Nixon encouraged Americans to donate to France. "I felt that encouraging Americans to contribute to the heritage of France, one of our oldest allies, would be one way to remind ourselves that the past in many ways is infinitely more important than the present." For his service, Nixon was inducted into the Academie des Beaux-Arts as one of the 15 foreign members, following former President Dwight D. Eisenhower's induction in 1952.

Substantial work needed to be done: the floors and ceiling beams were rotting while a staircase had already collapsed. Most of the window panes in both the greenhouse and main house had shattered long ago, and three large trees had begun to grow in the largest studio. The pond had to be dug again. In the Clos Normand, soil was removed to find the original ground level. Then the same flower species as those used by Monet in his time were planted."

The Fondation Claude Monet was created in 1980 as the estate was declared public. It soon became very successful, and now welcomes visitors from April to November.

When Gérald Van der Kemp died in 2001, his widow Florence (Downs Schlubach-Carr Van der Kemp, née Harris) became the curator of the Fondation Claude Monet and continued renovating the property until her death in 2008. She was succeeded as director in March 2008 by Hugues Gall, who remained in that position until his death at the age of 84 in May 2024. To satisfy demand Gall opened the site seven days a week. In 2011 the studio salon was reconstructed with the help of Sylvie Patin, Honorary General Curator of Heritage at the Musée d'Orsay and Correspondent of the Institute. Based upon photographs from 1915 and 1920, copies of the original paintings that at the time occupied the studio were installed. In 2013 Monet’s bedroom was reconstructed, based upon on the writings of Gustave Geffroy and Julie Manet. Blanche Hoschedé-Monet's bedroom was also reconstructed and opened to the public in 2014.

British gardener James Priest, who has been in charge of restorations made to Monet's garden, taught himself the ways of the painter, particularly Monet's watercolouring. In 2014 Priest reported that although the garden was disfigured by some previous gardeners and is worn-down from time, it is still beautiful and has potential. He says that the lily-ponds remained in a similar state, and need restoration in Monet's color palette in returning the graded cool tones to the flower beds.

As one of the most visited tourist destinations in France, Monet’s garden at Giverny is protected by long term strategies ensuring its ongoing preservation.

For the 2026 season, which marked the centenary of Monet's death, the gardeners returned the surroundings of the water-lily pond to their original appearance by recreating grassed lawns, making the water garden easier to see.

== Description ==
=== House ===
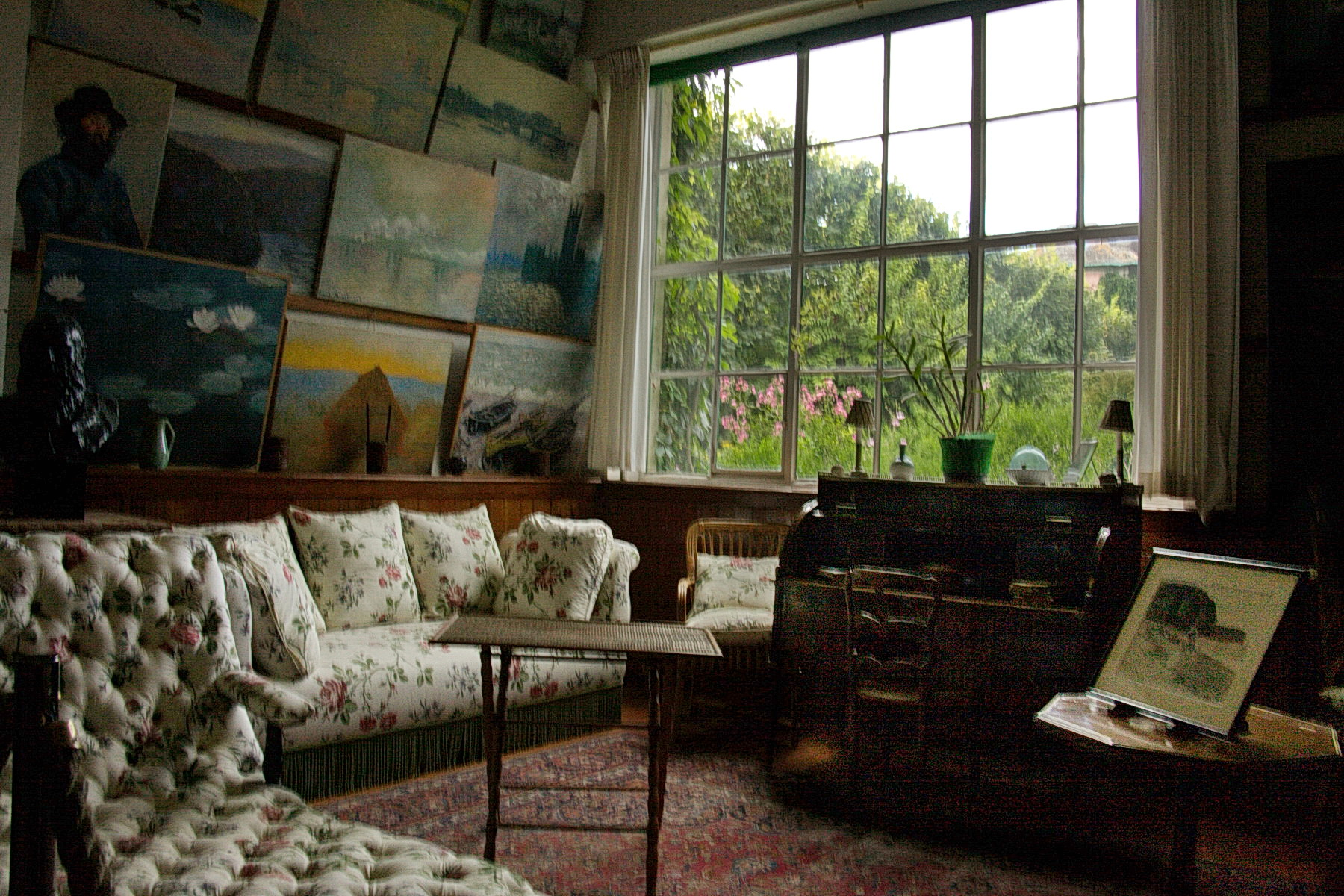
Interior

Visitors have access to:

- The ground floor: the blue salon (the reading room), the "épicerie" (the larder), the living room/studio, the dining room and the blue-tiled kitchen.
- The first floor: the family rooms, including Monet's, which was renovated in March 2013, as well as Alice Hoschedé's bedroom and their private apartments. Also visible is the room of Blanche Hoschedé, which was recreated in 2013 based on archives and existing elements present in the house.
- The studio next to the home, where Monet painted his large Water Lilies paintings and murals, including those exhibited in Paris' Musée de l'Orangerie. This studio is now the Foundation's gift shop.

=== Gardens ===
The garden is divided into two distinctive parts, which have been restored according to Monet's own specifications, the formal Clos Normand and the water garden with the water lilies pond and a Japanese bridge.

The Clos Normand was modelled after Monet's own artistic vision when he settled in Giverny. He spent years transforming the garden into a living en plein air painting, planting thousands of flowers in straight-lined patterns.

In 1893 Monet acquired a vacant piece of land across the road from the Clos Normand, which he then transformed into a water garden by diverting water from the stream Ru, an arm of the Epte river. That garden became famous during his lifetime with his series of monumental paintings of its water lilies, the Nymphéas. The water garden is marked by Monet's fascination with Japan, highlighted by its green Japanese bridge and oriental plants. The now famous water lilies were meticulously tended by a gardener employed for that sole purpose.

== Representations of the garden by Claude Monet ==
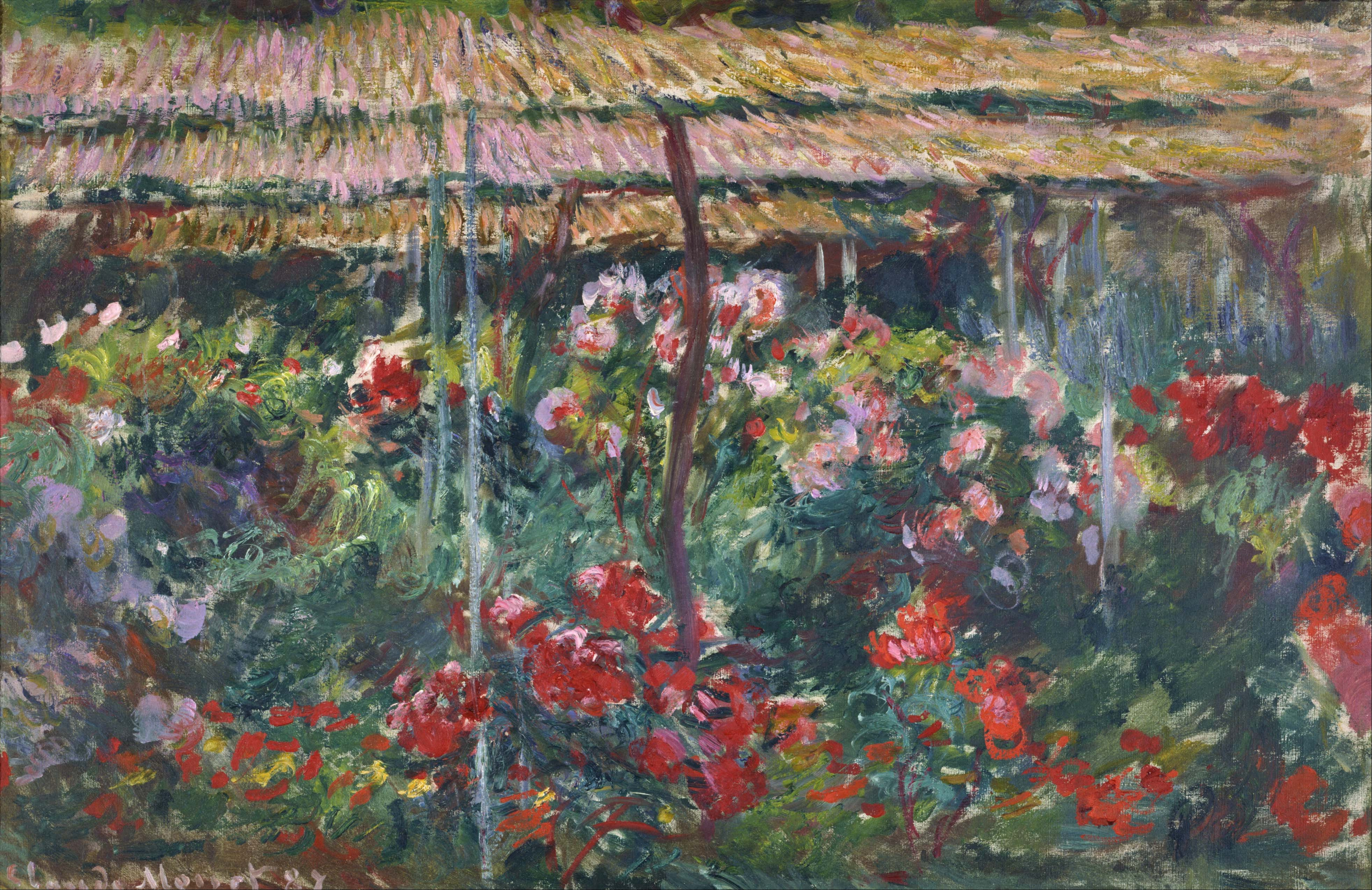
Jardin de pivoines, 1887, National Museum of Western Art (Tokyo)

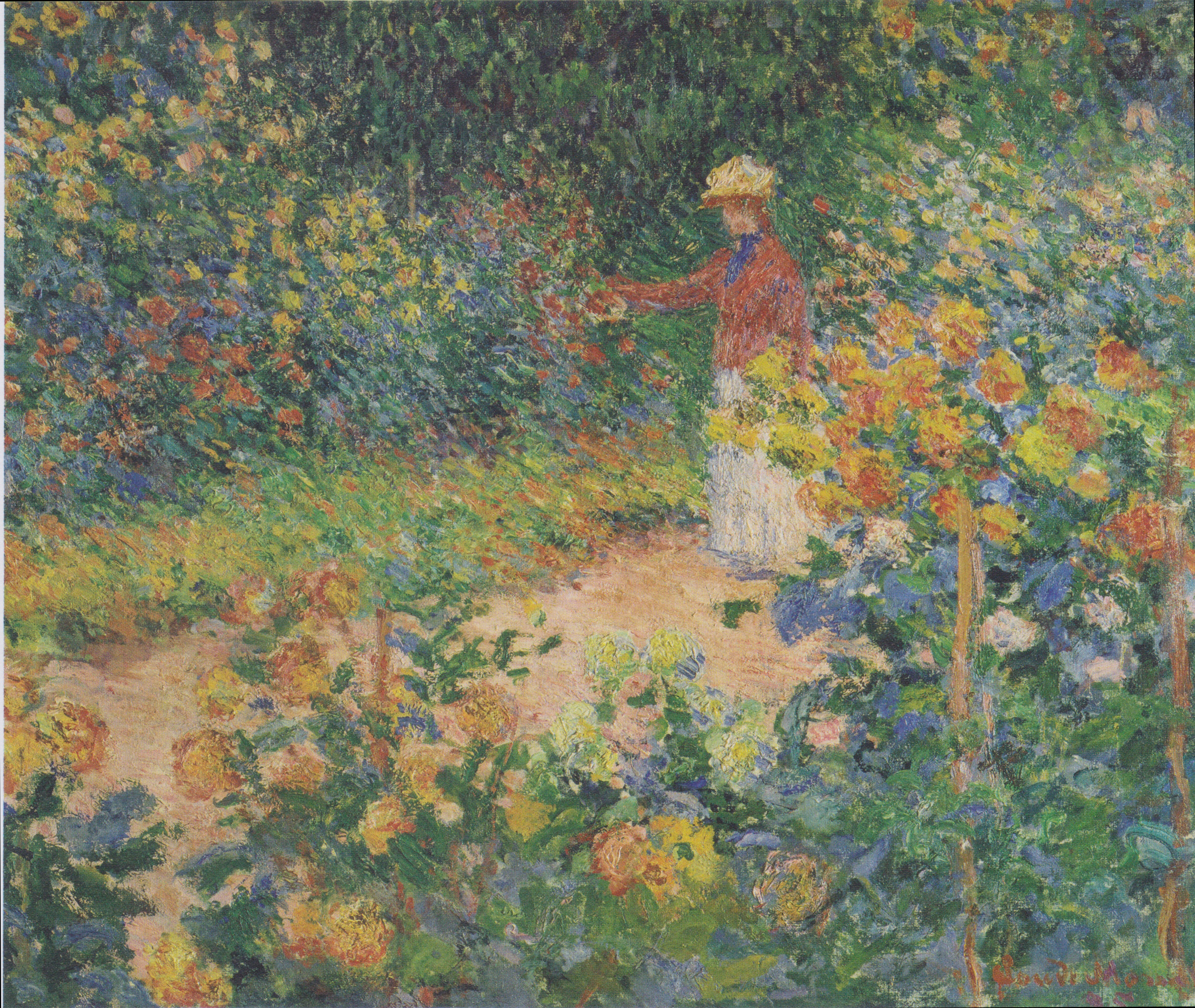
Dans le jardin, 1895, Fondation et Collection Emil G. Bührle (Zürich)

Water Lilies and the Japanese Bridge, 1897–1899, Princeton University Art Museum

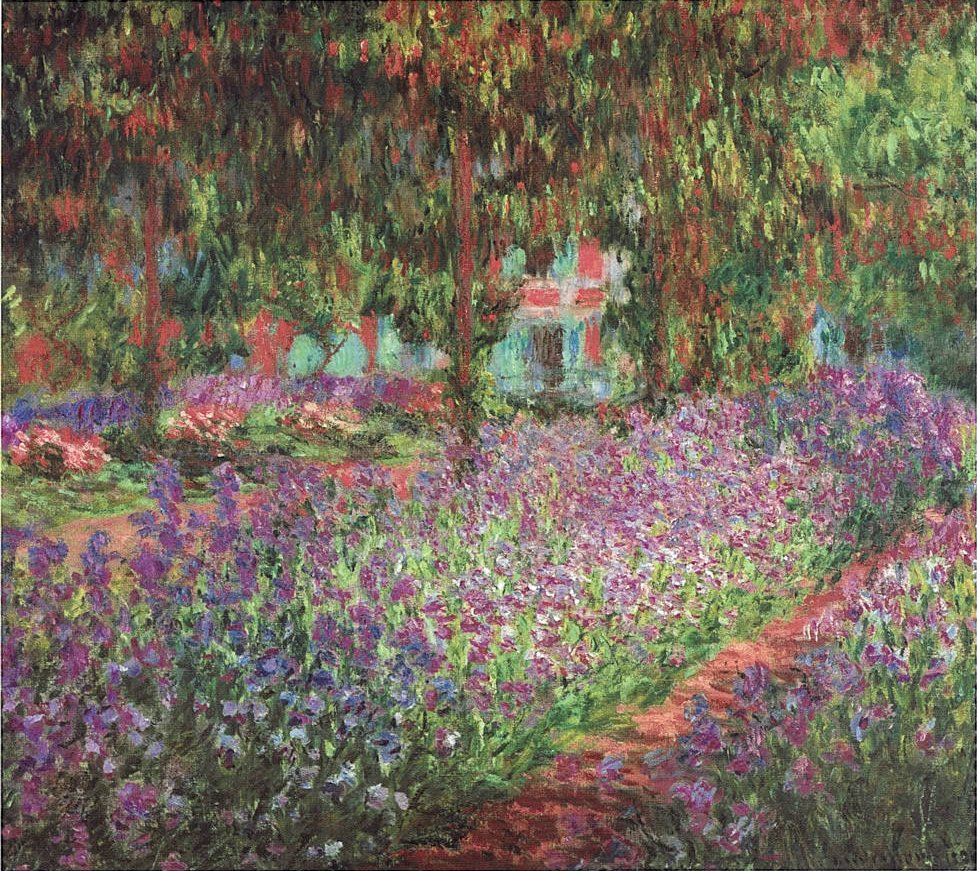
Le Jardin de l'artiste à Giverny, 1900, Musée d'Orsay, (Paris)

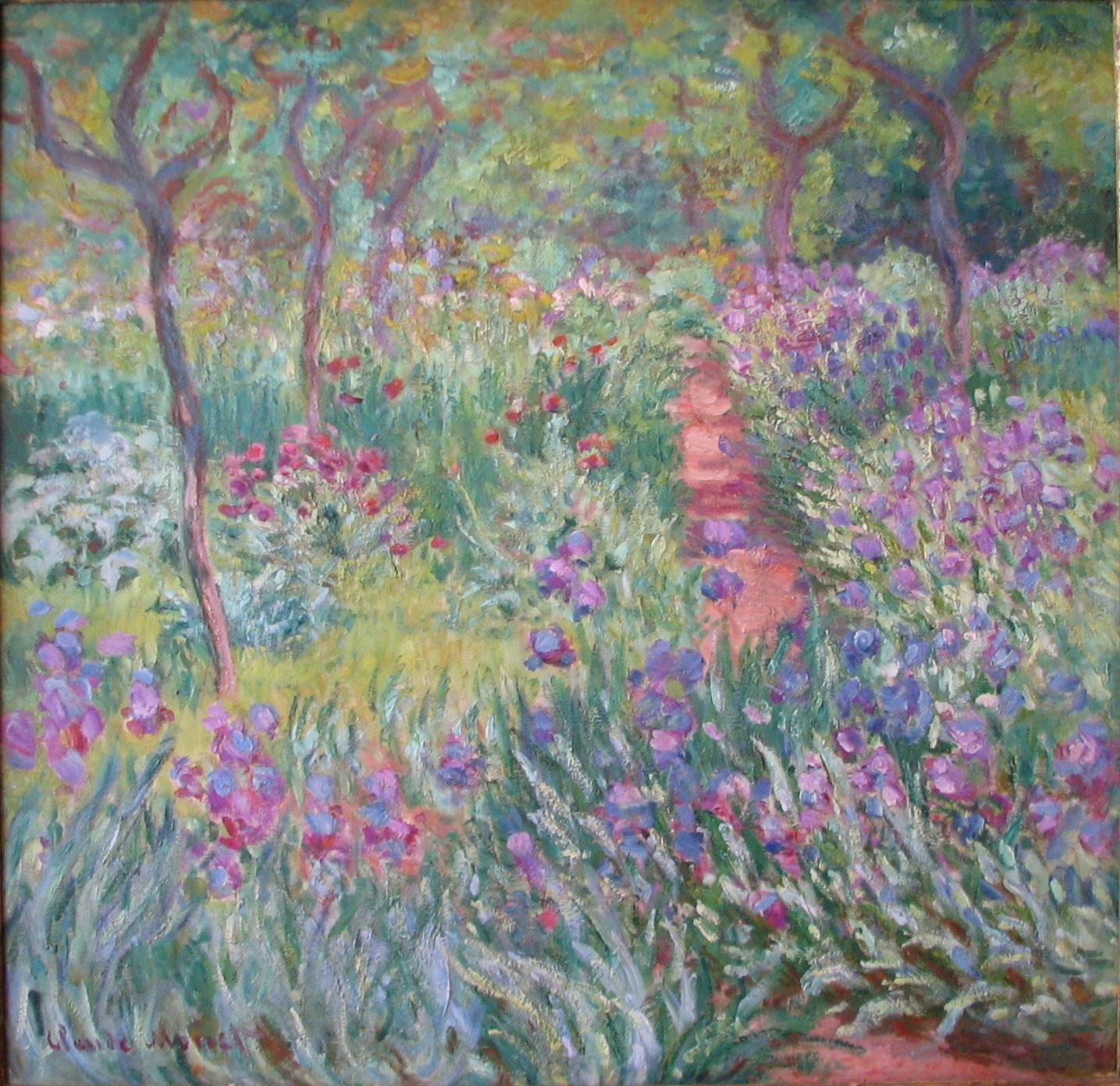
Le Jardin de l'artiste à Giverny, 1900, Yale University Art Gallery, (New Haven)

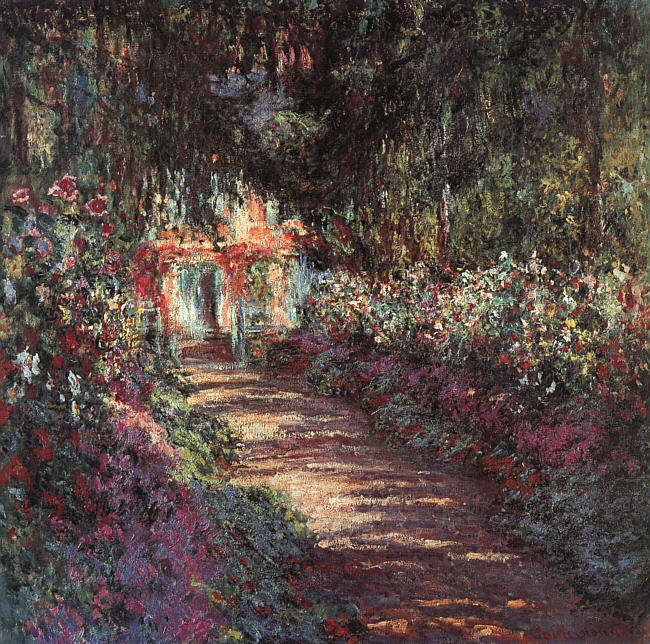
Le Jardin en fleurs, 1900

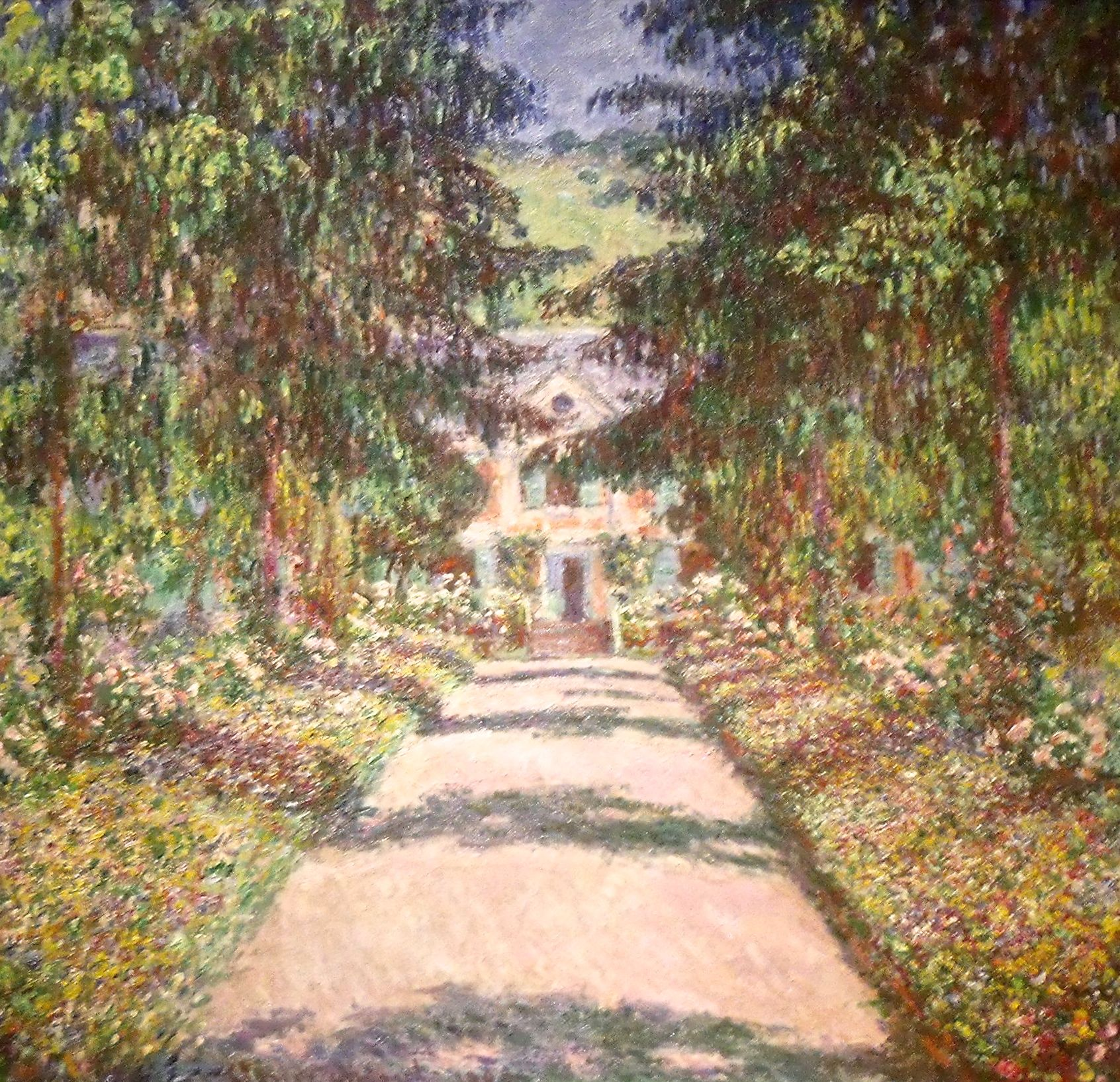
La Grande allée à Giverny, 1900, Musée des beaux-arts de Montréal

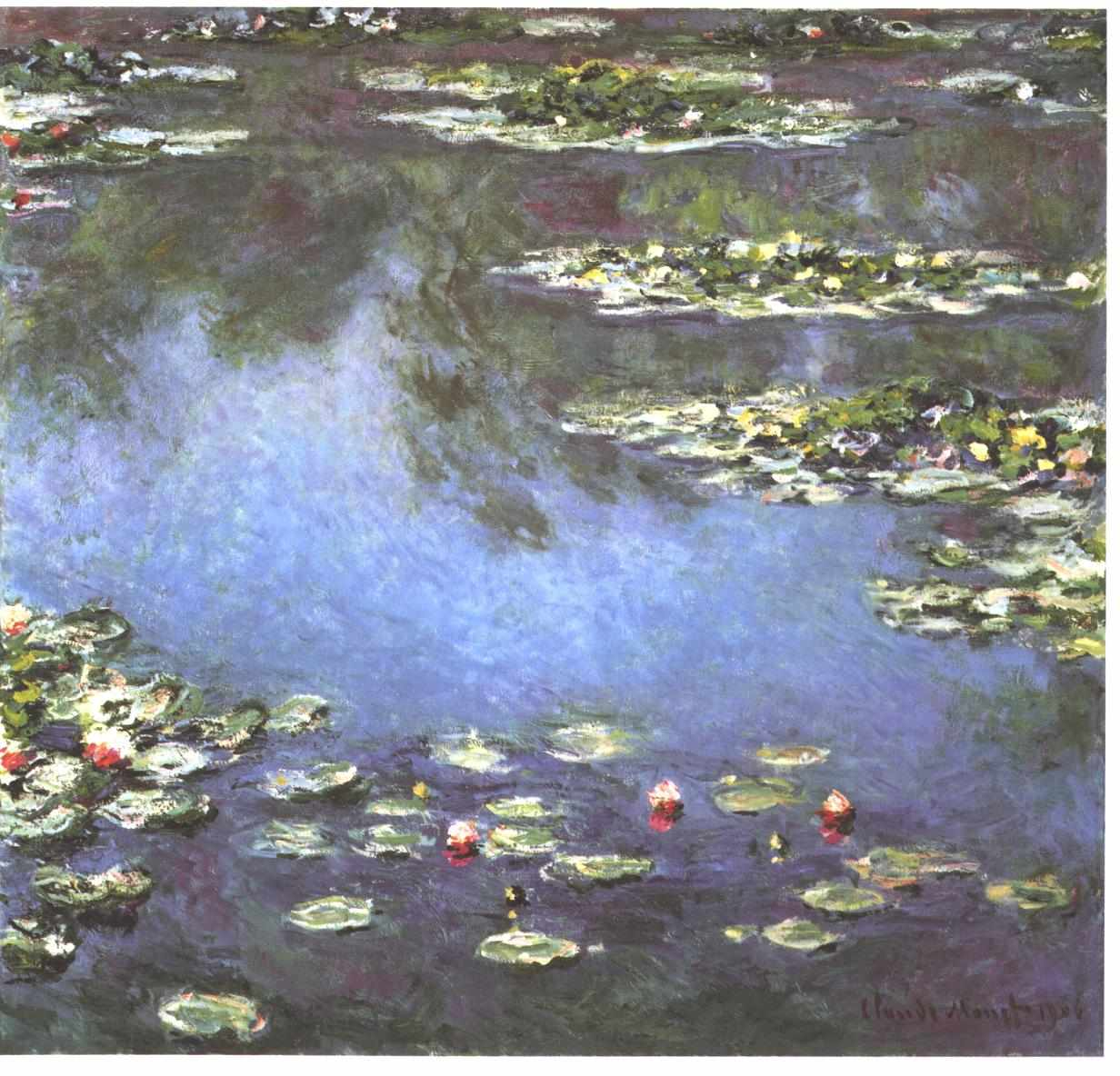
Water Lilies, 1906, Art Institute of Chicago

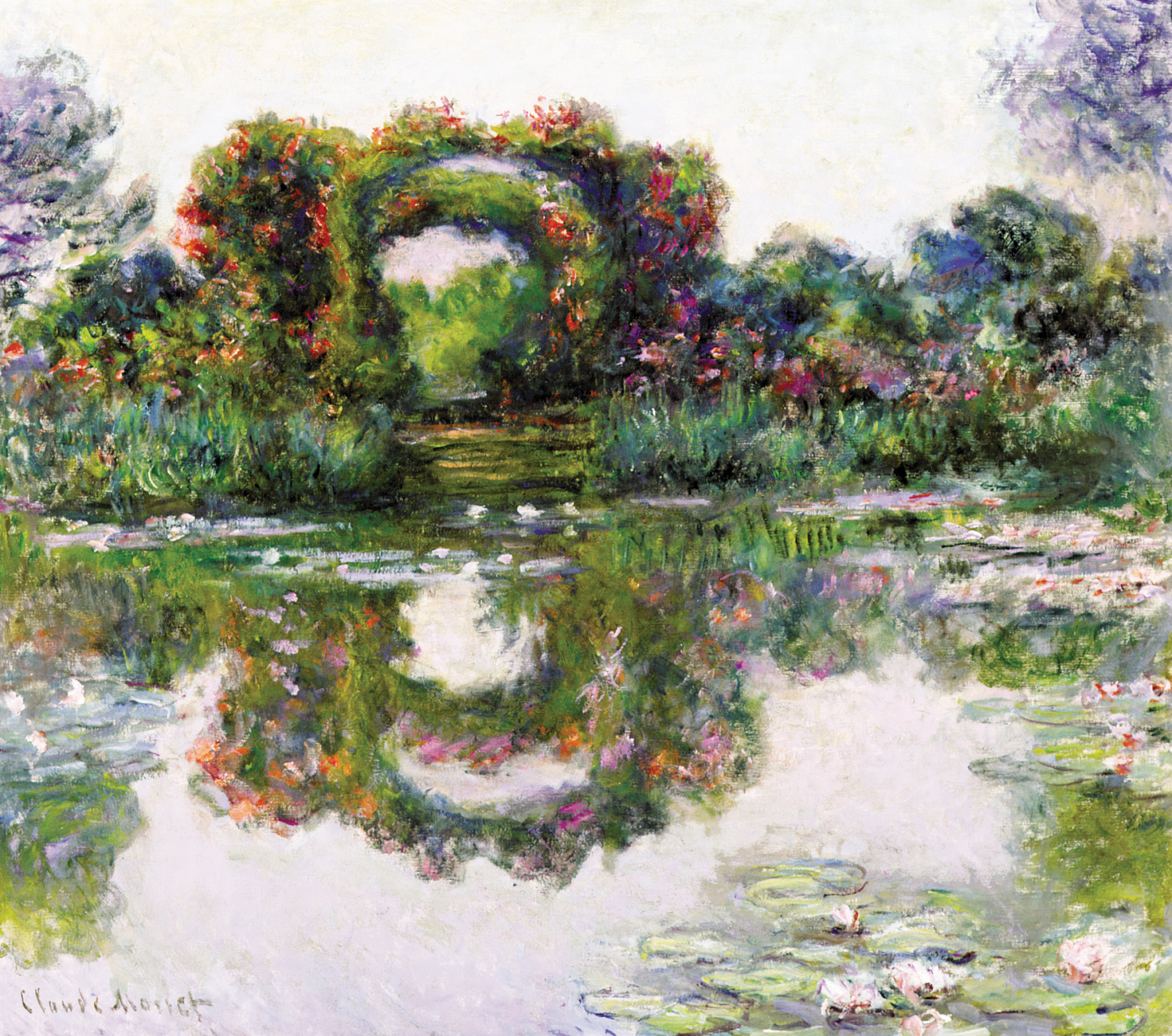
Les Arceaux fleuris, Giverny, 1913, Phoenix Art Museum, Phoenix

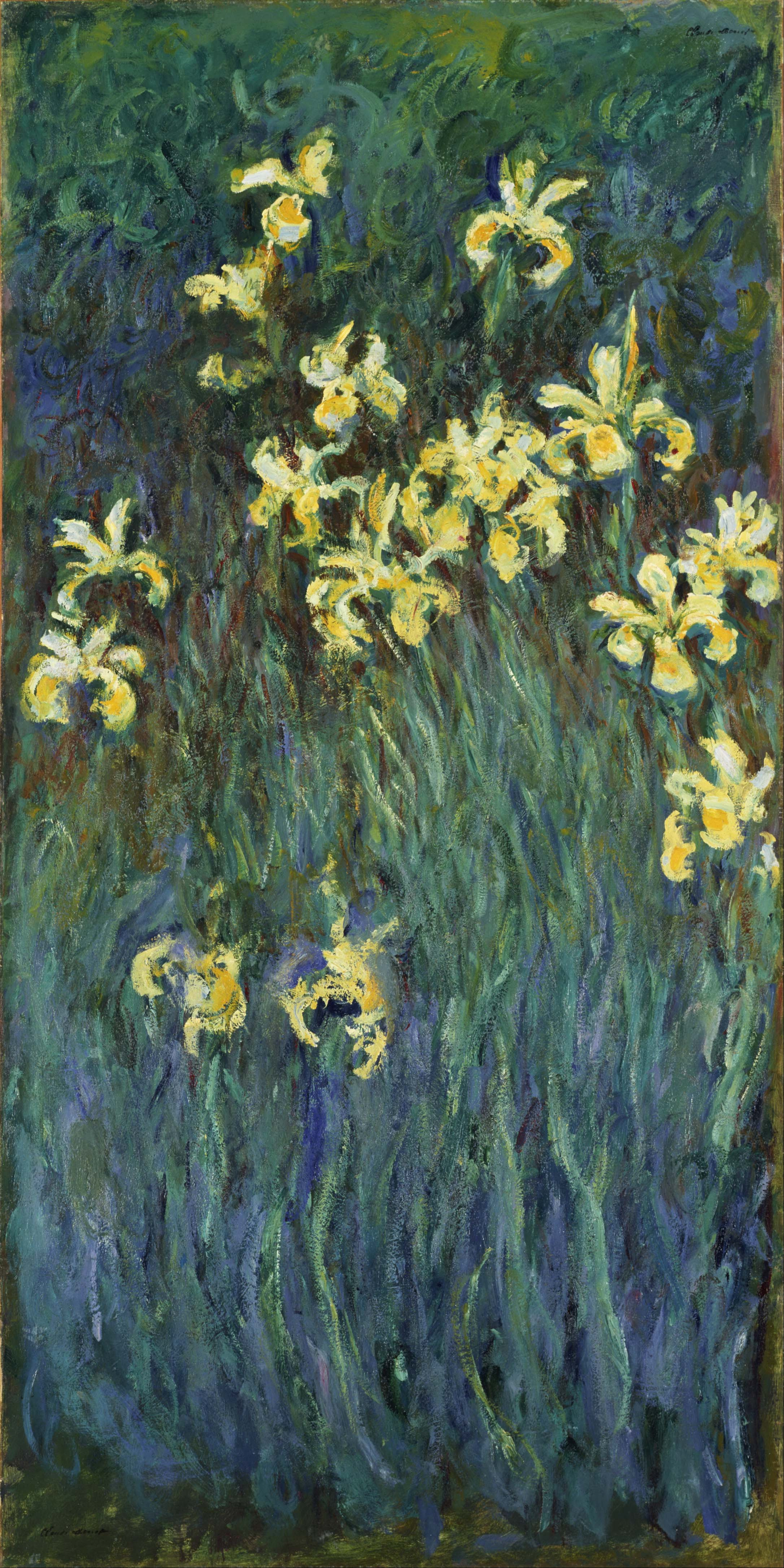
Iris jaunes, 1914, National Museum of Western Art (Tokyo)

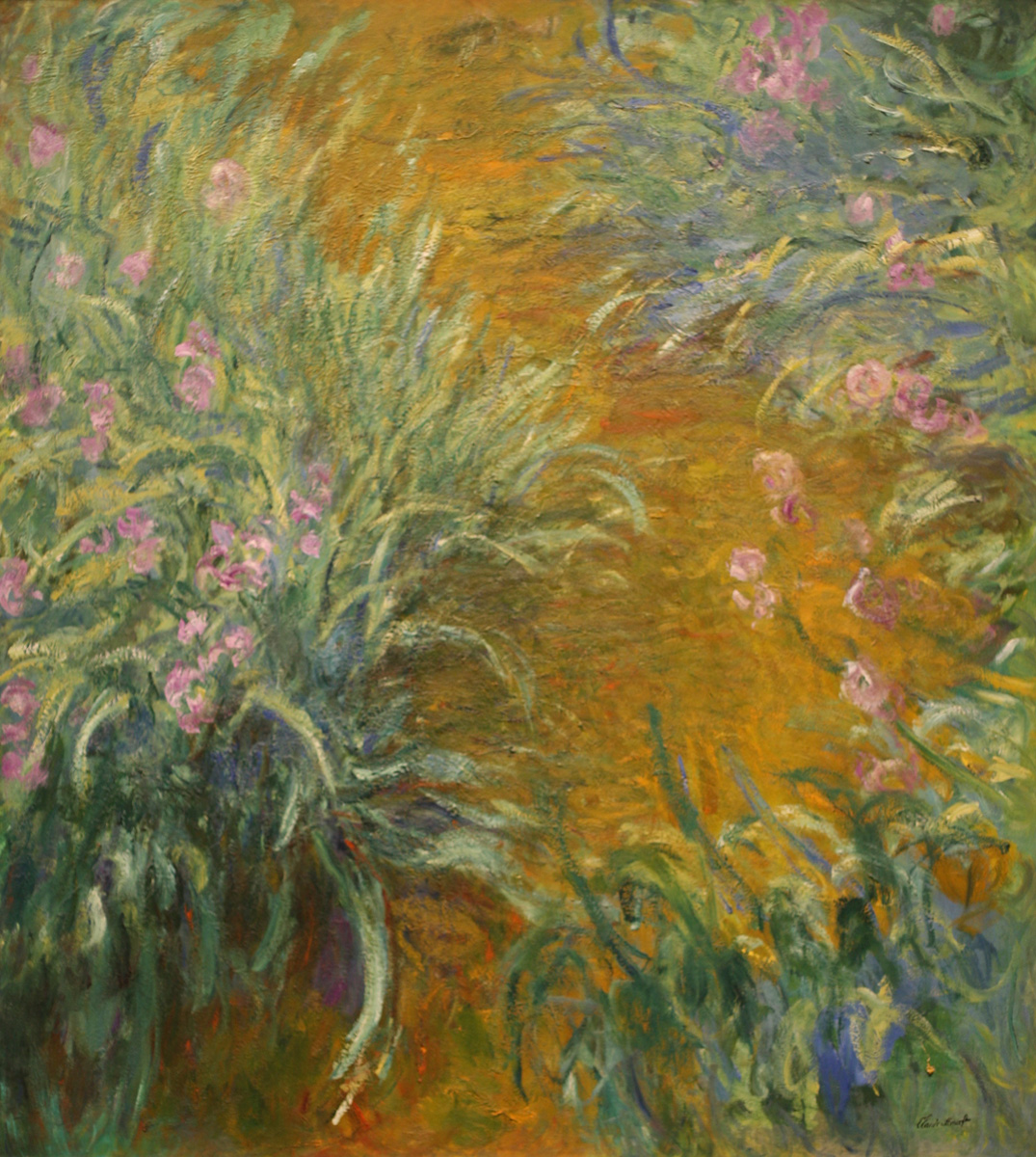
Le Chemin à travers les iris, 1914, Metropolitan Museum of Art (New York)

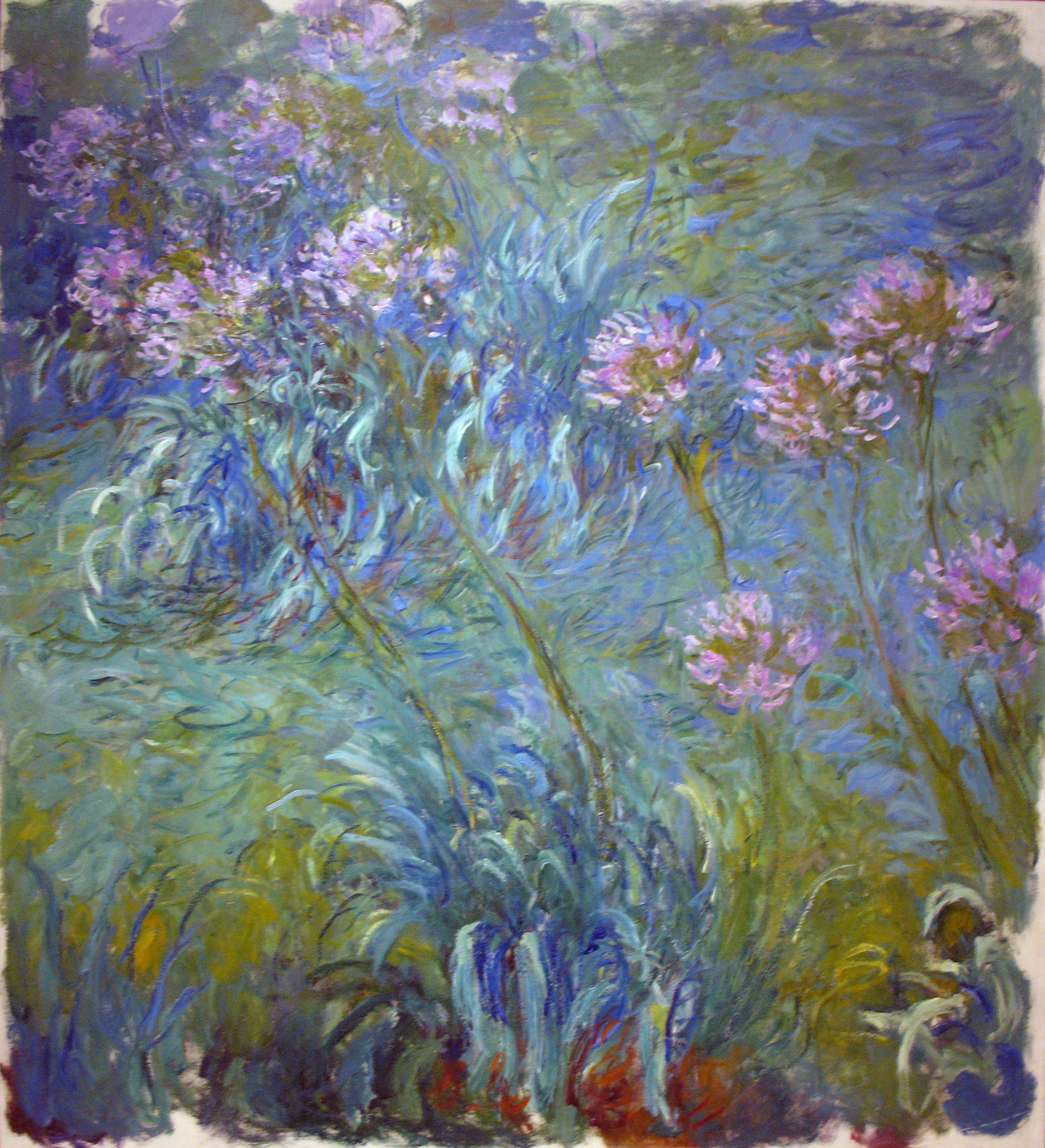
Les Agapanthes, 1914, Museum of Modern Art, (New York)

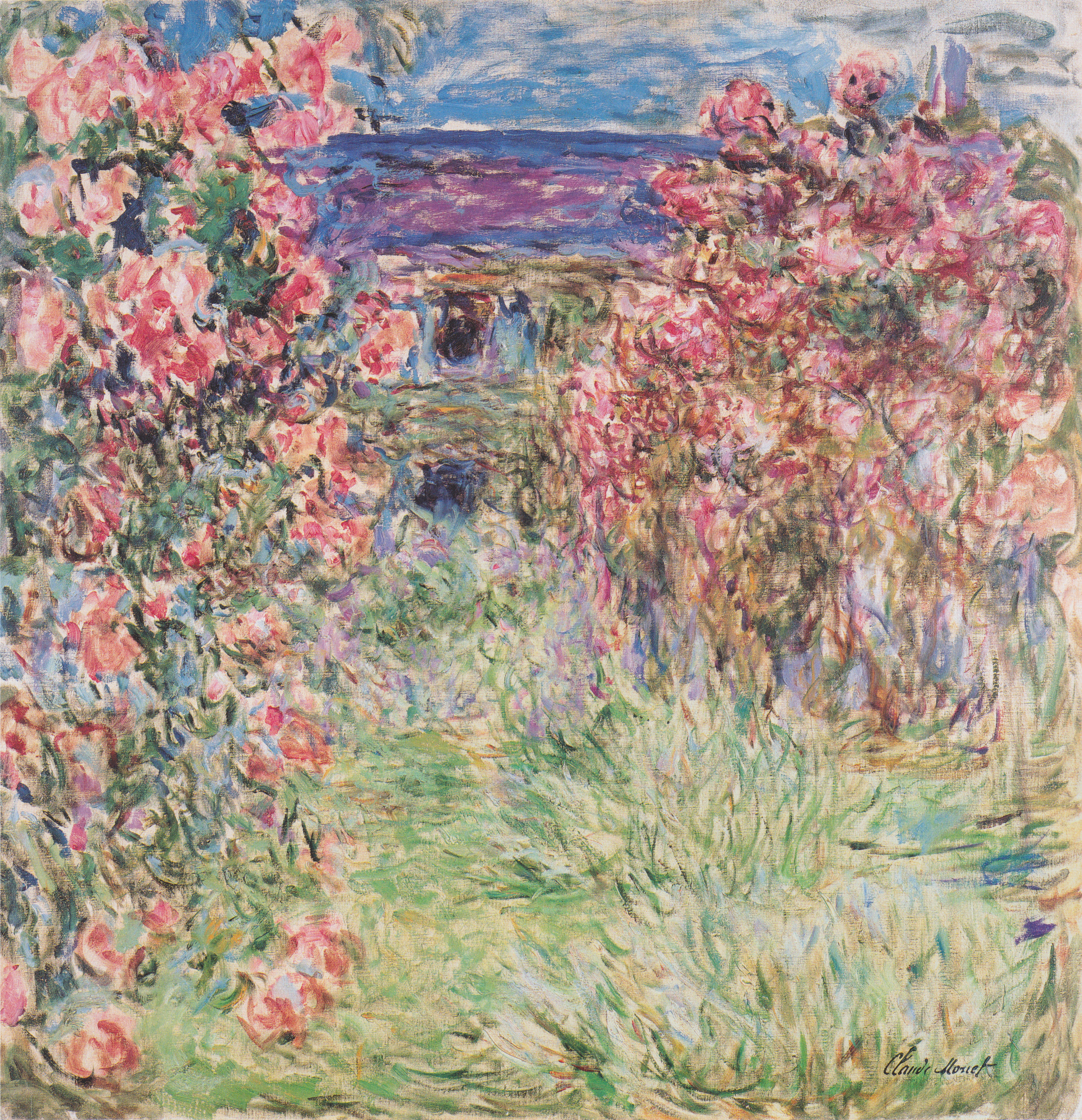
La Maison à travers les roses, 1917, Albertina, (Vienna)

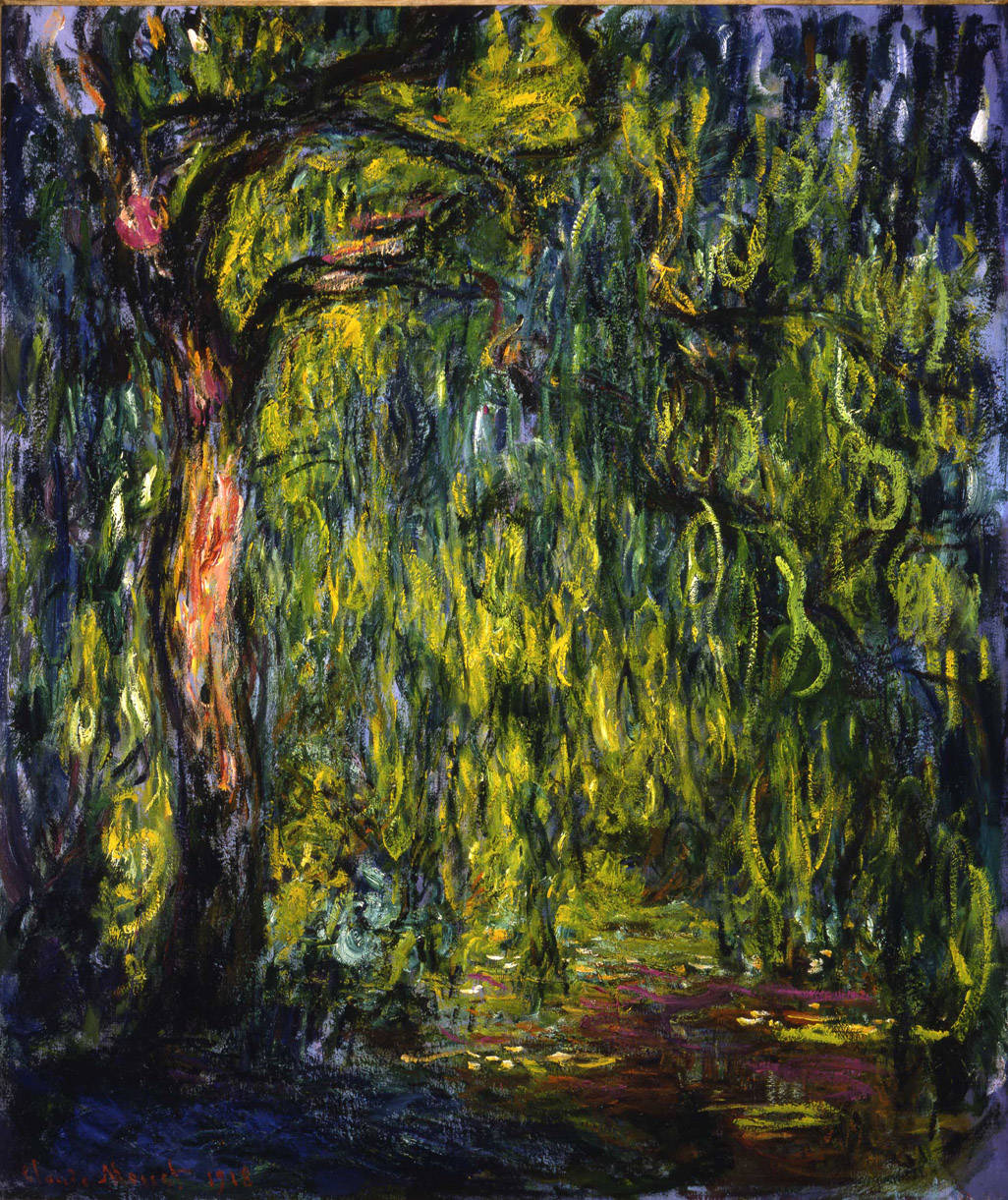
Weeping Willow, 1918, Columbus Museum of Art

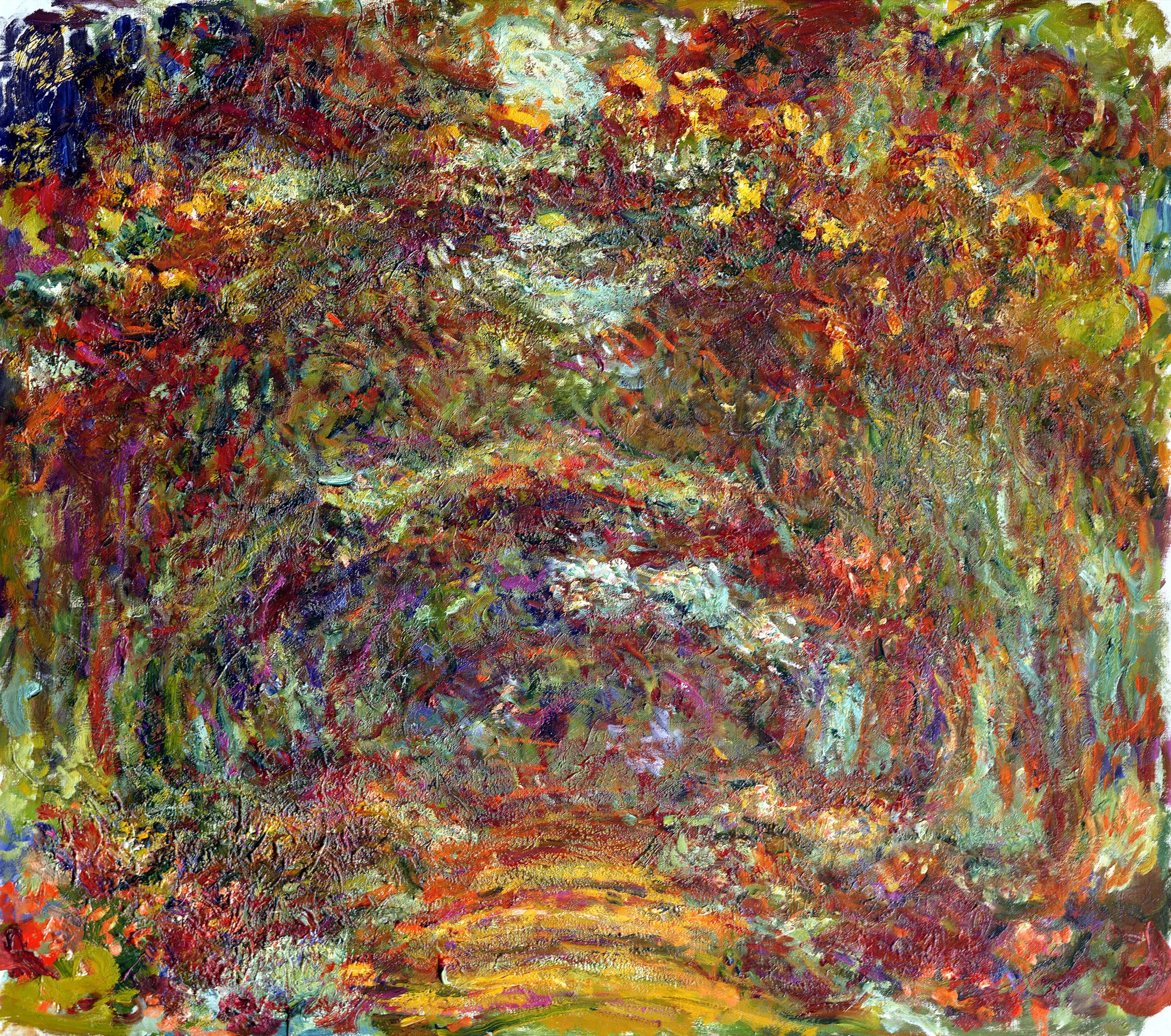
Le Chemin de roses à Giverny, 1920, Musée Marmottan (Paris)

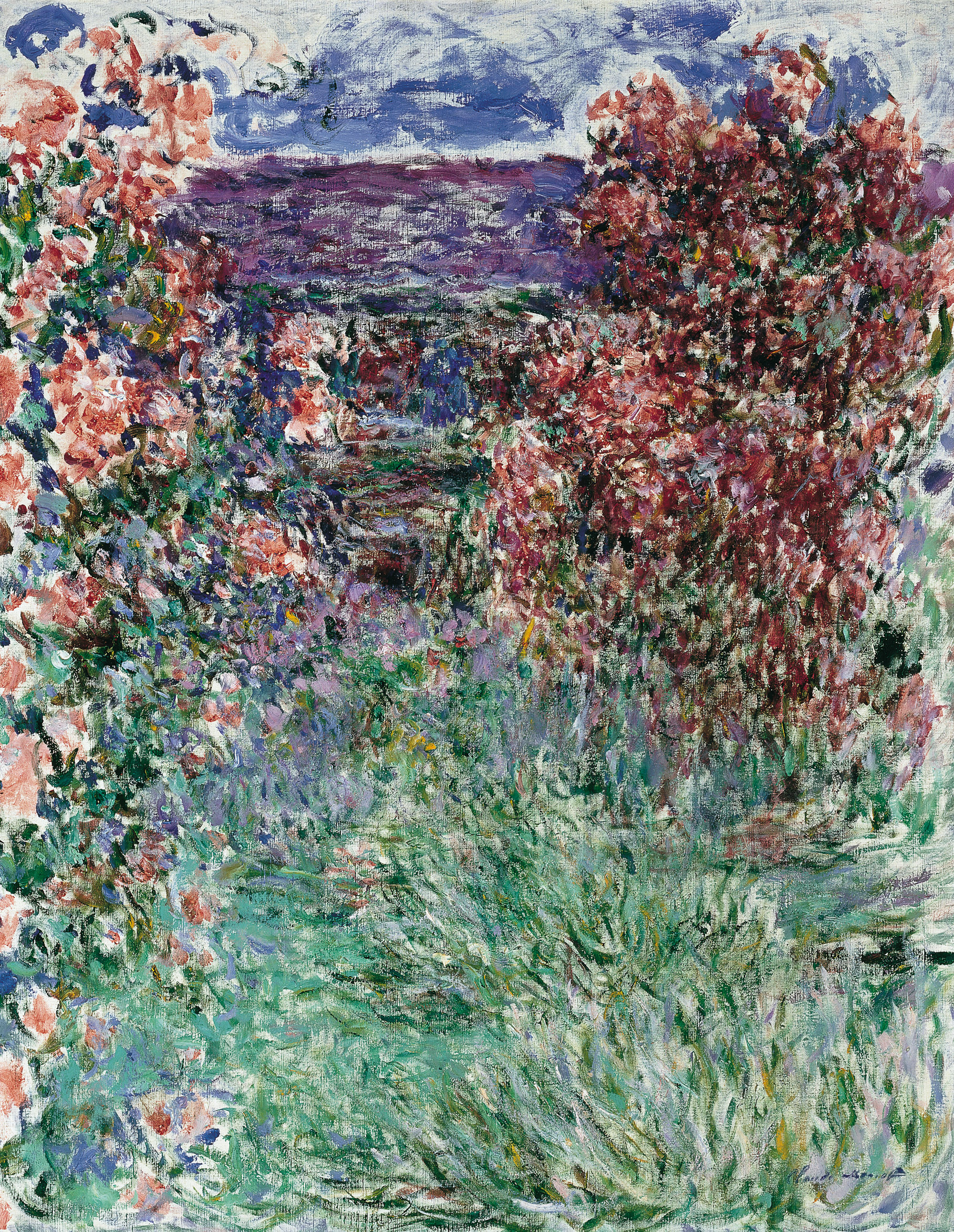
La Maison entre les roses, 1925, Thyssen-Bornemisza Museum (Madrid)

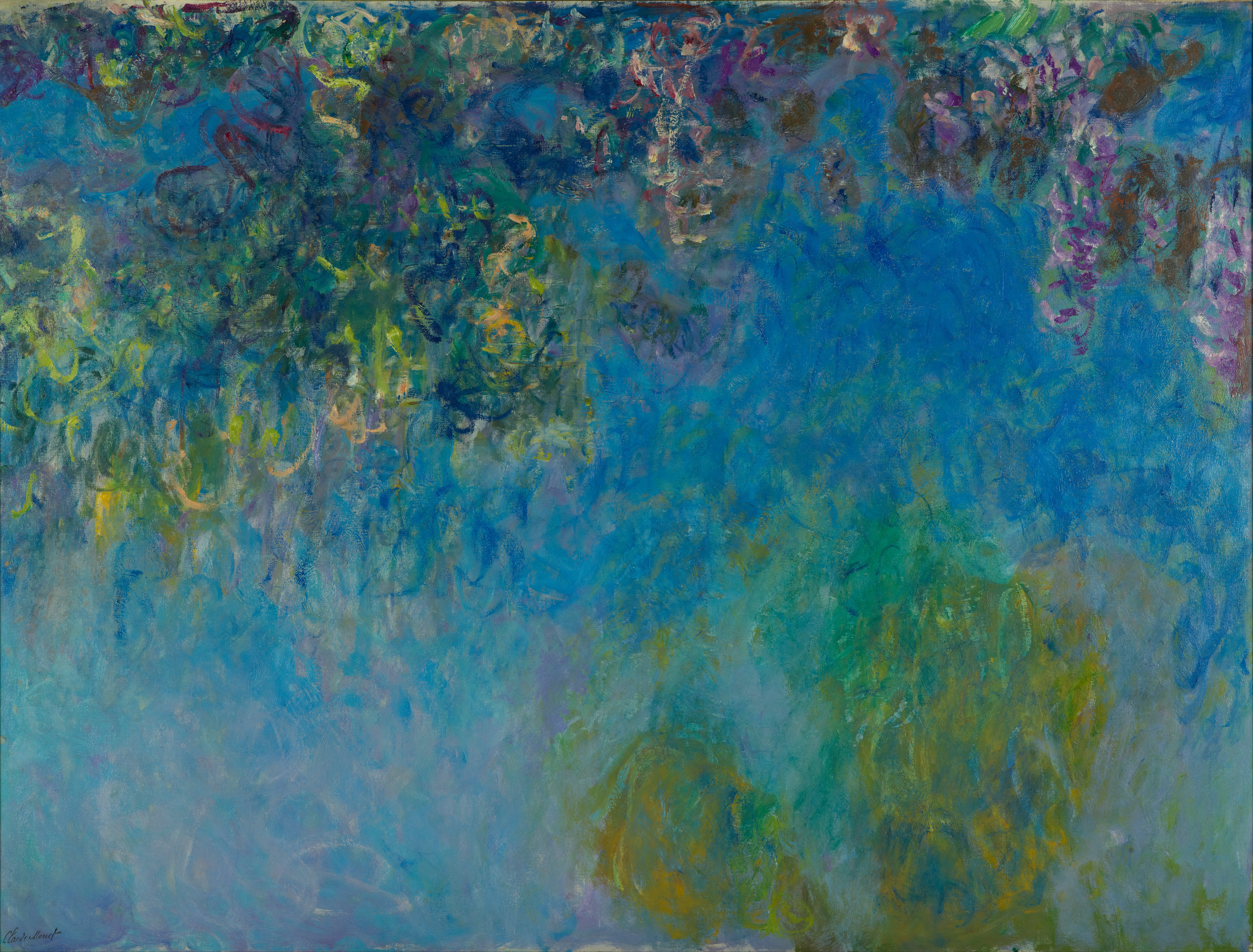
Glycine, 1925, Gemeentemuseum Den Haag (The Hague)

== The Japanese prints collection ==
The majority of Monet's work is housed at what is now the Musée Marmottan Monet. The house, however, houses 243 ukiyo-e prints from the 18th and 19th centuries, of which 211 are on display with the rest in storage. Monet's passion for Japanese prints dates back to his formative years in Le Havre and is evident in some of the aesthetic choices he made at Giverny, particularly in the Water Garden. The collection includes 46 prints by Kitagawa Utamaro, 23 by Katsushika Hokusai and 48 by Utagawa Hiroshige. Among the most famous prints are Hokusai's The Great Wave off Kanagawa and one of Mount Fuji.

== In popular culture ==
Sacha Guitry’s 1929 play Histoires de France had a scene featuring an elderly Monet and Georges Clemenceau (set in the garden at Giverny).

Much of the 2006 BBC docudrama The Impressionists, which is told from Claude Monet's viewpoint, was filmed at the home, gardens, and pond.

Scenes from Woody Allen's film Midnight in Paris were filmed there on 6 August 2010.

Artist E.V. Day's 2010 Versailles Foundation Munn Artists Program residency at Giverny artist resulted in two solo shows. One was “Seducers” at Carolina Nitsch Contemporary Gallery, where she presented high-resolution scans of the reproductive organs of flowers. The other in 2012 at The Hole Gallery in New York, featured a recreation of Monet's garden with living plants and a small wooden bridge arching over lily pond highlighting photographs that Day had created of interdisciplinary artist Kembra Pfahler as her character "The Voluptuous Horror of Karen Black" posing on hot pink amidst the tranquility of the garden.

The garden was also the setting for Cédric Klapisch's film Colours of Time in 2024.

== See also ==
- Musée Marmottan Monet, Paris
- List of single-artist museums

== Bibliography ==
- Hélène Rochette, Maisons d'écrivains et d'artistes. Paris et ses alentours, pp. 224–229, Parigramme, Paris, 2004, ISBN 2-84096-227-6
- Houston, Joe; Vasseur, Dominique H.; Wolfe, M. Melissa; Stuckey, Charles F.; Yood, James (2007). In Monet's Garden: Artists and the Lure of Giverny (Softcover). New York, Paris, London: Columbus Museum of Art, Musee Marmottan-Monet, Scala Publishers. ISBN 978-1-85759-500-0.
- Mathieu, Marianne (2013). Monet's Garden: The Musee Marmolton Monet, Paris (Softcover). Melbourne: National Gallery of Victoria. ISBN 9780724103706.
- Stuckey, Charles F. (1995). Claude Monet: 1840-1926 (Hardcover). Chicago, London: The Art Institute of Chicago, Thames and Hudson. ISBN 0-500-09246-X.
- Wullschläger, Jackie (2023). Monet: The Restless Vision (Hardcover). London: Allen Lane. ISBN 978-0-241-18830-9.
