= Weeping Willow (Monet) =

1918 oil painting by Oscar-Claude Monet

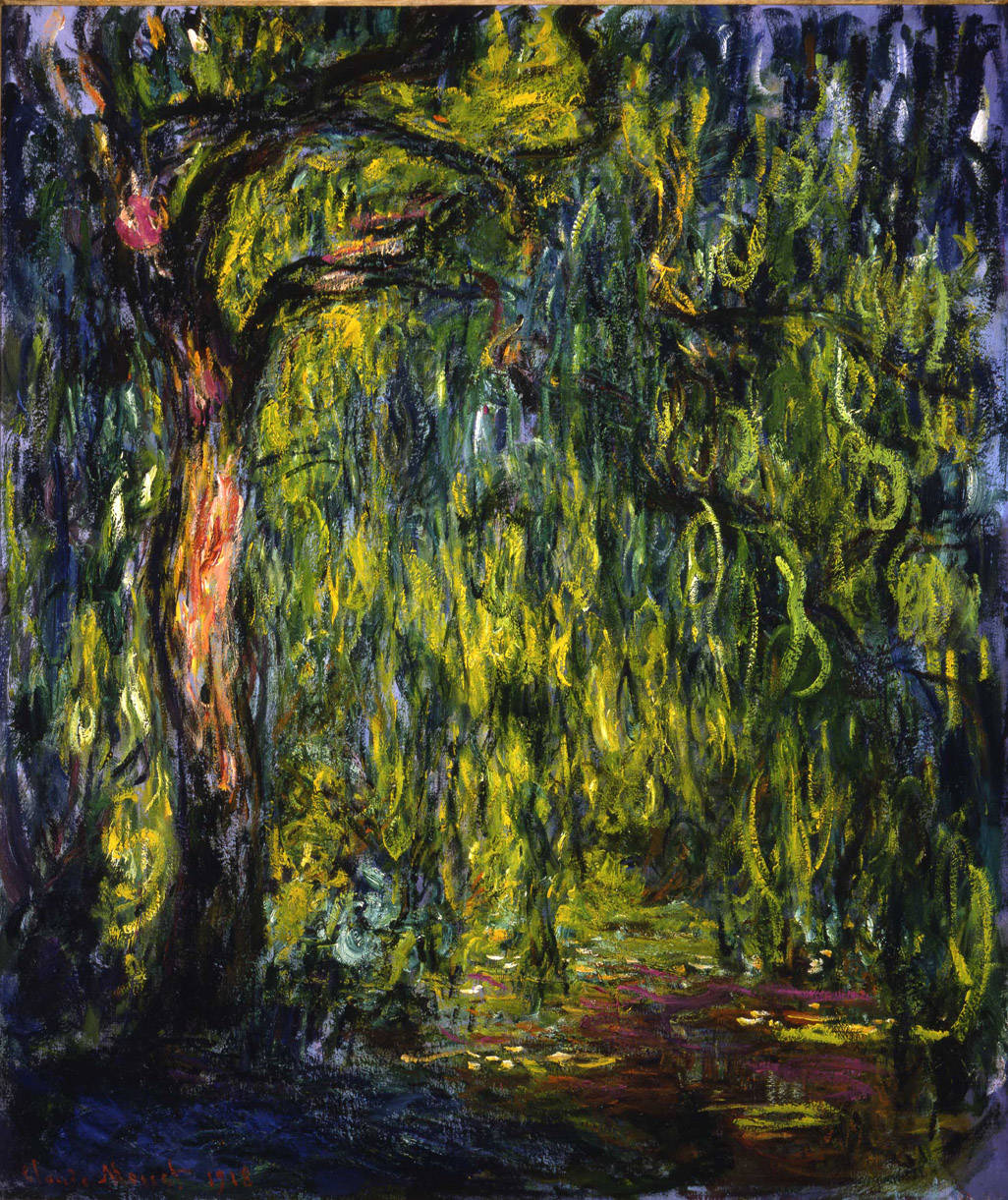
- Artist: Claude Monet
- Year: 1918
- Medium: oil on canvas
- Dimensions: 131 cm × 110.3 cm (52 in × 43.4 in)
- Location: Columbus Museum of Art; Columbus (Ohio)

Weeping Willow is a 1918 oil painting by Claude Monet which depicts a weeping willow tree growing at the edge of his water garden pond in Giverny, France. It is exhibited at the Columbus Museum of Art in Columbus, Ohio.

The painting is one of a series of Monet paintings of this weeping willow. It is 131 by 110.3 cm (51.6 × 43.5 in.), and was a gift to the museum by Howard and Babette Sirak.

== Monet's Weeping Willow paintings ==
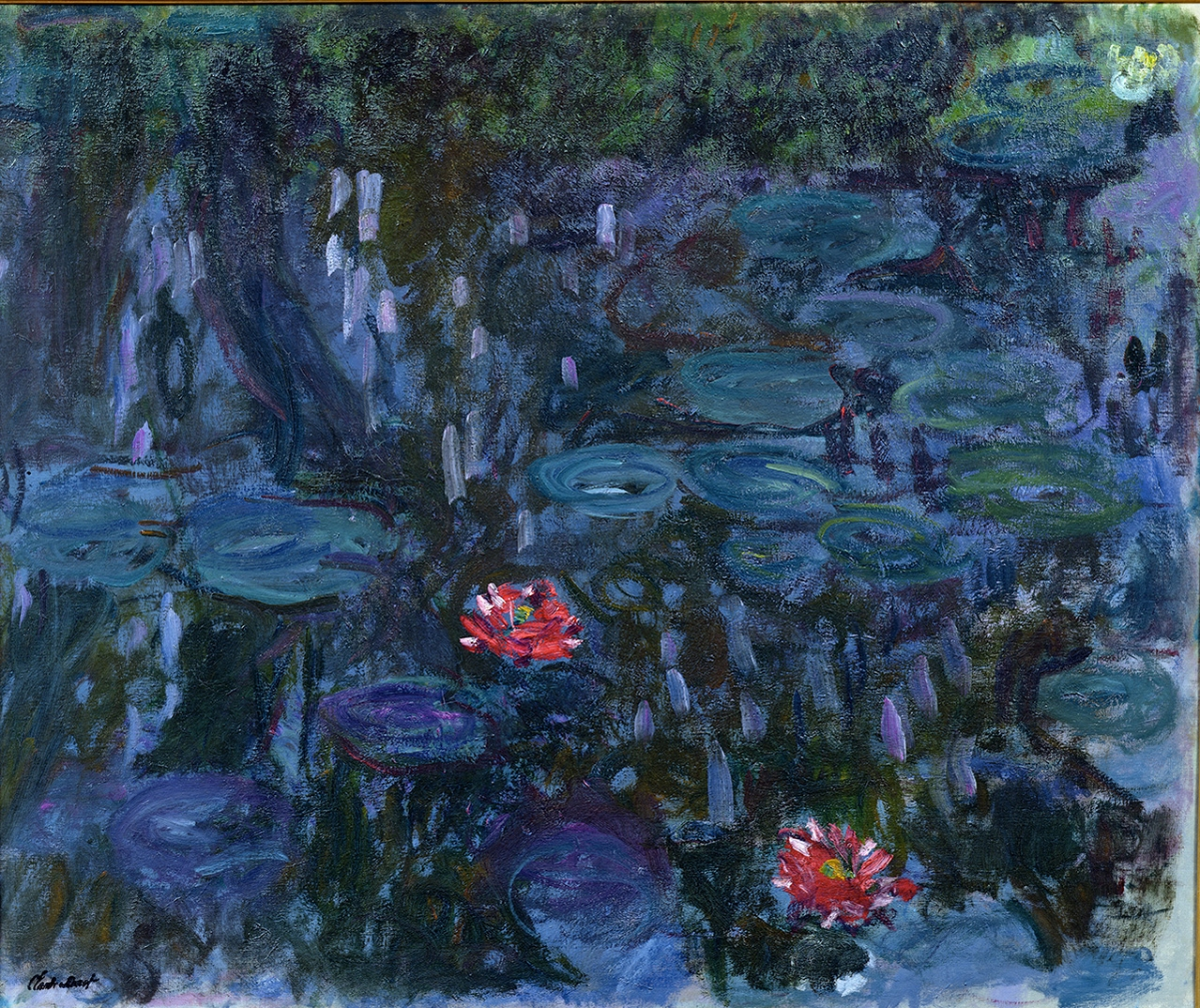
Water Lilies and Reflections of a Willow (1916–1919), Musée Marmottan Monet

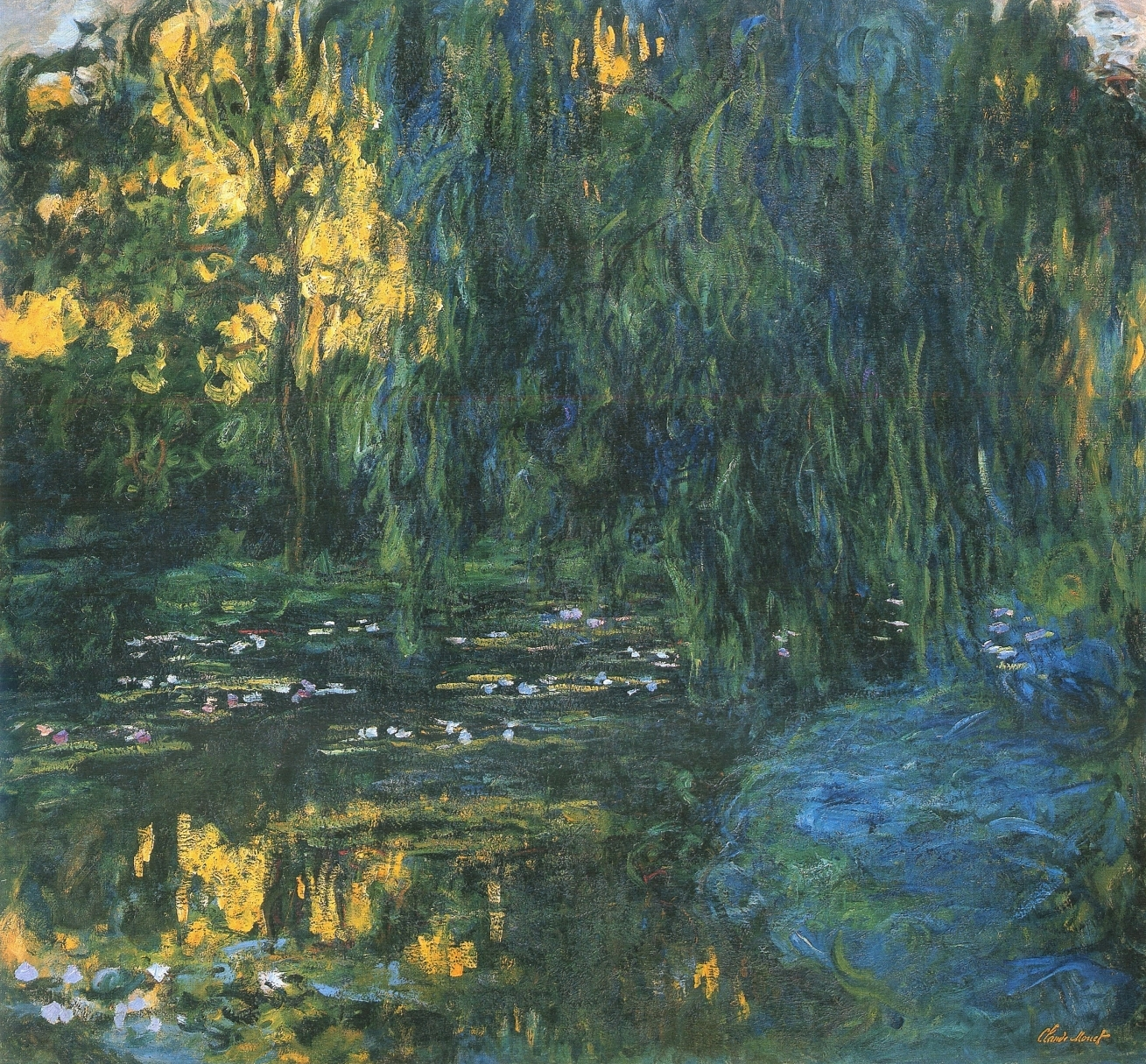
Water-Lily Pond and Weeping Willow, 1916–1919, Sale Christie's New York, 1998

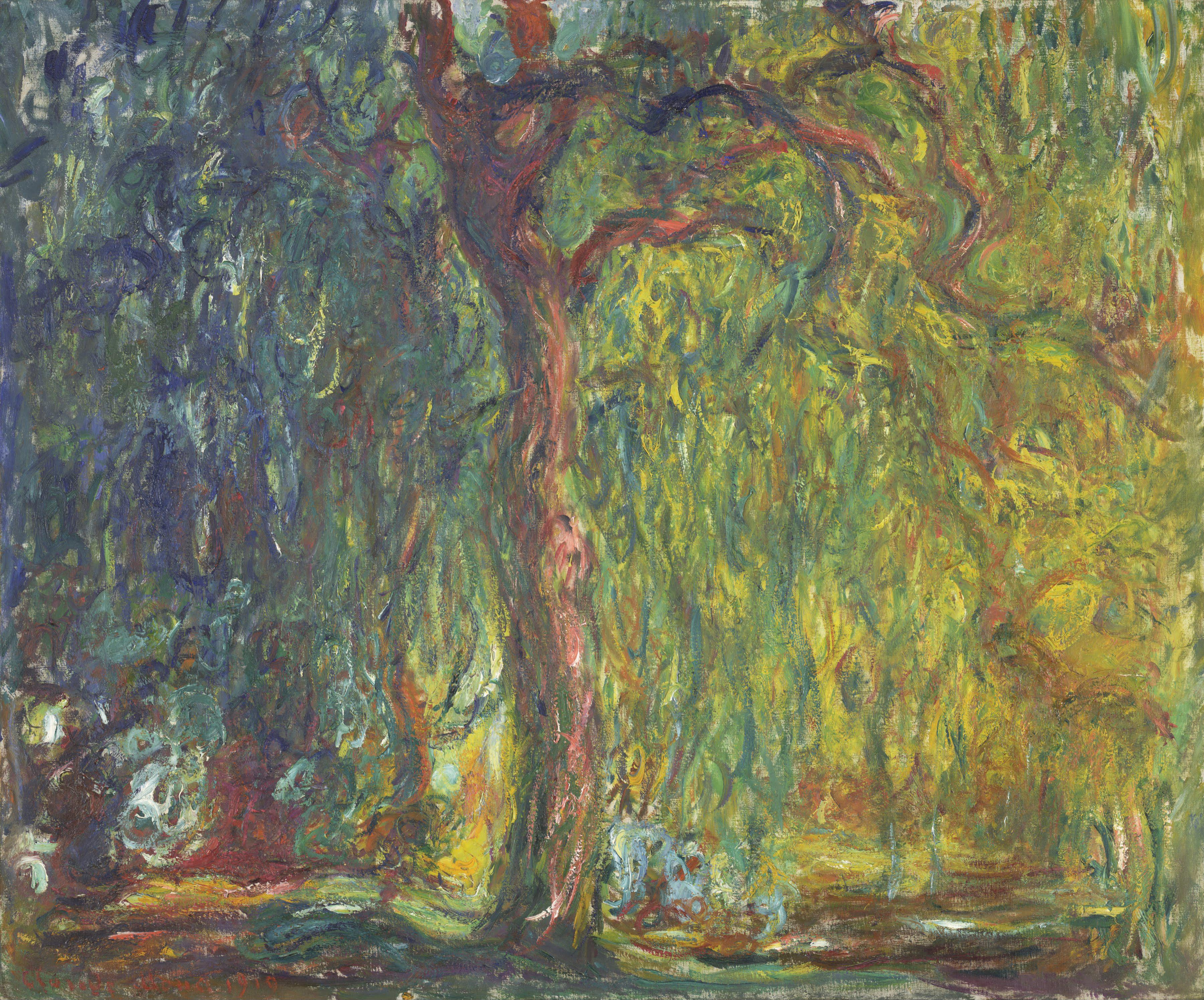
Weeping Willow, 1918–1919, Kimbell Art Museum, Fort Worth

== See also ==
- List of paintings by Claude Monet
- Water Lilies, Monet's large series of paintings of water lilies in the pond shown in the image, which is adjacent to where the depicted Weeping Willow grew.
