= The Artist's Garden at Giverny =

1900 painting by Claude Monet

Le Jardin de l'artiste à Giverny
- The Artist's Garden at Giverny (English)
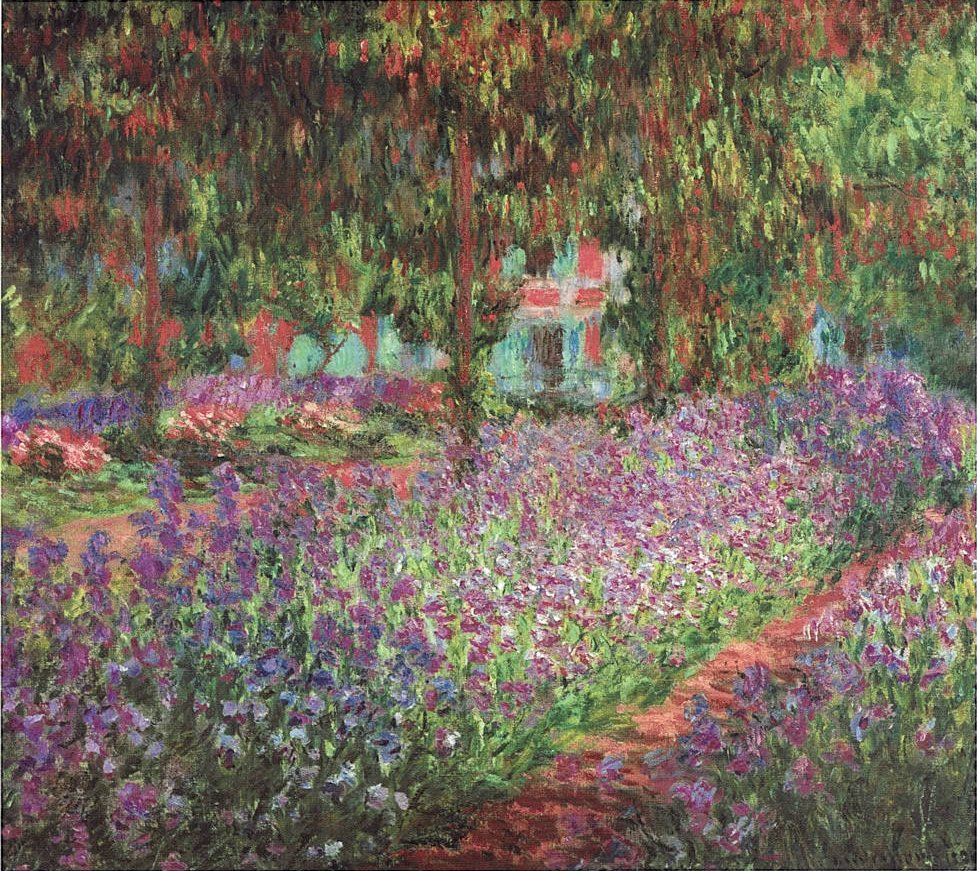
- Artist: Claude Monet
- Year: 1900
- Medium: Oil on canvas
- Dimensions: 89 cm × 92.1 cm (35 in × 36.3 in)
- Location: Musée d'Orsay; Paris

The Artist's Garden at Giverny (French: Le Jardin de l'artiste à Giverny) is an oil on canvas painting by Claude Monet done in 1900, now in the Musée d'Orsay, Paris.

It is one of many works by the artist of his garden at Giverny over the last thirty years of his life. The painting shows rows of irises in various shades of purple and pink set diagonally across the picture plane. The flowers are under trees that in allowing dappled light through change the tone of their colours. Beyond the trees is a glimpse of Monet's house.

== In the context of Monet's oeuvre ==
Monet was 60 years old the year he completed this painting, and had produced an immense body of work. He had become extraordinarily successful as well as famous. By this time, he was analysing what he saw more and more until, according to William Seitz, "subject, sensation and pictorial object have all but become identical".

In 1900, the year of this painting, he embarked on two major projects—a series of the River Thames in London and another series of his water gardens in Giverny, including some of his famous paintings of waterlilies, such as The Waterlily Pond (now in the Museum of Fine Arts Boston).

His dealer Durand-Ruel exhibited recent works, including a dozen Waterlilies and he bought his friend Renoir's painting Mosque (Arabian Festival).

== The garden ==
Monet worked on and developed the garden that is the subject of the painting from the end of 1883 until the end of his life.

It was essentially a garden of perennials, highlighted by annuals. Monet established a number of basic principles to which he always adhered: bare earth was anathema to him; he avoided dark flowers; conversely, he could never get enough of blue ... he abhored single flowers, permitting double blooms only in roses and herbaceous peonies; and he loathed variegated foliage.

Flowers planted and painted by Monet in his garden at Giverny
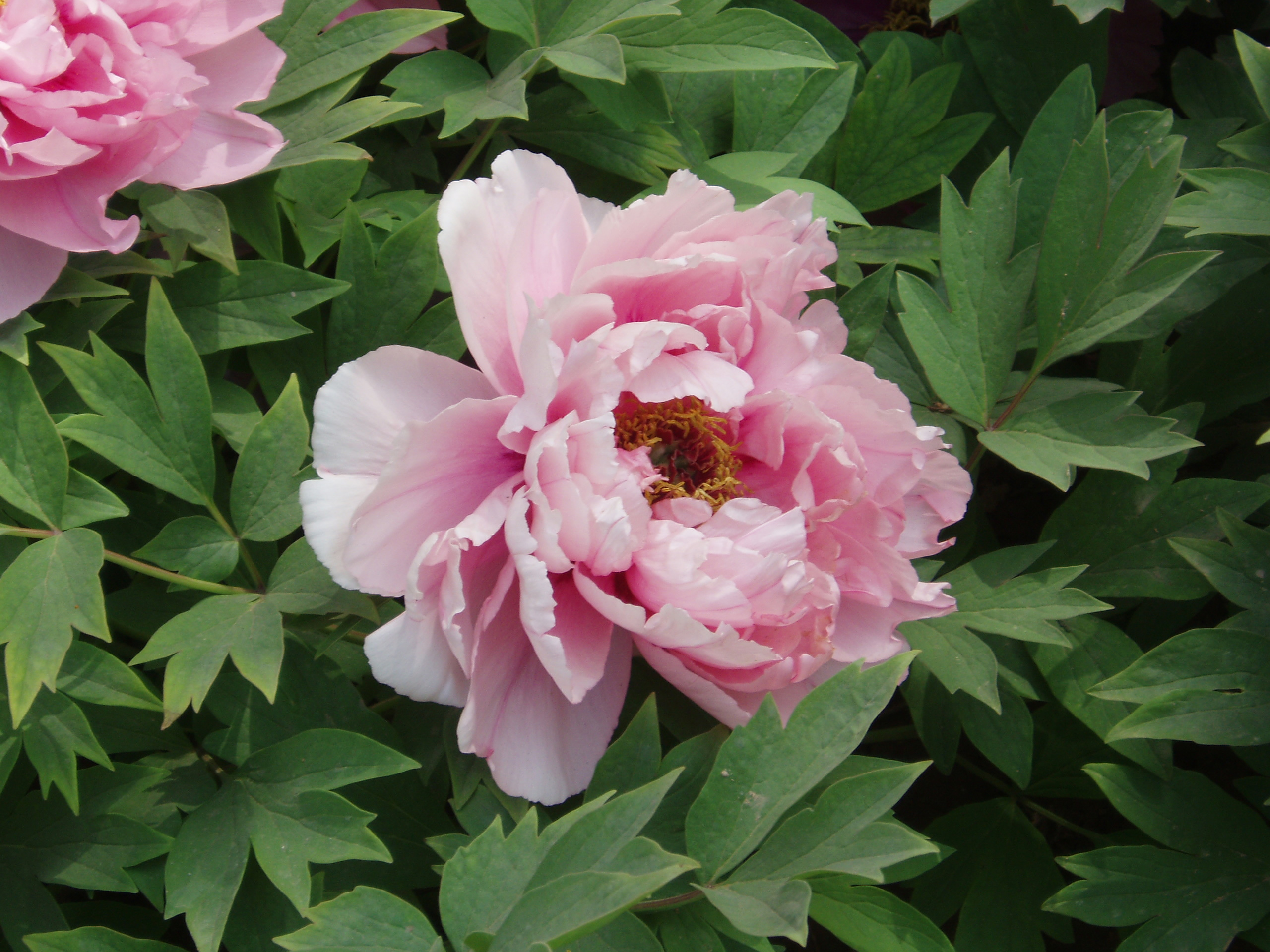
A tree peony (Paeonia suffruticosa)

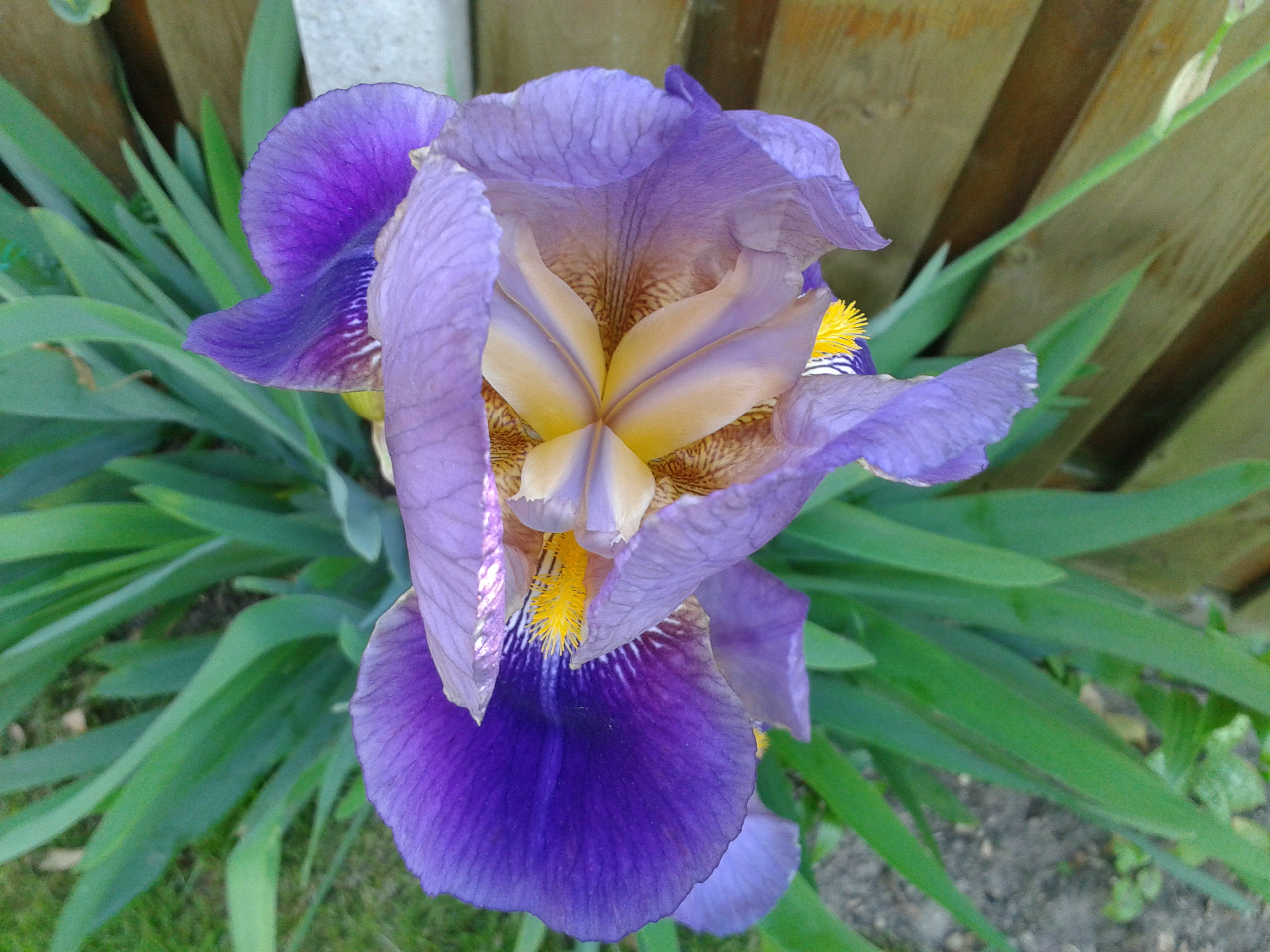
Iris Germanica

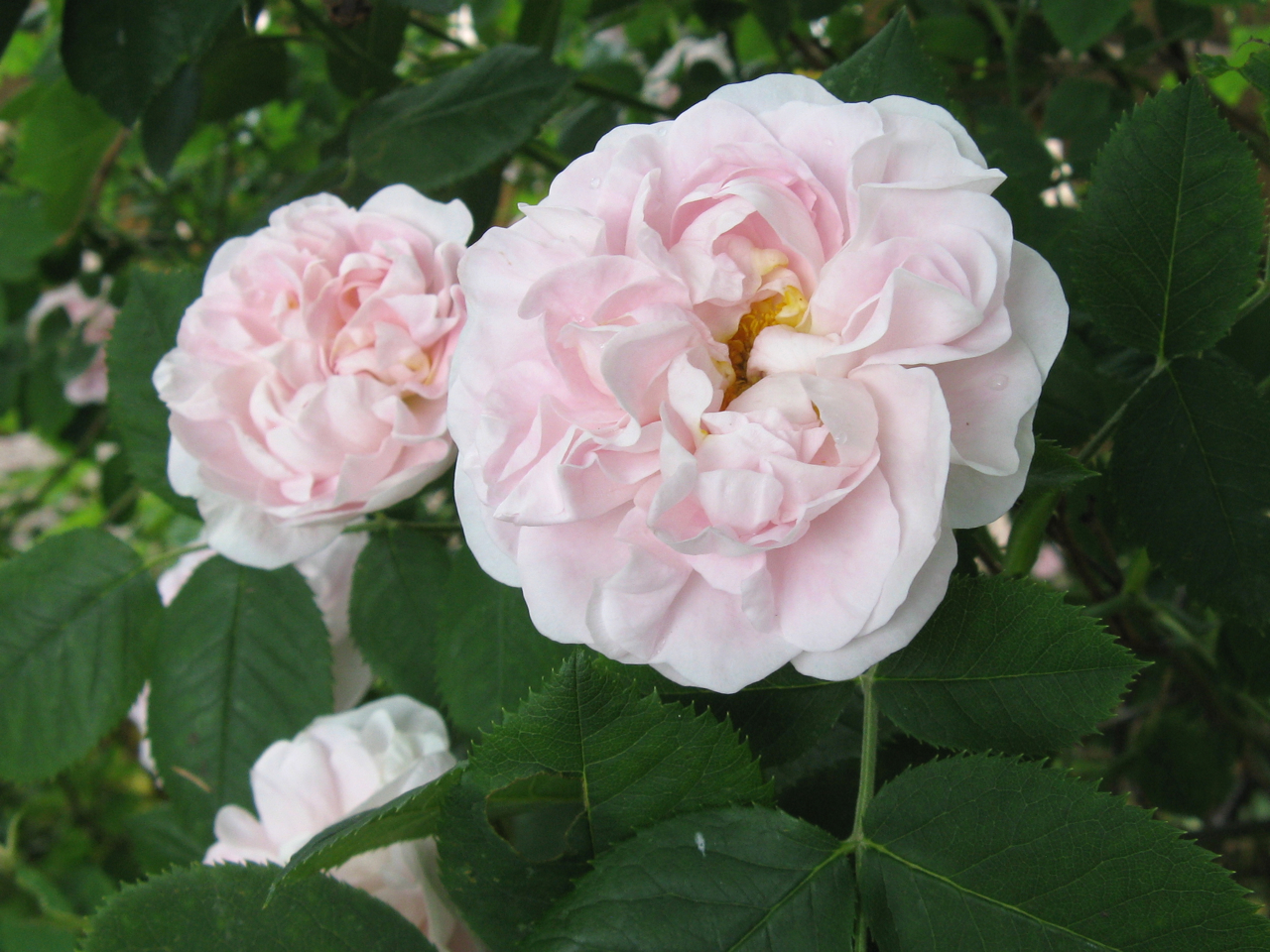
One variety of Rosa alba

== Comparable paintings ==
Comparable Monet paintings with similar palette
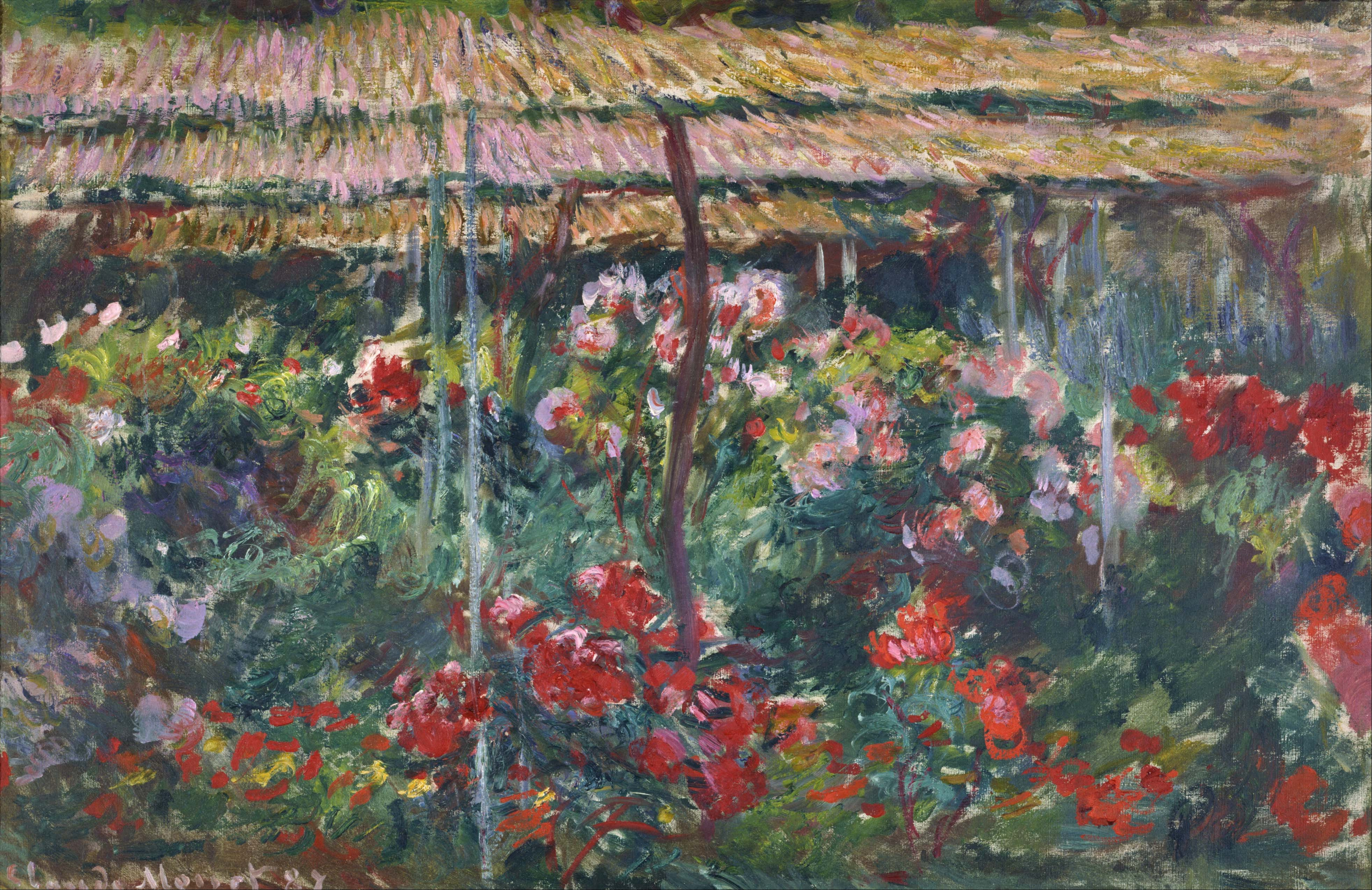
Peony Garden (1887)

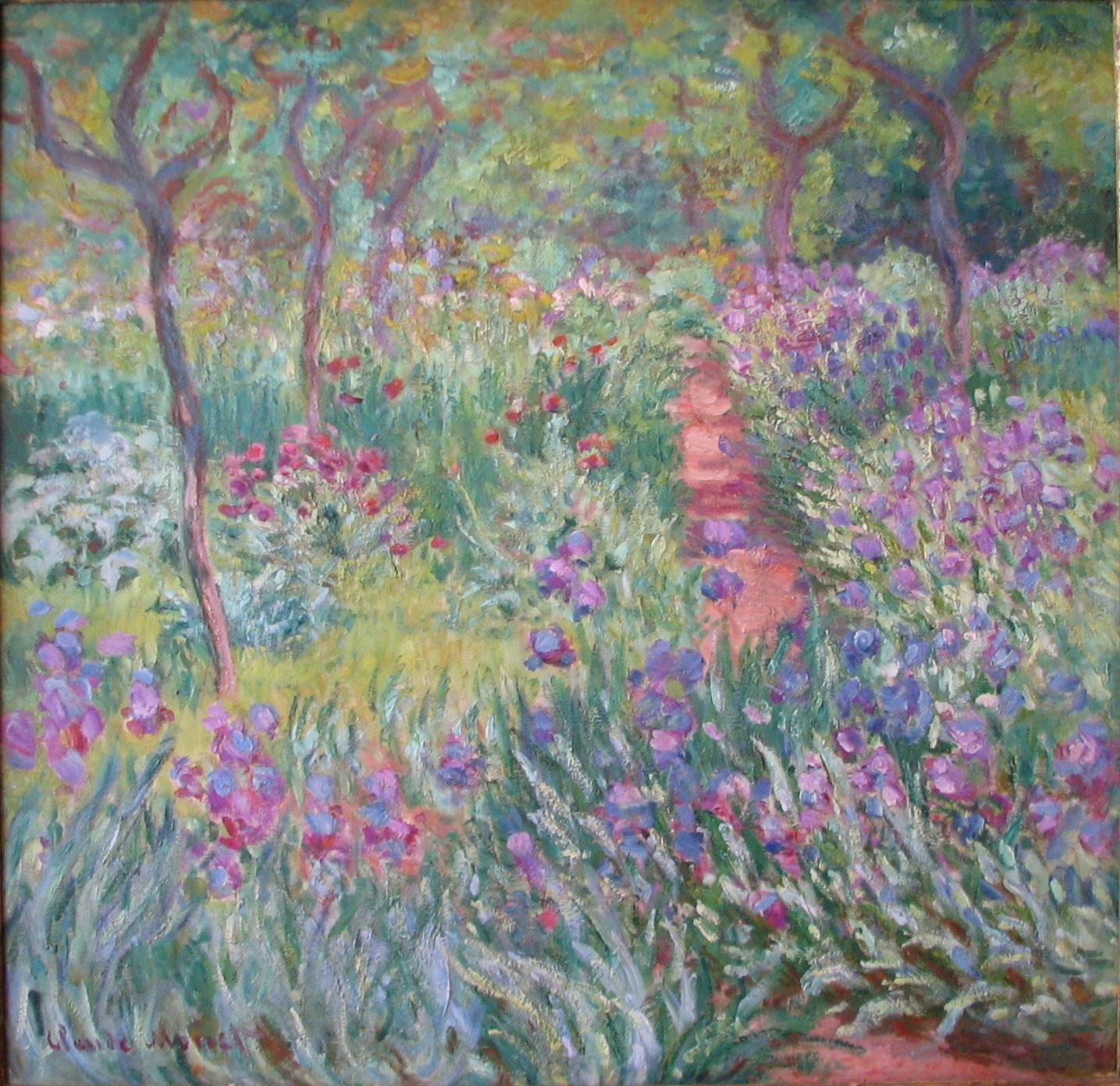
The Artist's Garden at Giverny (1900)

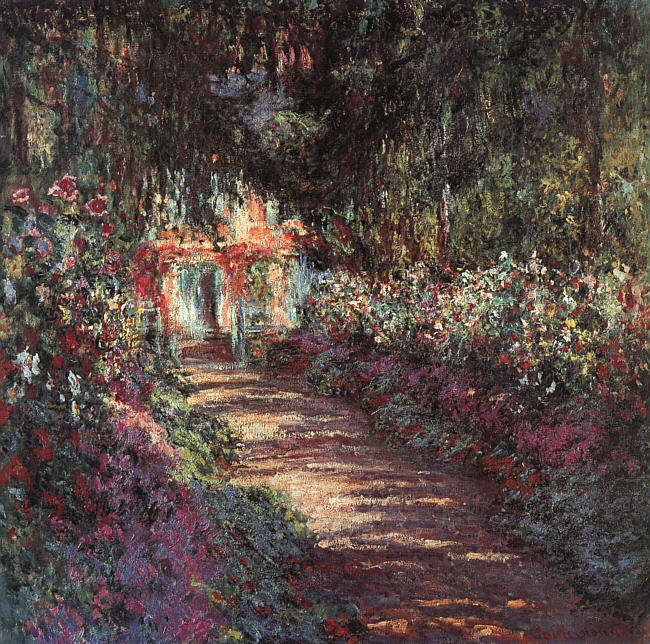
The Garden in Flower (1900)

== Exhibitions ==
As well as in France, Le Jardin de l'artiste à Giverny has been exhibited in Australia, Belgium, Korea, Italy, Japan, Switzerland and the United States. In 2023, climate activists smeared red paint on the work while exhibited in Stockholm to put pressure on the Swedish government to reduce greenhouse gas emissions.

== See also ==
- List of paintings by Claude Monet
- Water Lilies (Monet series)
