= Hélène Rochette =

Canadian artist

Hélène Rochette is a Canadian sculpture artist.

In 1982, she obtained a bachelor's degree in visual arts from the Université Laval in Quebec City.

She created several public art pieces, including Les fluides for the Montreal Metro at the Montmorency station.

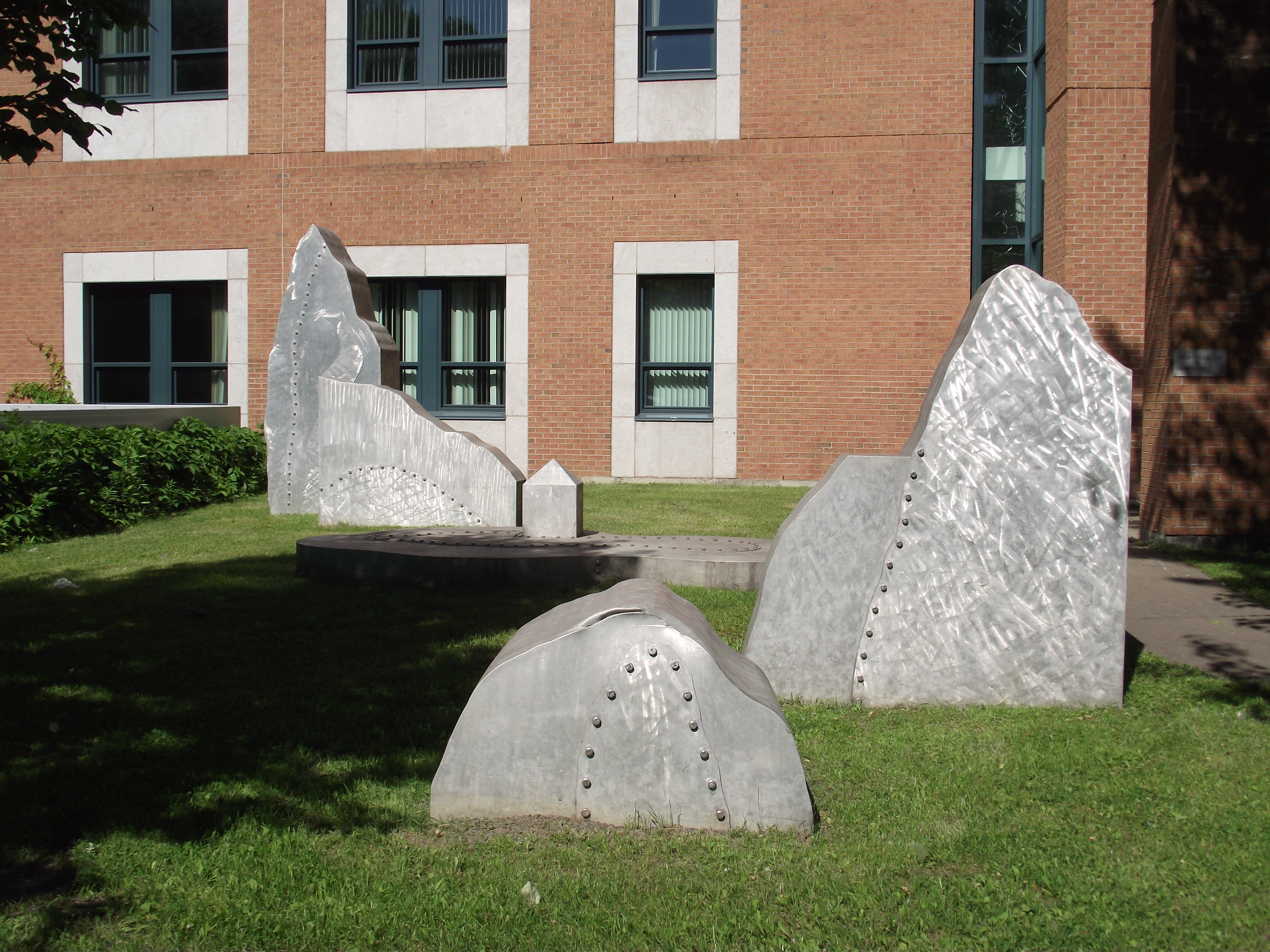
Jardin-Paysage

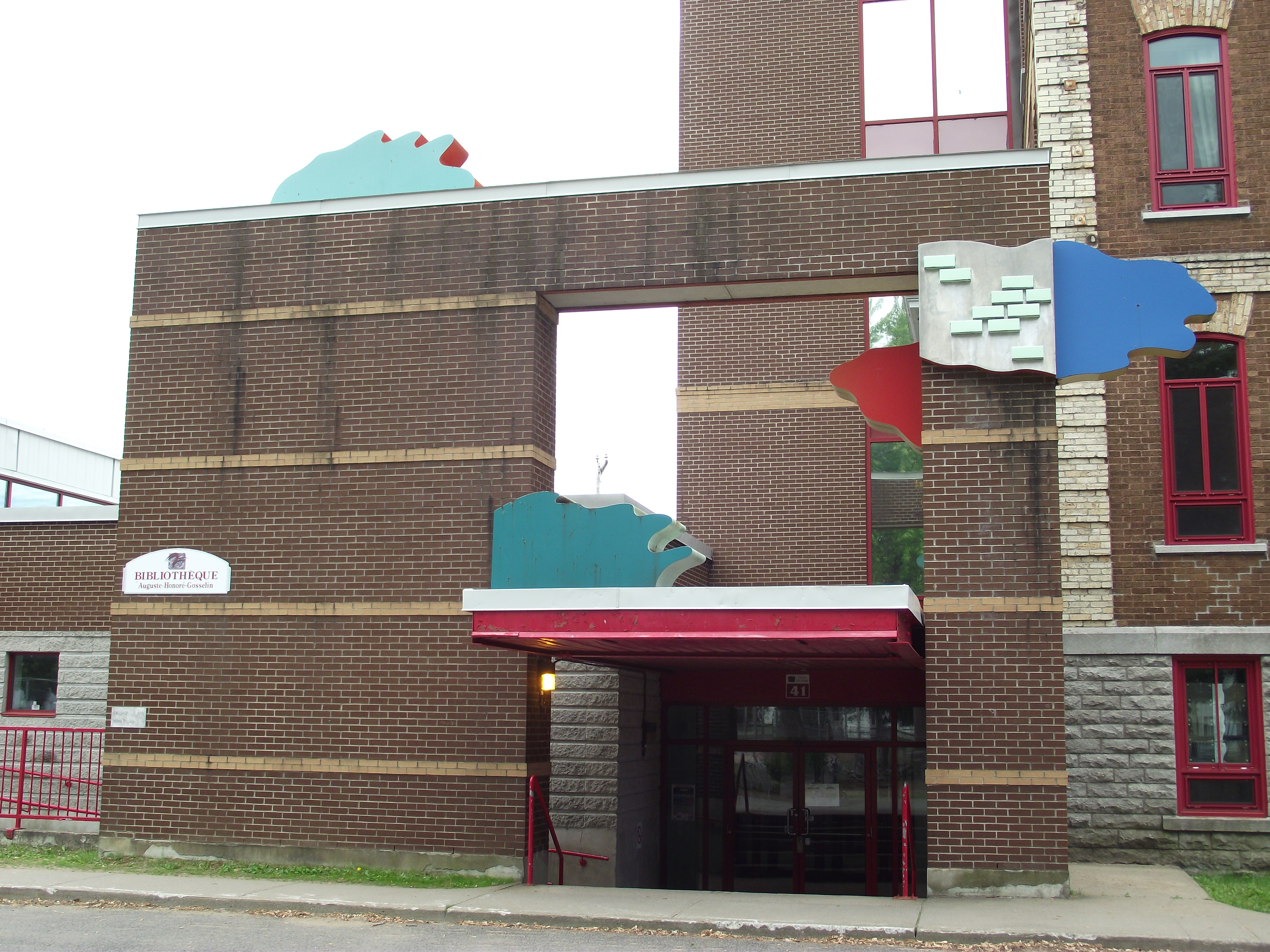
Passage

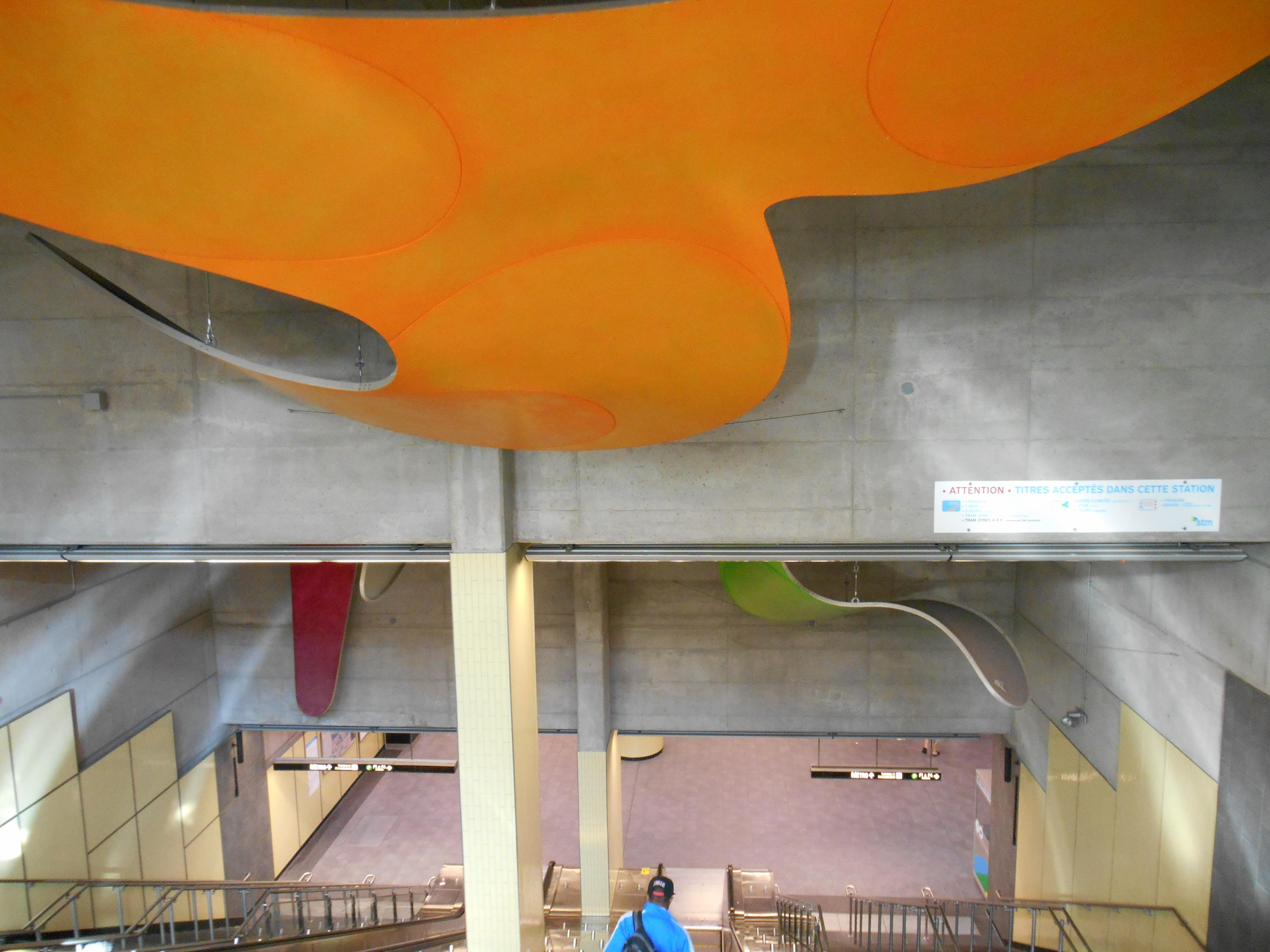
Les fluides
