= The Magpie (Monet) =

1868–1869 painting by Claude Monet

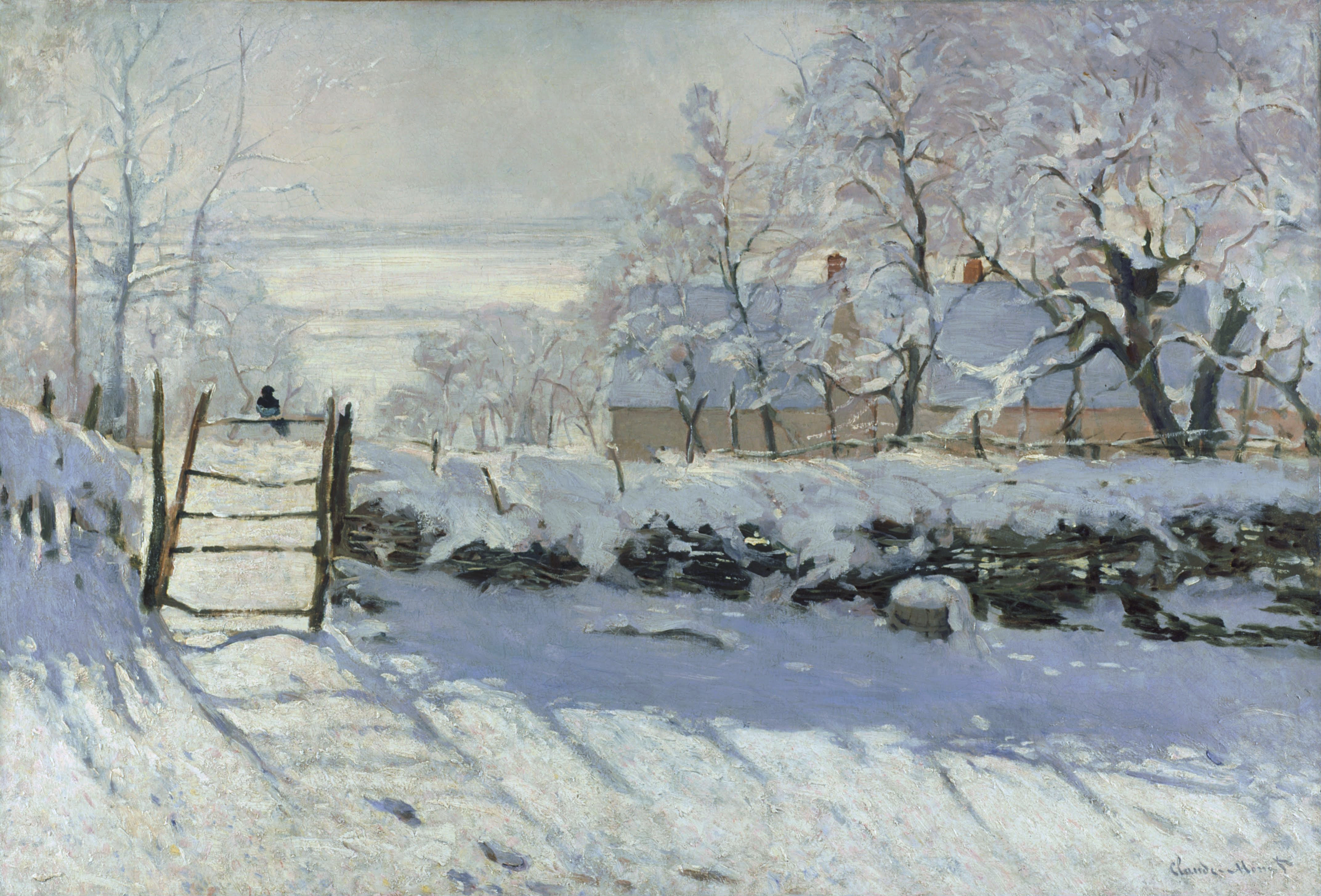
- Artist: Claude Monet
- Year: 1868–1869
- Medium: Oil on canvas
- Dimensions: 89 cm × 130 cm (35 in × 51 in)
- Location: Musée d'Orsay, Paris

The Magpie (French: La Pie) is an oil-on-canvas landscape painting by the French Impressionist Claude Monet, created during the winter of 1868–1869 near the commune of Étretat in Normandy. Monet's patron, Louis Joachim Gaudibert, helped arrange a house in Étretat for Monet's girlfriend Camille Doncieux and their newborn son, allowing Monet to paint in relative comfort, surrounded by his family.

Between 1867 and 1893, Monet and fellow Impressionists Alfred Sisley and Camille Pissarro painted hundreds of landscapes illustrating the natural effect of snow (effet de neige). Similar winter paintings of lesser quantity were produced by Pierre-Auguste Renoir, Gustave Caillebotte, and Paul Gauguin. Art historians believe that a series of severe winters in France contributed to an increase in the number of winter landscapes produced by Impressionists.

The Magpie is one of approximately 140 snowscapes produced by Monet. His first snowscape, A Cart on the Snowy Road at Honfleur, was painted sometime in either 1865 or 1867, followed by a notable series of snowscapes in the same year, beginning with The Road in Front of Saint-Simeon Farm in Winter. The Magpie was completed in 1869 and is Monet's largest winter painting. It was followed by The Red Cape (1869–1871), the only known winter painting featuring Camille Doncieux.

The canvas of The Magpie depicts a solitary black magpie perched on a gate formed in a wattle fence, as the light of the sun shines upon freshly fallen snow creating blue shadows. The painting features one of the first examples of Monet's use of colored shadows, which would later become associated with the Impressionist movement. Monet and the Impressionists used colored shadows to represent the actual, changing conditions of light and shadow as seen in nature, challenging the academic convention of painting shadows black. This subjective theory of color perception was introduced to the art world through the works of Johann Wolfgang von Goethe and Michel Eugène Chevreul earlier in the century.

At the time, Monet's innovative use of light and color led to its rejection by the Paris Salon of 1869. Today, art historians classify The Magpie as one of Monet's best snowscape paintings. The painting was privately held until the Musée d'Orsay acquired it in 1984; it is considered one of the most popular paintings in their permanent collection.

== Background ==
In the late 1850s, French landscape painter Eugène Boudin (1824–1898) introduced Monet (1840–1926) to the art of painting en plein air—"in the open air", using natural light. The invention of the collapsible metal paint tube (1841) and portable easel brought painting, formerly confined to studios, into the outdoors. Boudin and Monet spent the summer of 1858 painting nature together. Like Boudin, Monet came to prefer painting outdoors rather than in a studio, the convention of the time. "If I have become a painter," Monet said, "I owe it to Boudin."

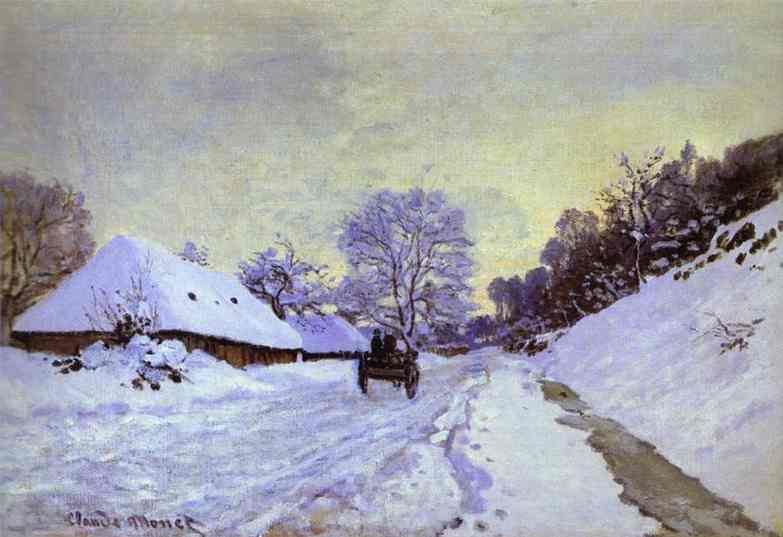
A Cart on the Snowy Road at Honfleur (1865 or 1867), Monet's first snowscape.

The landscape paintings of Dutch painter Johan Barthold Jongkind (1819–1891) influenced both Boudin and Monet and contributed to the development of early Impressionism. After meeting Jongkind in Sainte-Adresse in 1862, Monet began to cultivate an interest in Jongkind's perspective on the changing conditions of the landscape. From Jongkind, Monet learned to substitute optical color for local color. "Complementing the teaching I received from Boudin, Jongkind was from that moment my true master," Monet later reminisced. "It was he who completed the education of my eye". This new way of seeing, a shift from a conceptual to a perceptual approach, formed the basis for Monet's Haystacks (1890–1891), a series of 25 works showing the effects of dynamic atmospheric conditions over time on a single haystack motif.

Gustave Courbet (1819–1877) had been painting effets de neige, "snow effects", from as early as 1856, in a landscape style preferred by Japanese, Dutch, and Flemish artists. Influenced by Courbet, Monet painted his first snowscape, A Cart on the Snowy Road at Honfleur (1865 or 1867). A journalist observed:

We have only seen him once. It was in the winter, during several days of snow, when communications were virtually at a standstill. It was cold enough to split stones. We noticed a foot-warmer, then an easel, then a man, swathed in three coats, his hands in gloves, his face half-frozen. It was M. Monet, studying a snow effect.

In A Cart on the Snowy Road at Honfleur, Monet avoided the usual hunting genre and motifs used by Courbet. Instead, he focused on light and color in a new way by reducing the number of shades. Monet chose an earth tone color scheme and increased the number of shades of blue to highlight reflections on the snow. Monet followed A Cart on the Snowy Road at Honfleur with a notable series of snowscapes in 1867 including Road by Saint-Simeon Farm in Winter.

== First Étretat campaign ==
In 1867, Monet's girlfriend, Camille Doncieux (1847–1879), gave birth to their son Jean in Paris. Lacking money, Monet returned to his father's house in Sainte-Adresse and lived with his aunt, leaving Doncieux and their child in Paris. Monet married Doncieux in 1870. Mme. Louis Joachim Gaudibert, an art collector, became Monet's first patron. Gaudibert helped Monet rent a house in Étretat for Doncieux and Jean in late 1868. Recovering from an episode of depression, Monet joined Doncieux and Jean at the house in Étretat in October, with Doncieux in the role of muse and life model. By December, Monet was in great spirits, "surrounded by everything that I love", and began to focus on painting. In a letter to Frédéric Bazille (1841–1870), Monet wrote:

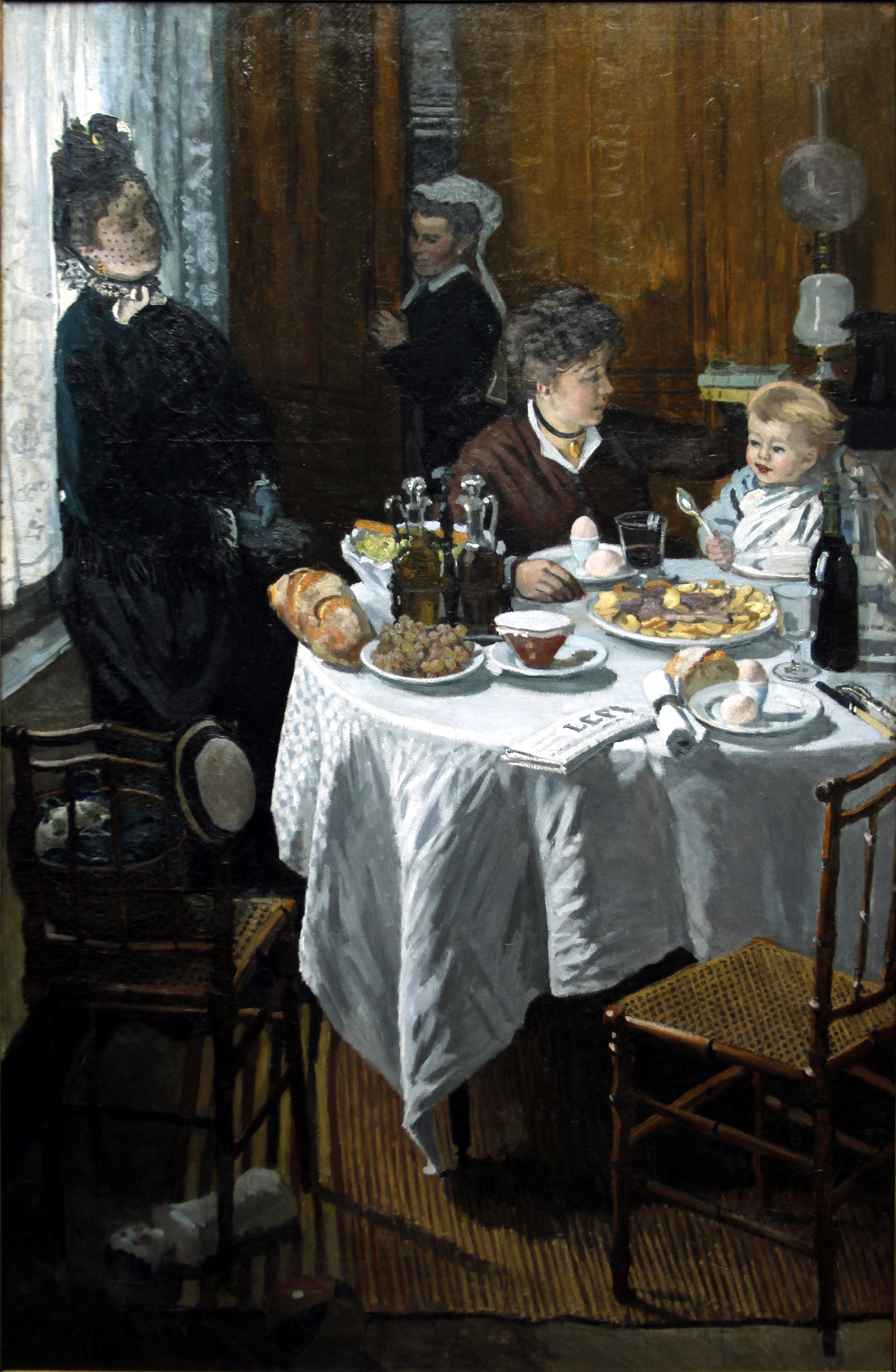
The Luncheon (1868). Camille and son Jean in Étretat.

I spend my time out in the open, on the shingle beach when the weather is bad or the fishing boats go out, or I go into the countryside which is very beautiful here, that I find perhaps still more charming in winter than in summer and, naturally I work all the time, and I believe that this year I am going to do some serious things.

Although he enjoyed living with Camille and Jean in Étretat, Monet preferred to paint alone in the countryside. He told Bazille:

Don't you think that directly in nature and alone one does better?...I've always been of this mind, and what I do under these conditions has always been better. One is too much taken up with what one sees and hears in Paris, however firm one may be, and what I am painting here has at least the merit of not resembling anyone...because it will be simply the expression of what I shall have felt, I myself, personally.

During his time in Étretat, Monet completed three paintings of fishing boats, one of a rural road, and, sometime between late 1868 and January or February 1869, The Magpie (W 133). Painted five years before the first major Impressionist exhibition in 1874, The Magpie is one of Monet's 140 winter landscapes, the largest in its class. The exact location of the snow scene depicted in The Magpie is unknown. Ralph T. Coe proposed that Monet painted the scene near the Farm Saint-Siméon above the Seine estuary in Honfleur.

== Rejection by the Salon ==
Monet submitted The Magpie and Fishing Boats at Sea (W 126) to the Salon of 1869. Both paintings were rejected in April. Critic Paul Richard said that the jurors rejected the painting as "too common and too coarse". Monet's experimental use of color and radical departure from the descriptive, academic style surprised the public and probably contributed to its dismissal by the jury. Monet told French novelist Arsène Houssaye (1815–1896), "This rejection has taken the bread from my mouth, and in spite of my low prices, collectors and dealers turn their backs on me." A century later, The Magpie was acquired by the Musée d'Orsay in 1984. It became one of the most popular paintings in their permanent collection.

== Critical analysis ==
In the painting, a black magpie is perched on a gate in a wattle fence as sunlight falls on fresh white snow, creating shadows. With no human figures present, the bird on the gate becomes the focus. Michael Howard of Manchester Metropolitan University called the painting "an extraordinary evocation of the snow-bound chill of a late winter's afternoon. The blueness of the long shadows creates a delicate contrast with the creamy whites of the sky and landscape". Curator Lynn Orr, then of the Fine Arts Museums of San Francisco, noted Monet's interest in the changing light that depended on the hour and the vagaries of the atmosphere:

Unusual weather phenomena, such as snow and mist, fascinated Monet because they altered the chromatic appearance of familiar topography. In such paintings as The Magpie, one of Monet's early masterpieces, form dissolves under the combination of a greatly restricted color range, aerial perspective, and broken brushwork. A virtuoso color performance, the painting is an essay on the variations of white perceptible in the reflection of sun on crisp new snow. Wonderfully abstract passages of flat color, such as the strong violet shades along the fence, are divorced from the spatial realities of the objects portrayed.

The Magpie is an early example of Monet's investigation of colored shadows. In this piece, Monet makes use of the complementary colors of blue and yellow. The shadow produced by yellow sunlight shining on the snow gives the impression of a blue-violet color, the effect of simultaneous contrast. French Impressionists popularized the use of colored shadows, which went against the artistic convention of portraying shadows by darkening and desaturating the color. Colored shadows can be directly observed in nature, particularly in the type of snow scene presented by Monet. In his study of Impressionism, art historian John Rewald observed that artists used snowscapes to "investigate the problem of shadows". The problem is summarized by Fred S. Kleiner in Gardner's Art Through the Ages:

After scrutinizing the effects of light and color on forms, the Impressionists concluded that local color—an object's true color in white light— becomes modified by the quality of the light shining on it, by reflections from other objects, and by the effects juxtaposed colors produce. Shadows do not appear gray or black, as many earlier painters thought, but are composed of colors modified by reflections or other conditions. Using various colors and short choppy brush strokes, Monet was able to catch accurately the vibrating quality of light.

Monet's use of colored shadows arose from color theories that were popular in the 19th century. German scientist Johann Wolfgang von Goethe (1749–1832) published one of the first modern descriptions of colored shadows in his Theory of Colours (1810). Goethe attempted to challenge the theory of color propounded by Isaac Newton (1643–1727) in his treatise on Opticks (1704). Goethe raised questions about subjective and objective color theory and perception, but his intuitive, non-mathematical approach was criticized as unscientific, and his attack on Newton was dismissed as a polemic. The questions Goethe raised about color persisted. Thirty years later, French chemist Michel Eugène Chevreul (1786–1889) expanded on Goethe's theory with The Principles of Harmony and Contrast of Colors (1839). Goethe and Chevreul's colour theory greatly influenced the art world. It is generally thought that Vincent van Gogh, Camille Pissarro and Monet incorporated elements of these theories into their work. Georges Seurat (1859–1891) came to prominence in 1886 with his technique of chromatic division, a style influenced by the color scheme theories of Chevreul and American physicist Ogden Rood (1831–1902).

== Related work ==
Monet's series of 11 paintings depicting The Bridge at Argenteuil (1874) also explored the use of colored shadows in its portrayal of the blue and purple shadow on the top portion of the bridge. Over the years, Monet became more and more obsessed with color and light. When his wife was dying in September 1879, Monet painted her in Camille Monet on Her Deathbed (1879), noting the "blue, yellow, grey tones". Monet told his friend, French statesman Georges Clemenceau (1841–1929), that he spent the time "focusing on her temples and automatically analyzing the succession of appropriately graded colors which death was imposing on her motionless face." Camille died from cancer at the age of 32. After her death, Monet largely ceased painting people, focusing instead on natural landscapes. Monet later returned to painting snow and colored shadows with Grainstacks Snow Effect (1891).

== Derivative work ==
In honor of the 150th anniversary of Monet's birth, the Principality of Monaco issued a stamp of The Magpie in 1990, designed by French engraver Pierre Albuisson.

French design studio Les 84 created a 3D version of The Magpie for the 2010–2011 Monet exhibition at the Galeries nationales du Grand Palais.

== Provenance ==
- Thor Carlander collection, Paris (1918)
- Durand-Ruel collection, Paris (1941)
- Guerlain collection, Paris (1946)
- Louvre, Paris (1984)
- Musée d'Orsay, Paris (1984)

== See also ==
- List of paintings by Claude Monet
- Chromatic gray
