= A Cart on the Snowy Road at Honfleur =

1865 painting by Claude Monet

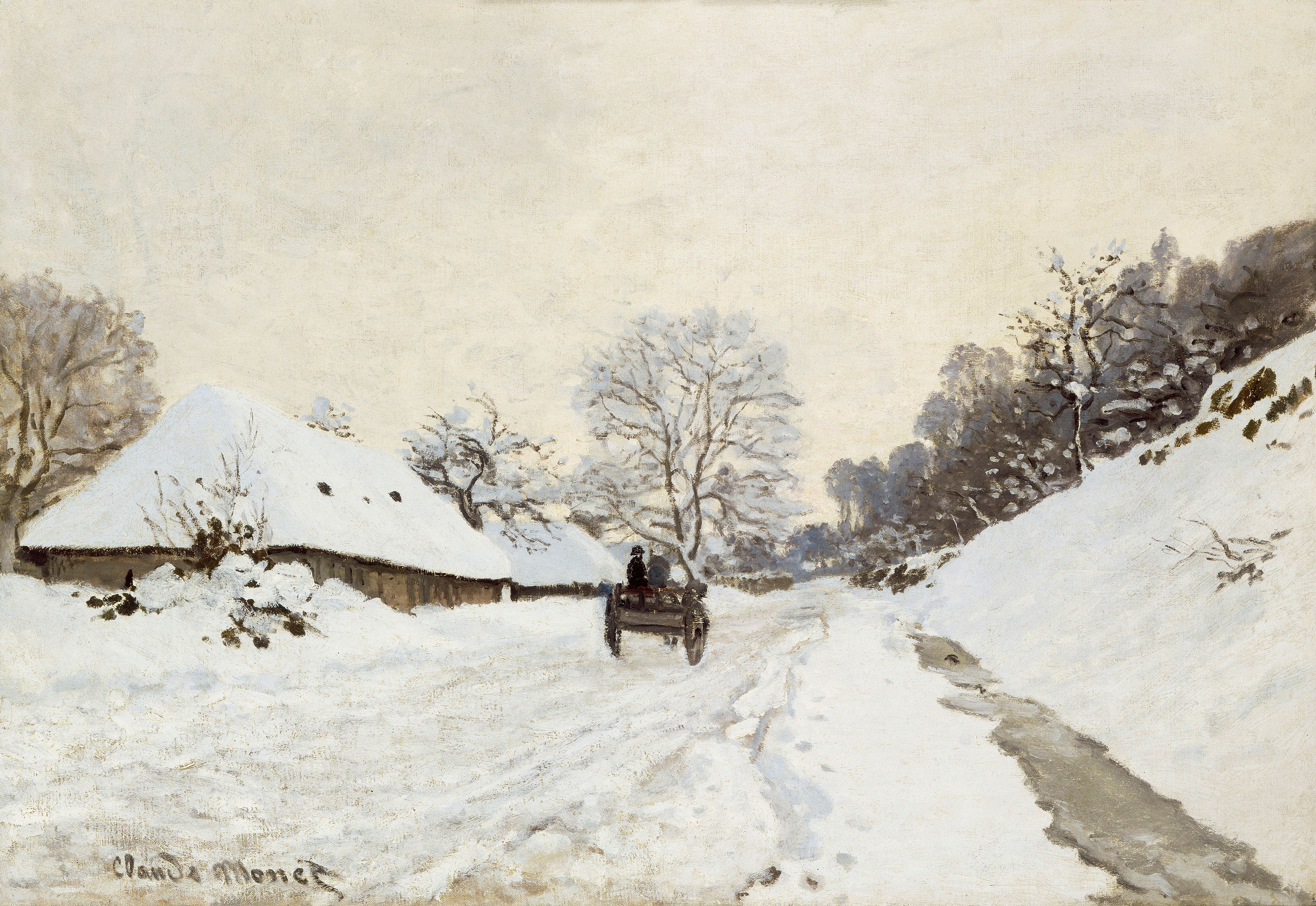
- Artist: Claude Monet
- Year: 1865
- Medium: Oil on canvas
- Dimensions: 65 cm × 92 cm (26 in × 36 in)
- Location: Musée d'Orsay; Paris

A Cart on the Snowy Road at Honfleur (French: La Charrette, route sous la neige à Honfleur) is an oil-on-canvas snowscape painting by French impressionist Claude Monet. The painting depicts a man on a wooden cart travelling along a snow-laden road in Honfleur.

A Cart on the Snowy Road at Honfleur is one of nearly 140 snowscapes painted by Monet. It is believed to be his first completed snowscape, and is similar to other snowscapes by him such as The Road in Front of Saint-Simeon Farm in Winter, The Magpie, Snow at Argenteuil, and The Red Cape.

The painting is thought to be heavily influenced by the snowscapes of Japanese artist Utagawa Hiroshige (1797–1858), such as Ochanomizu and Clear weather after snow at Kaneyama (1797–1858). Aspects such as the single vanishing point and varied colors of snow can also trace their influences back to Japan.

== Influences ==
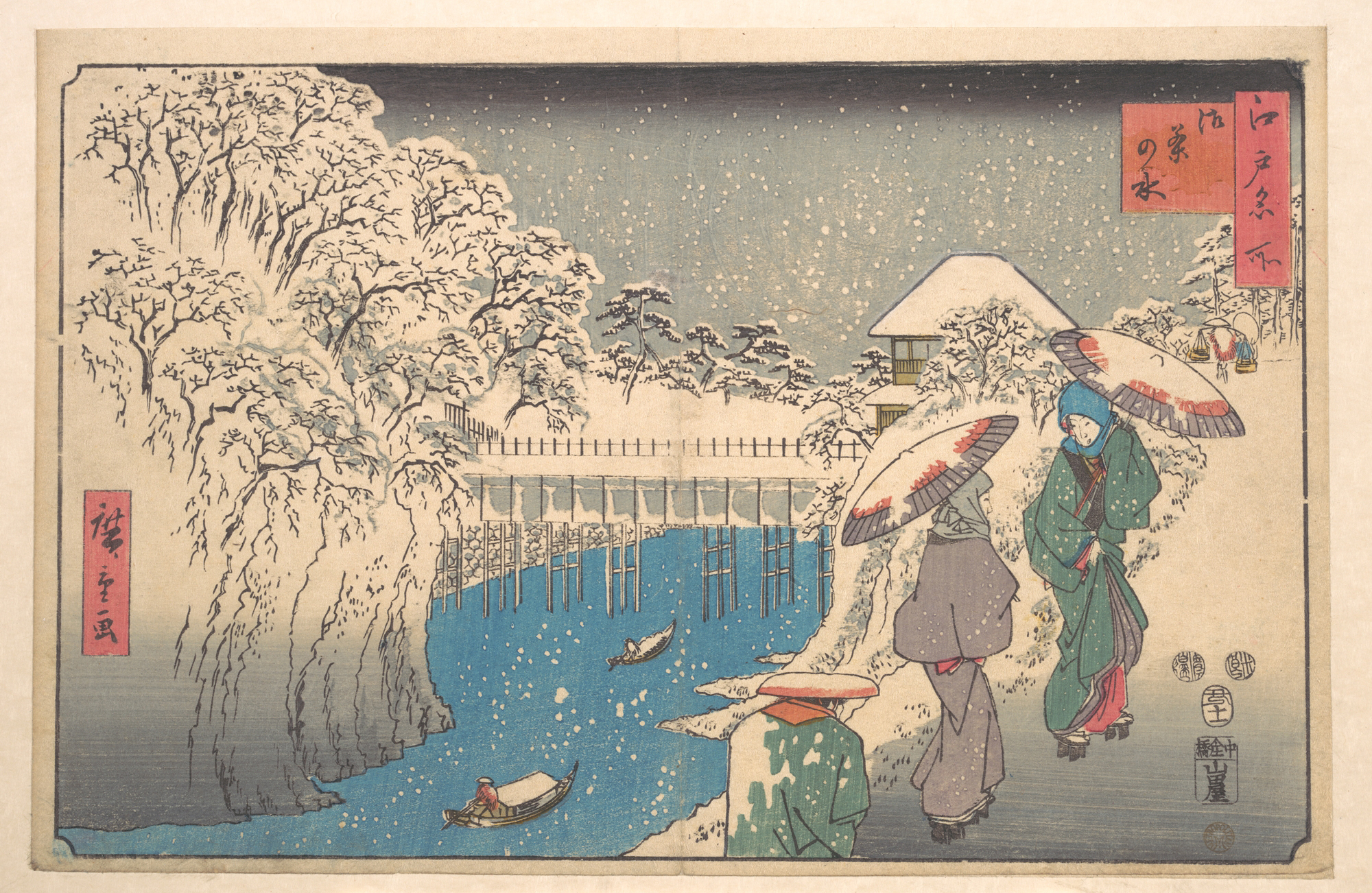
Ochanomizu, dated 11th month, Ox year, 1853

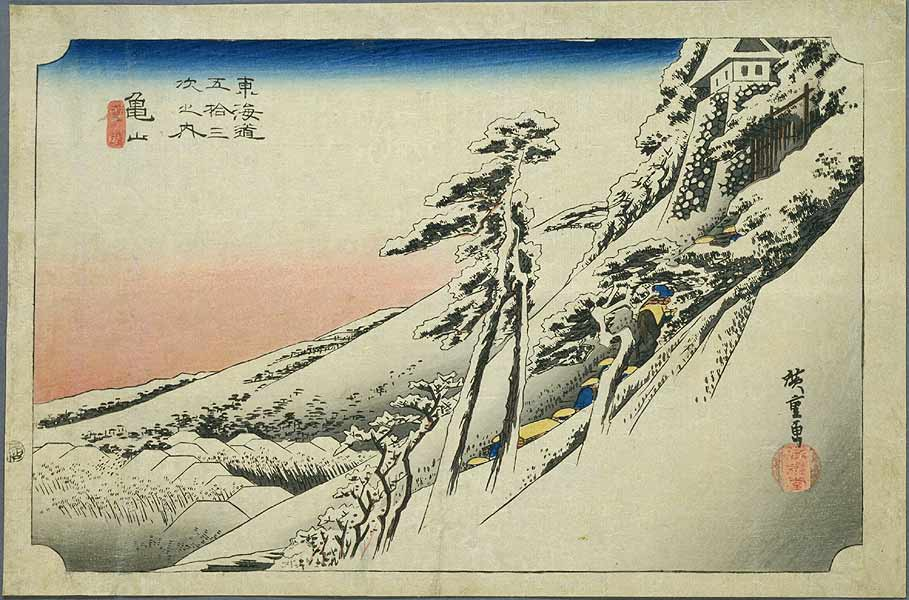
Clear weather after snow at Kaneyama. Kaneyama-juku in the 1830s, as depicted by Hiroshige in the Hōeidō edition of The Fifty-three Stations of the Tōkaidō (1831–1834)

== See also ==
- List of paintings by Claude Monet
