= Vétheuil =

- Commune
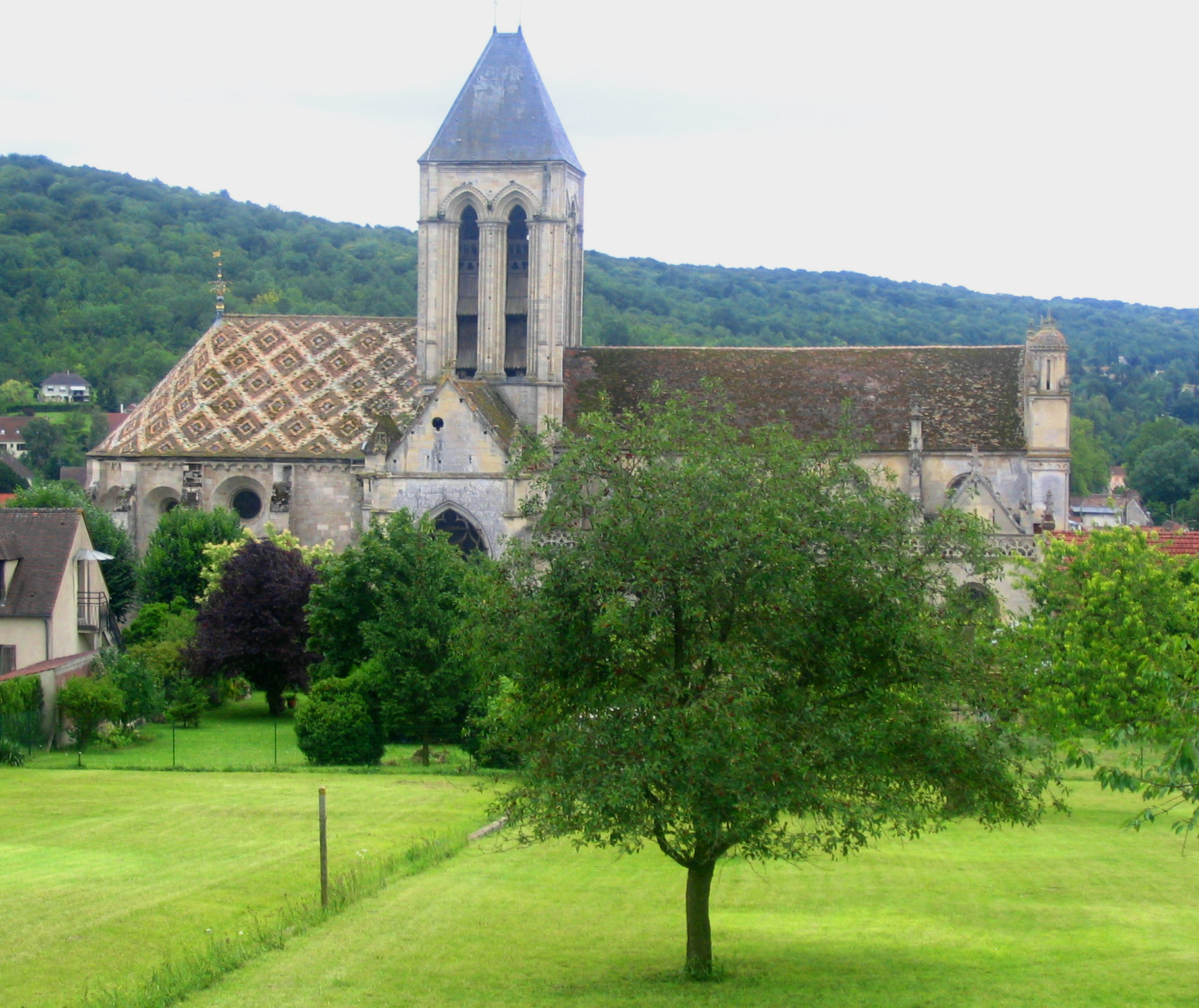
- Notre-Dame

- Coat of arms
- Location of Vétheuil
- Location within France Location within Île-de-France (region)
- Coordinates: 49°03′52″N 1°42′14″E
- Country: France
- Region: Île-de-France
- Department: Val-d'Oise
- Arrondissement: Pontoise
- Canton: Vauréal
- Intercommunality: Vexin Val de Seine

Government
  - Mayor (2020–2026): Dominique Herpin-Poulenat
- Area^{1}: 4.30 km^{2} (1.66 sq mi)
- Highest elevation: 150 m (490 ft)
- Lowest elevation: 9 m (30 ft)
- Population (2023): 849
  - Density: 197/km^{2} (511/sq mi)
- Time zone: UTC+01:00 (CET)
  - Summer (DST): UTC+02:00 (CEST)
- INSEE/Postal code: 95651 /95510
- ^{1} French Land Register data, which excludes lakes, ponds, glaciers > 1 km^{2} (0.386 sq mi or 247 acres) and river estuaries.

Vétheuil (French pronunciation: [vetœj]) is a commune on the Seine, 60 kilometers northwest of Paris, France. Vétheuil is located in the arrondissement of Pontoise in the Val-d'Oise department.

== Personalities ==
Impressionist painter Claude Monet lived in Vétheuil from 1878 to 1881, during which time he produced some 150 paintings. Joan Mitchell moved to Vetheuil in 1959 where she productively made many abstract works.

Camille Doncieux (1847-1879) was the first wife of Claude Monet, who painted her portrait in 1886. Before marrying Monet she was his model, and appeared three times in the painting Women in the Garden (Femmes au jardin). She died in Vétheuil, where she and her husband lived since 1878, and her grave is in Vétheuil cemetery.

== See also ==
- Communes of the Val-d'Oise department
