= Camille (Monet) =

1866 painting by Claude Monet

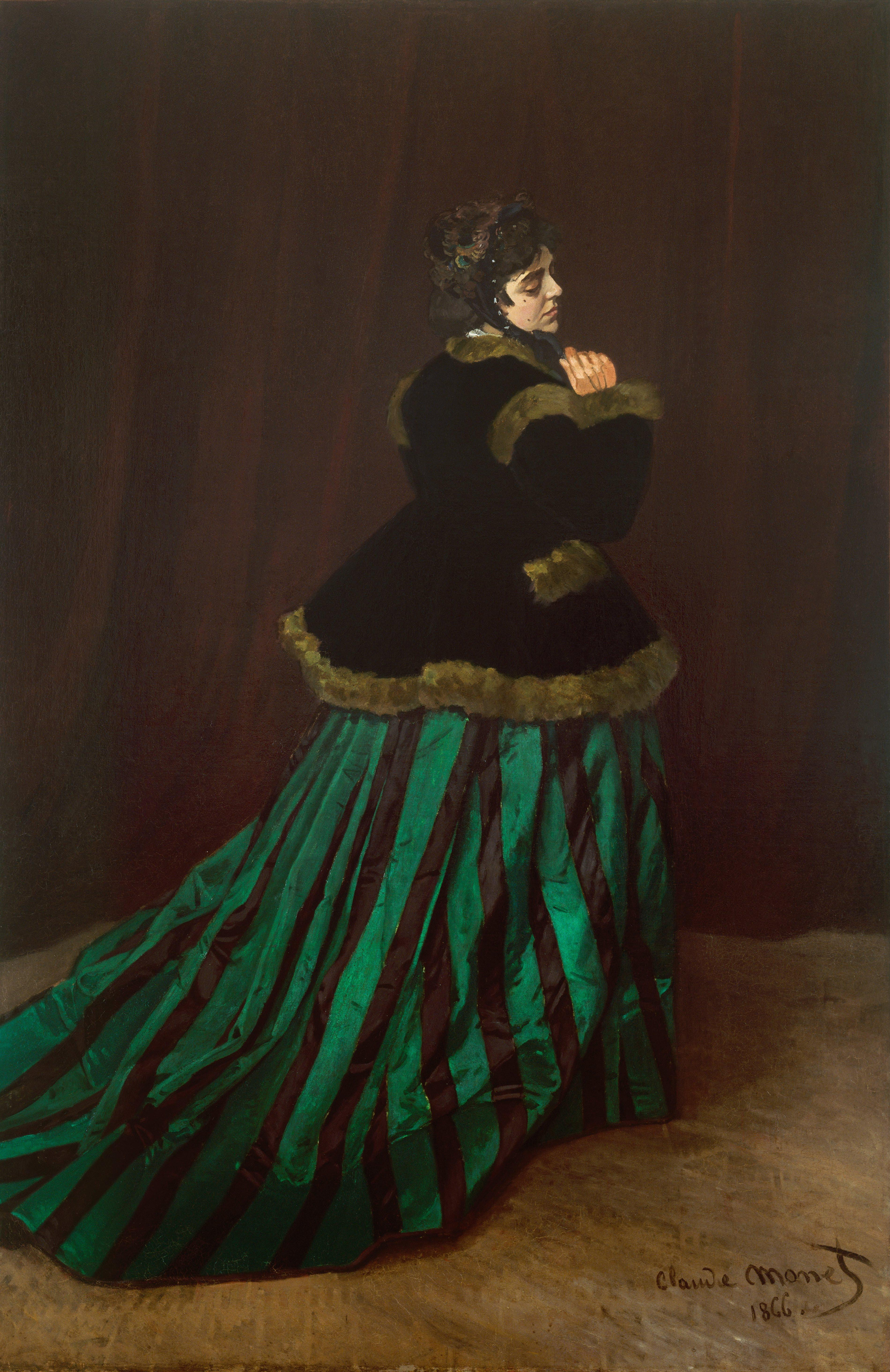
- Artist: Claude Monet
- Year: 1866
- Medium: Oil on canvas
- Dimensions: 231 cm × 151 cm (91 in × 59 in)
- Location: Kunsthalle Bremen

Camille, also known as The Woman in the Green Dress, is an 1866 oil-on-canvas painting by French artist Claude Monet. The portrait shows Monet's future wife, Camille Doncieux, wearing a green dress and jacket. Monet submitted the work to the Paris Salon of 1866, where it was well received by critics. The painting is held in the Kunsthalle Bremen collection.

== Description ==
Camille in the Green Dress is a life-size portrait. Camille wears a green and black striped silk dress over a black jacket trimmed with fur. The dress in emerald green corresponds to the fashion of the time with the contrasting vertical stripes. Yellow leather gloves and a dark capote decorated with feathers serve as accessories. Camille wears her hair in a bun tied with black ribbons at the nape of her neck. The background has a dark red, almost black curtain.

In the composition of the image, Monet succeeded in conveying movement. The train of the dress has been cut off at its left edge, causing a movement in that direction that goes beyond the edge of the picture. Liveliness is also created by the play of the folds in the skirt. The slightly backward-turned position of the head represents a moment of pause. The figure seems to be listening to herself rather than reacting to someone speaking to her. This is achieved through downcast eyes, thereby avoiding eye contact with the viewer. The painting is signed at the lower right: Claude Monet 1866.

The lighting is uniquely diffused and its origin is obscure. We see a kind of a semi-circle of light surrounding Camille on the floor with the source highlighting her face, hand and skirt. Light is probably coming from a window since it looks too natural to be produced by candles or gas lamps. The place of the window is hard to tell but it's probably to the left and in front of her as her shadow is cast to the right, but her face and skirt are still highlighted.

== See also ==
- List of paintings by Claude Monet
