= Springtime (Claude Monet) =

1872 painting by Claude Monet

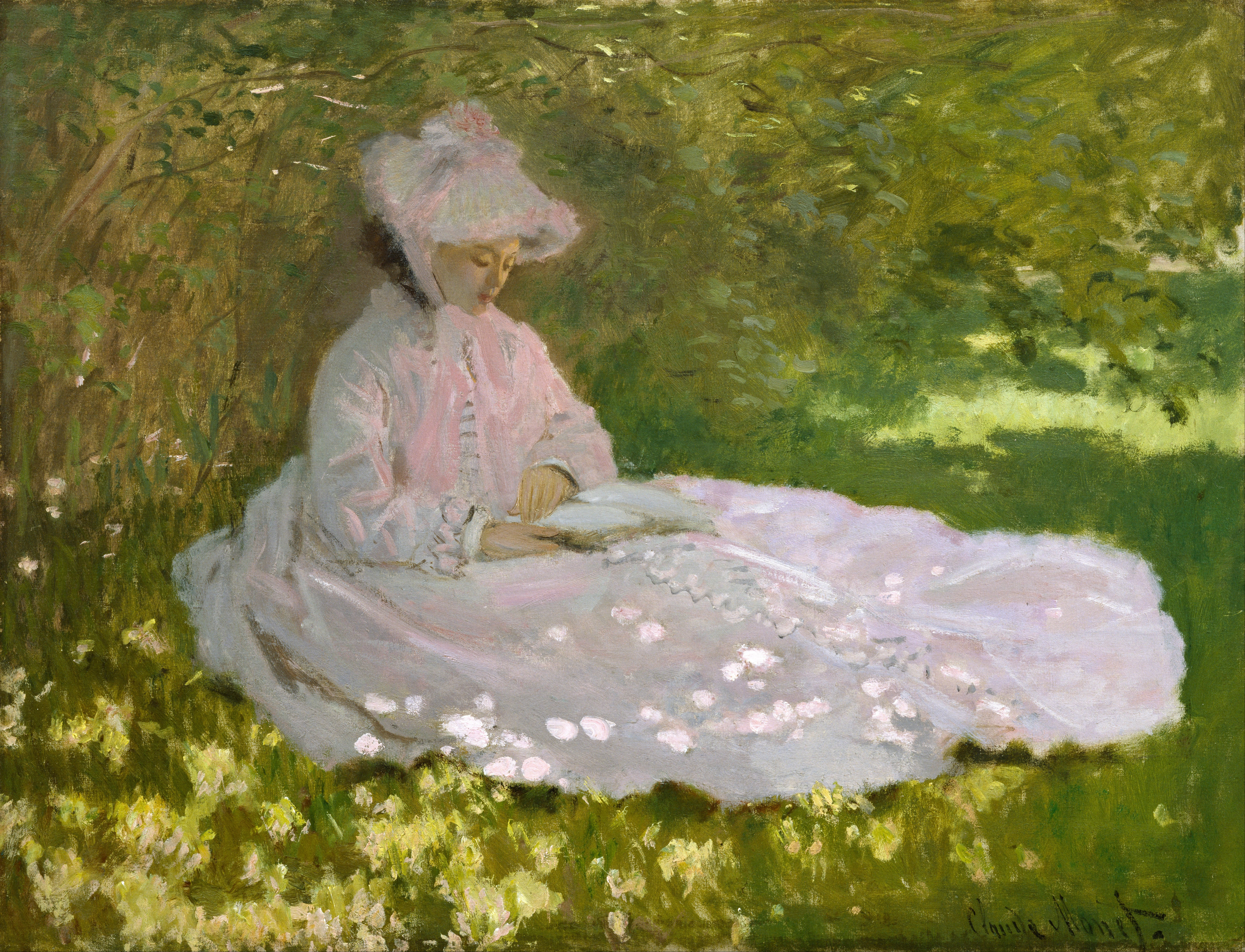
- Artist: Claude Monet
- Year: 1872
- Medium: Oil on canvas
- Dimensions: 50 cm × 65.5 cm (20 in × 25.8 in)
- Location: Walters Art Museum, Baltimore

Springtime or The Reader is an 1872 painting by the French Impressionist painter Claude Monet. It depicts his first wife, Camille Doncieux, seated reading beneath a canopy of lilacs. The painting is presently held by the Walters Art Museum.

== History ==
In this painting, Claude Monet uses his first wife, Camille Doncieux, as the model. Camille and Claude Monet were married in 1870. Before this time, she had been his mistress and served as a model for Monet's figurative paintings of the 1860s and 1870s. It is said that Camille possessed unusual talent as a model and was also used by Auguste Renoir and Édouard Manet.

Late in the year 1871, Monet and his family settled in Argenteuil, a village northwest of Paris. The village was a popular resort for urban pleasure-seekers. Colleagues of Monet frequently joined him and the village became associated with Impressionism. In the spring of 1872, Monet painted a number of canvases in his garden, often showing Camille and Alfred Sisley's companion, Adélaïde-Eugénie Lescouezec.

Springtime was on display at an exhibition organized by the Impressionists at Paul Durand-Ruel's Paris Gallery, from March 30 to April 30, 1876. Monet exhibited 18 works, in which six of them Camille had posed. During this exhibition, Springtime was given the more generic title of Woman Reading.

Monet's second wife, Alice Hoschedé, ordered the complete destruction of pictures and mementos from Camille's life with Monet. Therefore, Camille's image almost solely survives on the basis of Monet's paintings.

== Composition ==
In this composition, Camille is seated serenely beneath a canopy of lilacs. Her face and form are in close focus, unlike later depictions which portray her as older and far less attractive. Sunlight peeks through the trees, creating patches of light on the ground and on her muslin dress. The painting represents an enchanting scene of domestic life.

== Off the Wall ==
In 2012, a reproduction of Springtime was featured in Off the Wall, an open-air exhibition on the streets of Baltimore, Maryland. The reproduction – the original is part of the Walters Art Museum collection – was on display at the Cylburn Arboretum. The National Gallery in London began the concept of bringing art out of doors in 2007 and the Detroit Institute of Art introduced the concept in the U.S.. The Off the Wall reproductions of the Walters' paintings are done on weather-resistant vinyl and include a description of the painting and a QR code for smart phones.

== Exhibition history ==
- Monet-Rodin. Galerie Georges Petit, Paris. 1889.
- From Ingres to Gauguin: French Nineteenth Century Paintings Owned in Maryland. Baltimore Museum of Art, Baltimore. 1951.
- The Image Lost and Found. Metropolitan Boston Arts Center, Boston. 1960.
- 2e Exposition de Peinture. Galerie Durand-Ruel, Paris. 1876.
- Contrasts in Impressionism. Baltimore Museum of Art, Baltimore. 1942.
- Themes and Variations in Painting and Sculpture. Baltimore Museum of Art, Baltimore. 1948.
- Monet and the Beginnings of Impressionism. The Currier Gallery of Art, Manchester, Manchester. 1949.
- Paintings by the Impressionists and Post Impressionists. Virginia Museum of Fine Arts, Richmond. 1950.
- Inaugural Exhibition at the Fort Worth Art Center. Fort Worth Art Center, Fort Worth. 1954.
- The Turn of the Century: Exhibition of Masterpieces, 1880-1920. Denver Art Museum, Denver. 1956.
- Claude Monet. City Art Museum of Saint Louis, St. Louis; Minneapolis Institute of Arts, Minneapolis. 1957.
- A Baltimorean in Paris: George A. Lucas, 1860-1909. The Walters Art Gallery, Baltimore. 1979.
- Hommage à Claude Monet (1840–1926). Galeries nationales du Grand Palais, Paris. 1980.
- Claude Monet - Auguste Rodin: Centenaire de l'Exposition de 1889. Musee Auguste Rodin, Paris. 1989-1990.
- Monet: A Retrospective. Bridgestone Museum of Art, Tokyo; Nagoya City Art Museum, Nagoya, Aici. 1994.
- Claude Monet 1840–1926. The Art Institute of Chicago, Chicago. 1995.
- Before Monet: Landscape Painting in France and Impressionist Masters: Highlights from The Walters Collection. The Walters Art Gallery, Baltimore. 1998.
- Monet: Late Paintings of Giverny from the Musee Marmottan. San Diego Museum Of Art, San Diego; Portland Art Museum, Portland; The Walters Art Gallery, Baltimore. 1998-1999.
- Faces of Impressionism: Portraits from American Collections. Baltimore Museum of Art, Baltimore; The Museum of Fine Arts, Houston, Houston; The Cleveland Museum of Art, Cleveland. 1999-2000.
- A Magnificent Age: Masterpieces from the Walters Art Museum, Baltimore. The Nelson-Atkins Museum of Art, Kansas City; Mint Museum of Art, Charlotte; The Walters Art Museum, Baltimore. 2002-2004.
- In Monet's Light: Theodore Robinson at Giverny. Baltimore Museum of Art, Baltimore; Phoenix Art Museum, Phoenix; Wadsworth Atheneum Museum of Art, Hartford. 2004-2005.
- Claude Monet (1840–1926): A Tribute to Daniel Wildenstein and Katia Granoff. Wildenstein & Company, New York. 2007.
- 19th Century Masterpieces from the Walters Art Museum. Santa Barbara Museum of Art, Santa Barbara; Jack S. Blanton Museum of Art, Austin. 2010-2011.

== See also ==
- List of paintings by Claude Monet
