= Camille Doncieux =

First wife of Claude Monet (1847–1879)

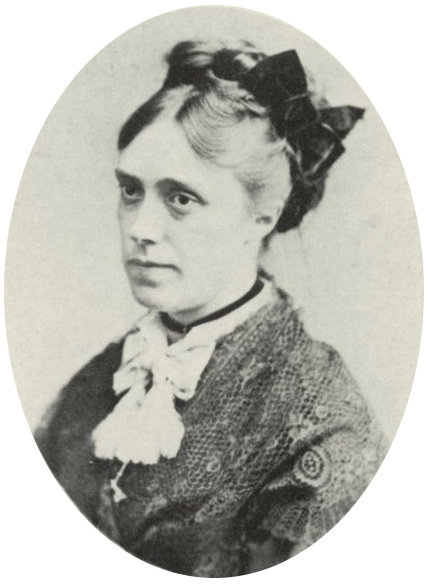
Greiner, Camille Monet, 1871

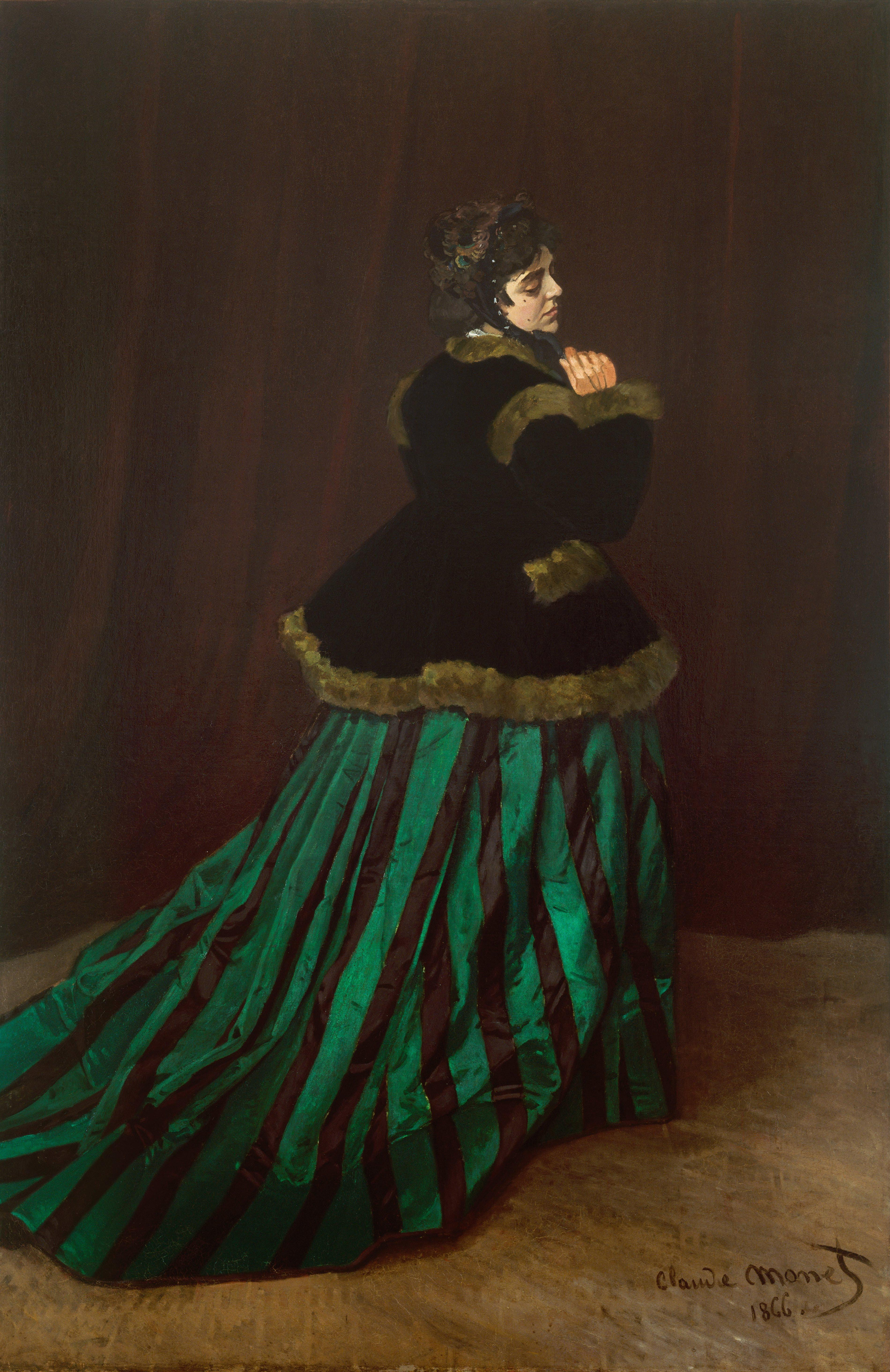
Claude Monet's Camille (The Woman in the Green Dress), 1866

Camille-Léonie "Camille" Doncieux (French pronunciation: [kamij leɔni dɔ̃sjø]; 15 January 1847 – 5 September 1879) was the first wife of French painter Claude Monet, with whom she had two sons. She was the subject of a number of paintings by Monet, as well as Renoir and Manet.

== Early life ==
Camille-Léonie Doncieux was born in the town of La Guillotière, later merged into Lyon, France, on 15 January 1847. Her parents were Leonie-Françoise (née Manéchalle) Doncieux and Charles Claude Doncieux, who was a merchant. The family moved to Paris, near the Sorbonne, early in the Second French Empire (1852-1870). A few years after the birth of a second child, Geneviève-François, in 1857, the family moved to Batignolles, which became part of northwestern Paris. Batignolles was popular with artists.

While in her teens, Doncieux began work as a model. She met Monet, seven years her senior, in 1865 and became his model posing for numerous paintings. They lived together in poverty at the beginning of his career. His aunt and father did not approve of the relationship with Camille. During Camille's pregnancy with their first son, his father recommended he break off the relationship immediately. Monet left her in Paris and stayed at his aunt's country estate to give the appearance that he was no longer in the relationship, so that his aunt would continue to pay him a monthly cheque. Camille was left behind in Paris without funds for her care.

== Marriage and children ==
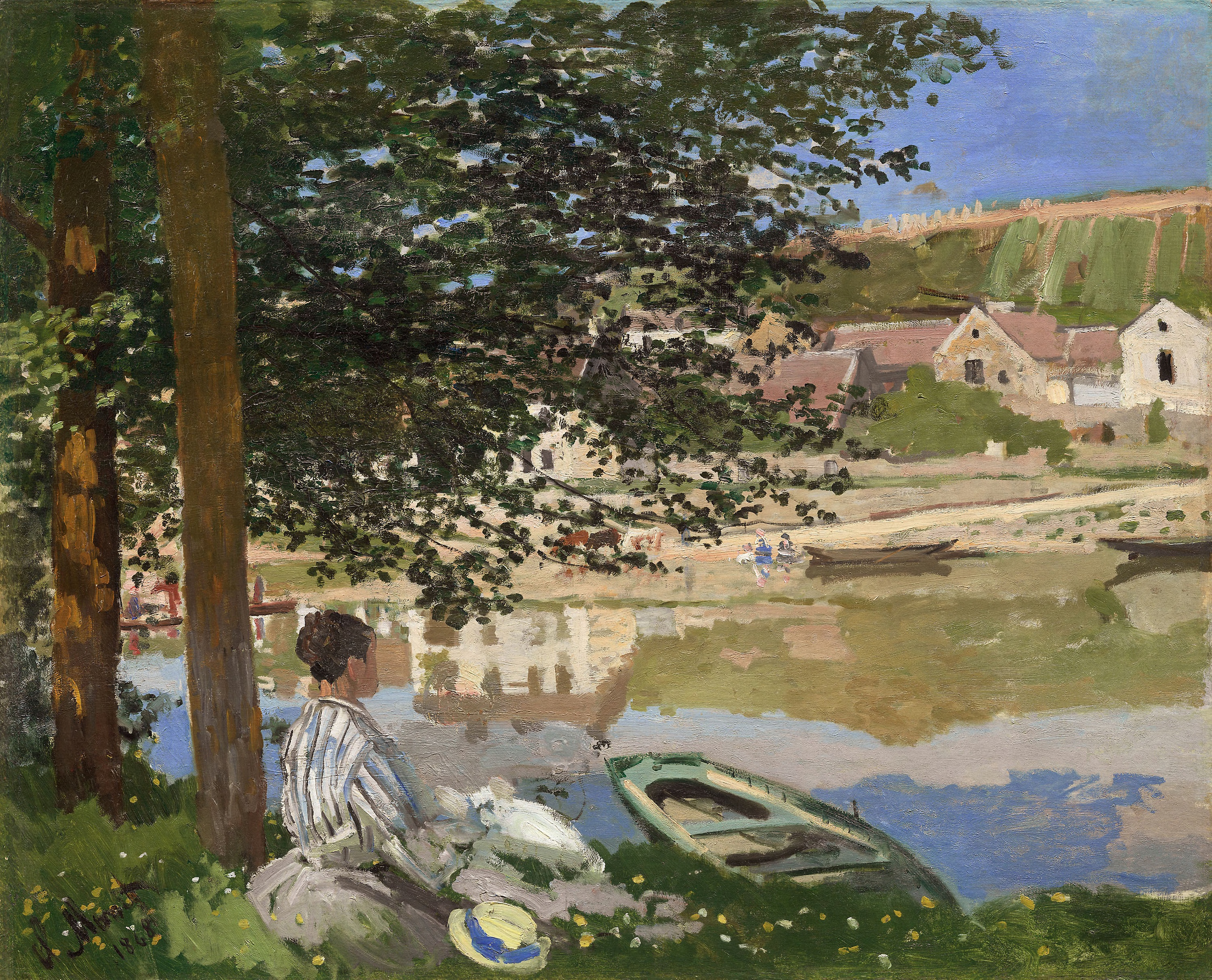
River Scene at Bennecourt, Seine, 1868

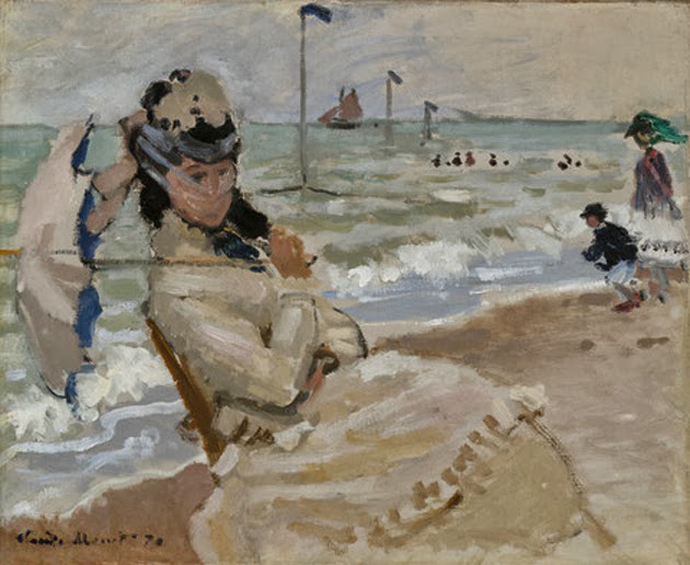
Camille on the Beach in Trouville, 1870, painted during their honeymoon

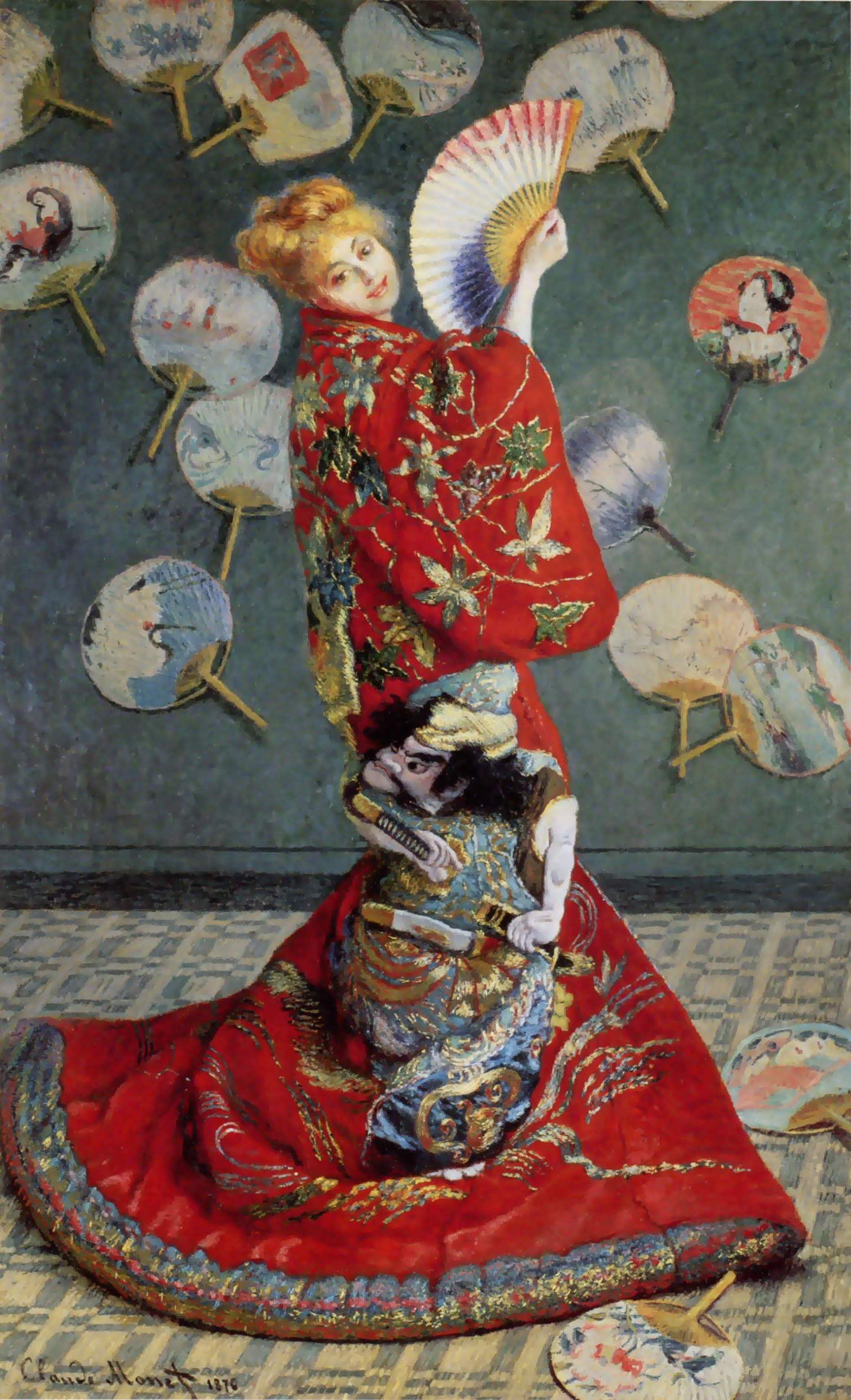
Camille in Japanese costume, 1876

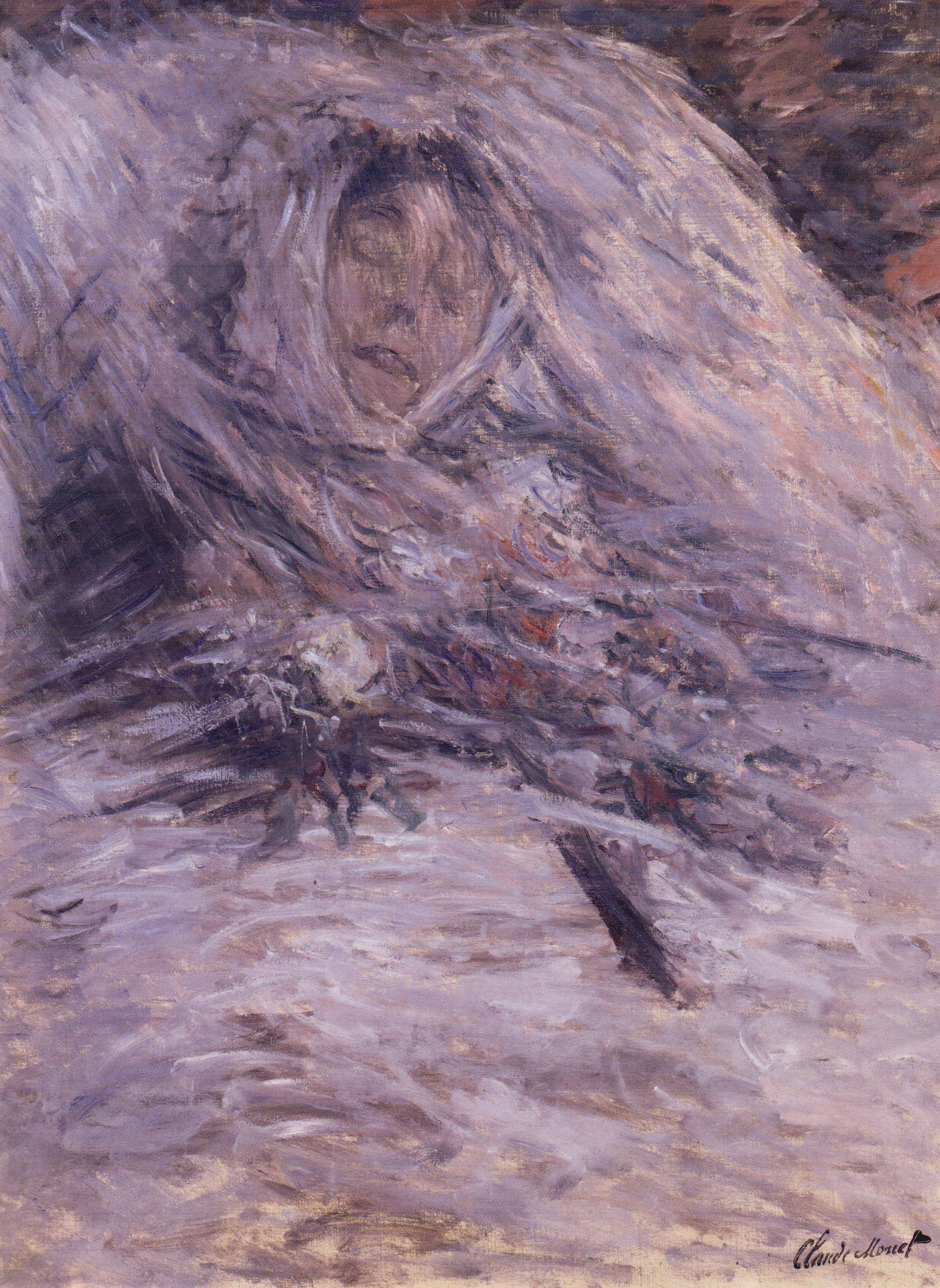
Camille Monet on her deathbed, 1879

In Paris on 8 August 1867, Camille Doncieux gave birth to Jean, her first son with Claude Monet. Claude, who had spent the summer in Sainte-Adresse visiting his father and aunt Sophie Lecadre, returned to Paris for the birth and stayed for several days before returning to Sainte-Adresse. He returned to Paris at the end of the year for the holidays and stayed in the cold one-room apartment that Camille shared with Jean. In 1868 Monet went to live with Camille and Jean in Paris, hiding that fact from his father and aunt who thought he had abandoned "his mistress and child". To escape his creditors and live in a less expensive place, in the spring the three moved to Gloton, a small scenic village near Bennecourt. They were thrown out of the inn where they were staying for non-payment. Camille and Jean were able to stay with someone in the country, while Monet tried to obtain monies for survival.

Camille and Monet were married on 28 June 1870 in the 8th arrondissement of Paris in a civil ceremony. Painter Gustave Courbet was a witness. Although Monet's father was not present because he did not approve of the marriage, Camille's parents attended the ceremony. Upon her marriage, Camille received a 1,200 franc dowry, which represented two years interest on a principal investment that she would receive upon her father's death. Her parents stipulated that the money should be kept in a separate account in Camille's name, to protect the money from Claude Monet's creditors. The couple took their son Jean with them on their honeymoon to Trouville-sur-Mer and stayed at the Hotel Trivoli. Continuing to avoid creditors, Monet also sought to avoid being drafted to serve during the Franco-Prussian War. He left his bride and son to go to Le Havre to visit his ailing father and then on to England, "presumably" with money given to him by his father. Camille and Jean met up with him in England in October 1870.

They lived at Bath Place, later Kensington High Street, London, by early 1871. It was here that Monet made the only painting of Camille by him in London. Entitled Repose, she sat in a chaise longue with a book on her lap.

In 1871, the family moved to a rented house in the Paris suburb of Argenteuil, where they lived for seven years, from 1871 to 1878. Many of Monet's paintings of her were done in this period. In 1878 they moved to the village of Vétheuil.

Monet's patrons Ernest and Alice Hoschedé came to live with the Monets after the rich family lost their fortune due to an "extravagant lifestyle". They lived with them first in Vétheuil and then the two families moved to a larger house on the road from Vétheuil to La Roche-Guyon that would support the 12 member Hoschedé and Monet families and a "handful of servants".

Their second son, Michel was born on 17 March 1878, and Camille's poor health worsened.

== Illness and death ==
Camille became ill after the Hoschedés family came to live with the Monets. Much of the money that Monet had made on the sale of his paintings had to be used for her medical care. Alice nursed her during her illness.

On her deathbed, last rites were given on 31 August 1879 by a priest who also religiously sanctioned the Monets' civil marriage.

The cause of Camille's death remains uncertain. It may have been pelvic cancer, tuberculosis, or possibly a botched abortion. She died on 5 September 1879 in Vétheuil at the age of 32. Monet painted her on her deathbed.

== Art subject ==
Camille features in fifty of Monet's paintings, including for the painting Camille (The Woman in the Green Dress), which received critical acclaim at the Paris salon and earned him 800 francs when sold to Arsène Houssaye. In addition to being Monet's muse and favoured model, she also modelled for Pierre-Auguste Renoir and Édouard Manet.

=== Paintings by Claude Monet ===
The following is a list of paintings made of Camille:

- Luncheon on the Grass (center), 1865
- The Walk (Bazille and Camille), 1865
- Camille with a Small Dog, 1866
- Camille or The Woman in a Green Dress, 1866
- Women in the Garden, 1866
- Interior, after Dinner, 1868
- River Scene at Bennecourt, 1868
- The Landing Stage, 1869
- Camille Sitting on the Beach at Trouville, 1870
- Camille at the Beach at Trouville, 1870
- Camille on the Beach, 1870
- Madame Monet on a Couch, 1871
- Springtime, 1872
- Lilacs in the Sun, 1872
- The Red Kerchief: Portrait of Mrs. Monet, 1873
- The Bench, 1873
- Ripose under the Lilacs, 1873
- The Artist's House at Argenteuil, 1873
- Poppy Field near Argenteuil, 1873
- Camille Monet at a Window, Argenteuil, 1873
- The Walk near Argenteuil, 1873
- Camille and Jean Monet at the Garden of Argenteuil, 1873
- Camille in the Garden with Jean, 1873
- Woman Seated on a Bench, 1874
- The Artist's Family in the Garden, 1875
- Camille Monet and a Child in the Artist’s Garden in Argenteuil, 1875
- Madame Monet Embroidering, 1875
- Woman with a Parasol - Madame Monet and Her Son, 1875
- Rounded Flower Bed (Corbeille de fleurs), 1876
- Camille Monet in Japanese Costume, 1876
- Camille in the Garden at Argenteuil, 1876
- Woman in Garden, 1876
- In the Meadow, 1876
- The Garden, Hollyhocks, 1877
- Portrait of Camille with a bouquet of violets, 1877
- Camille on her Deathbed, 1879

== Gallery ==
Paintings by Claude Monet

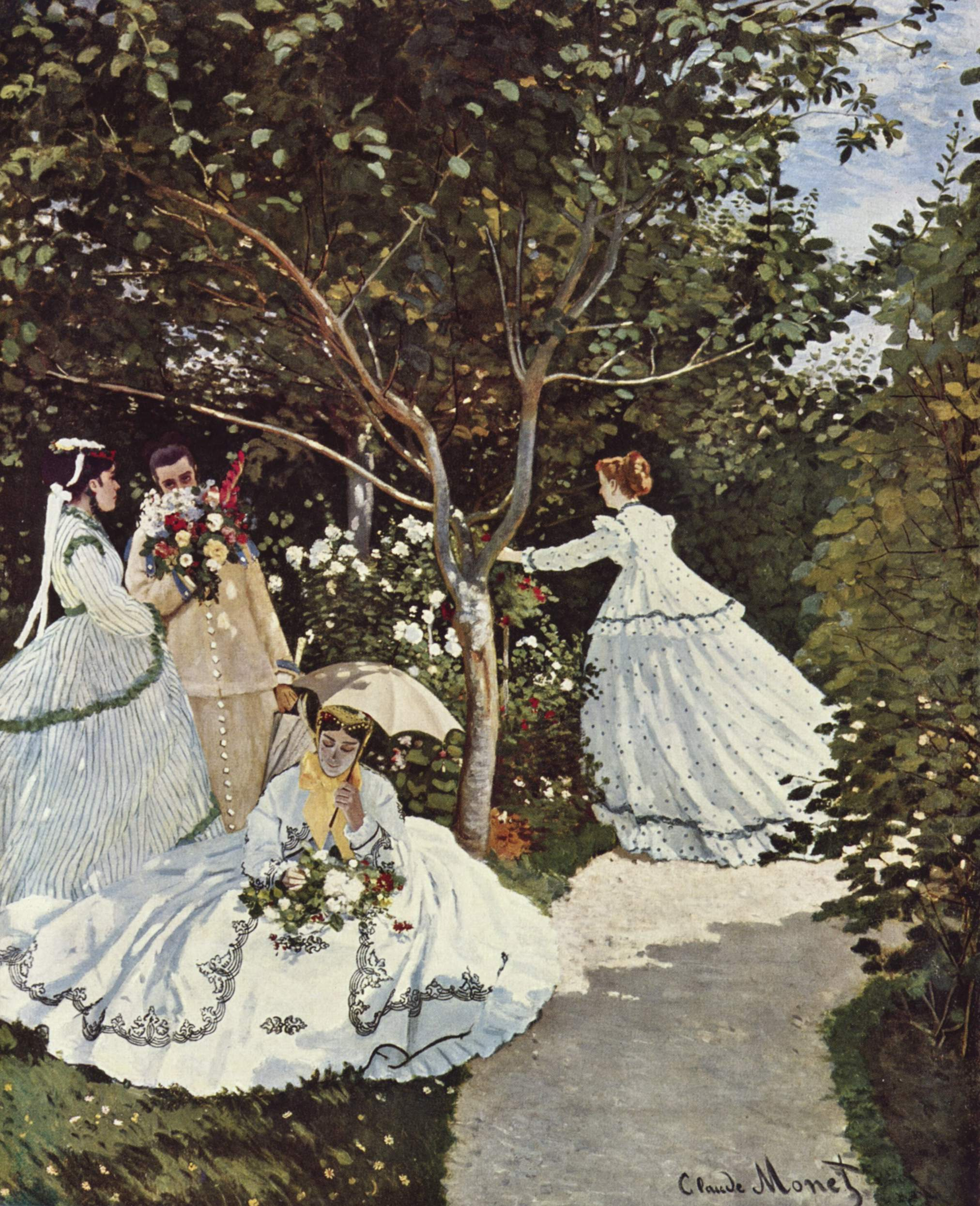
Women in the Garden, 1866

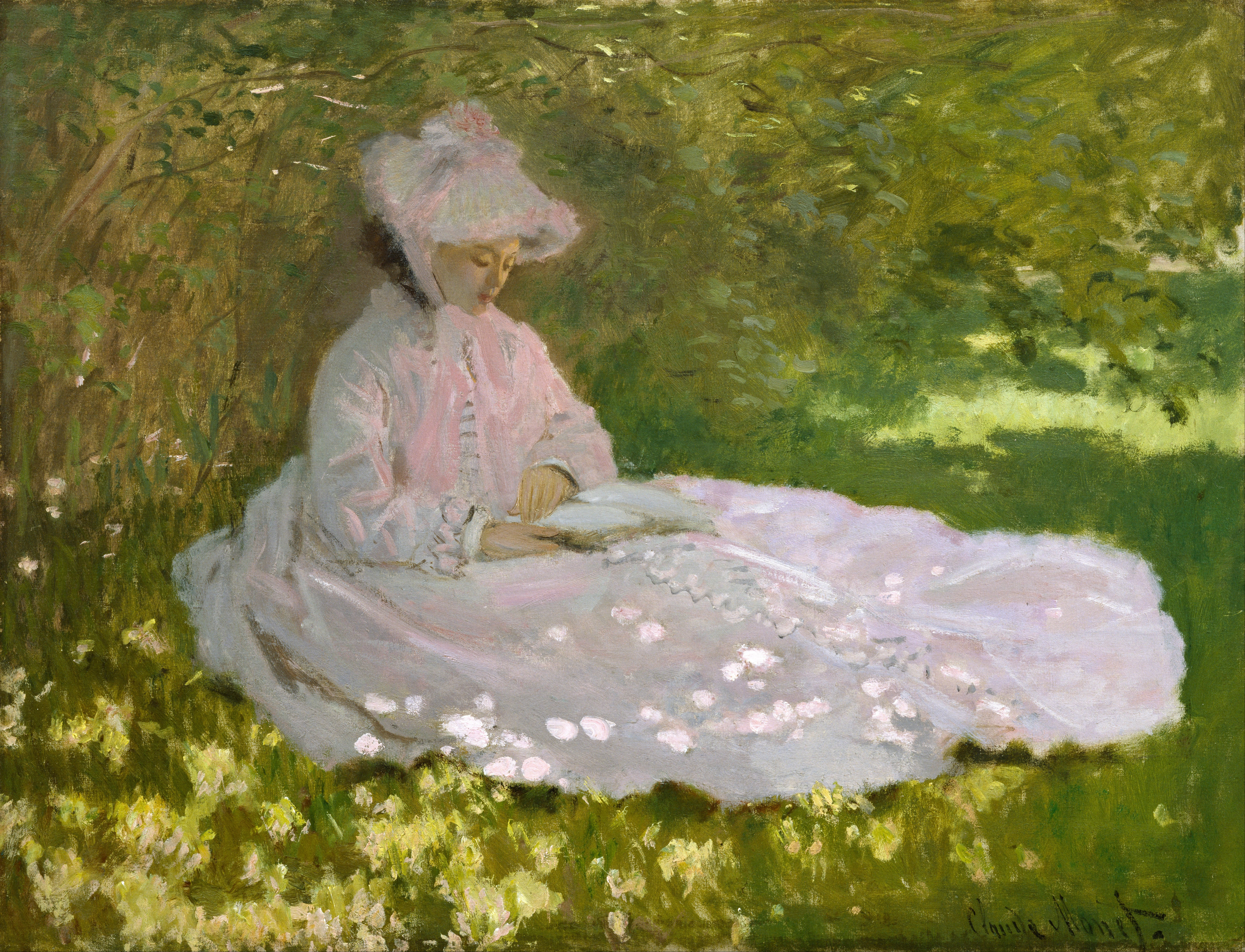
Springtime, 1872

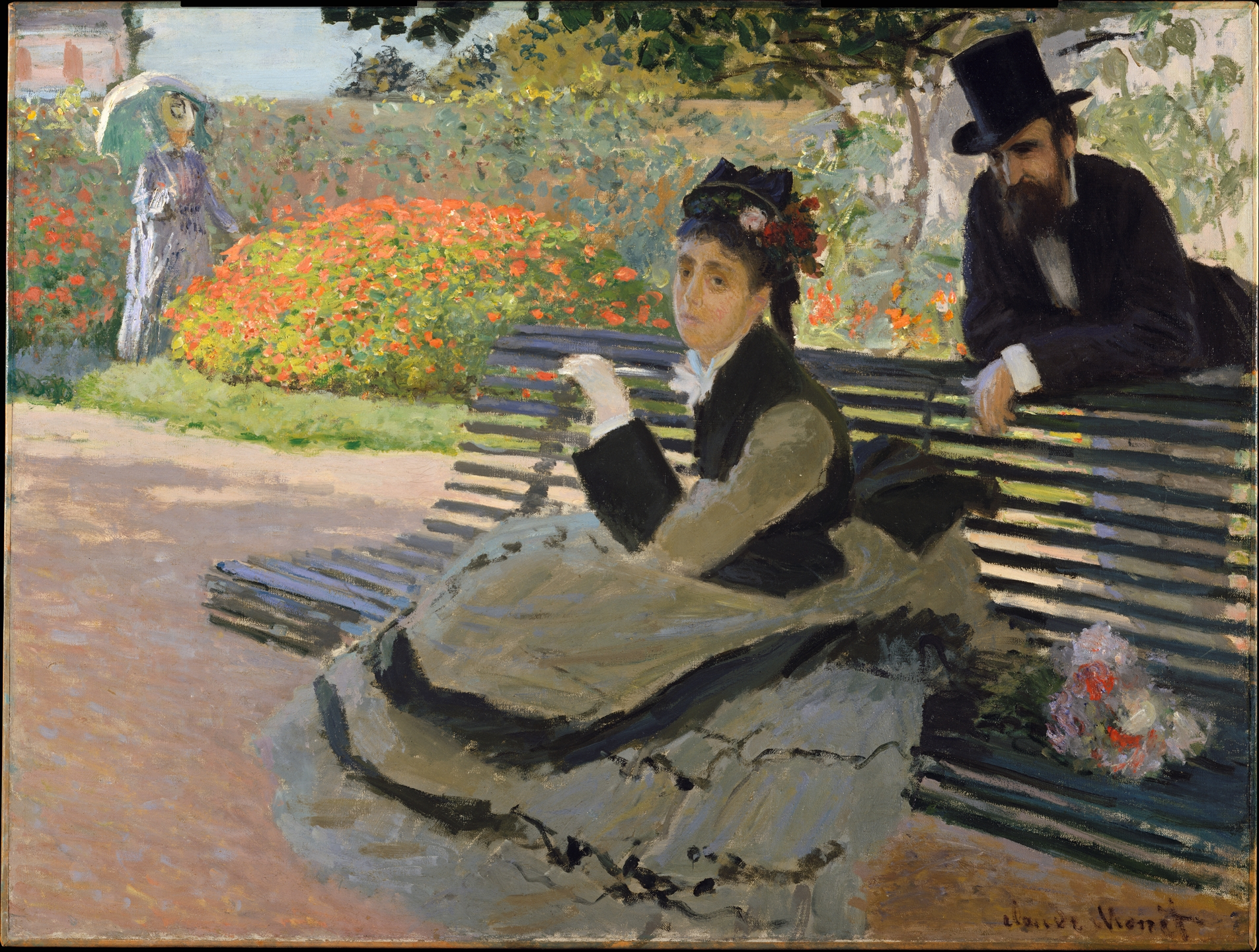
Camille Monet on a Garden Bench, 1873

The Red Kerchief, 1873

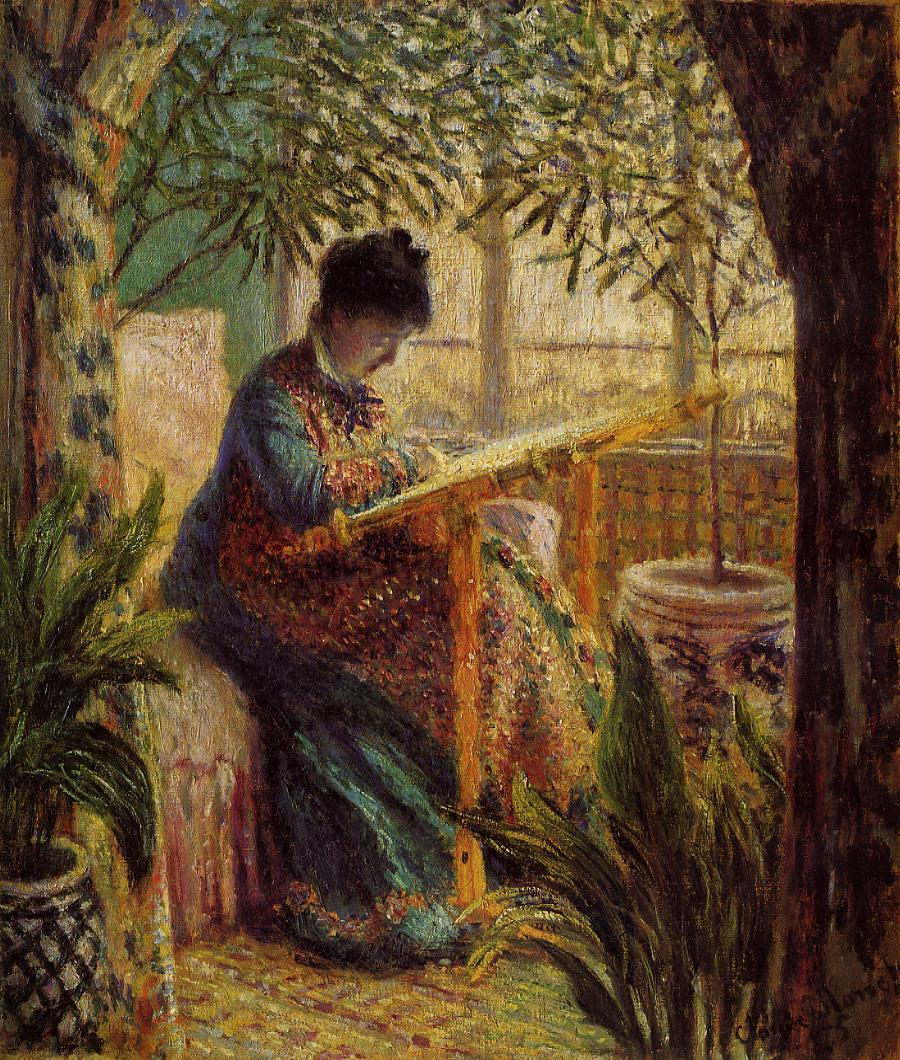
Camille au métier, 1875

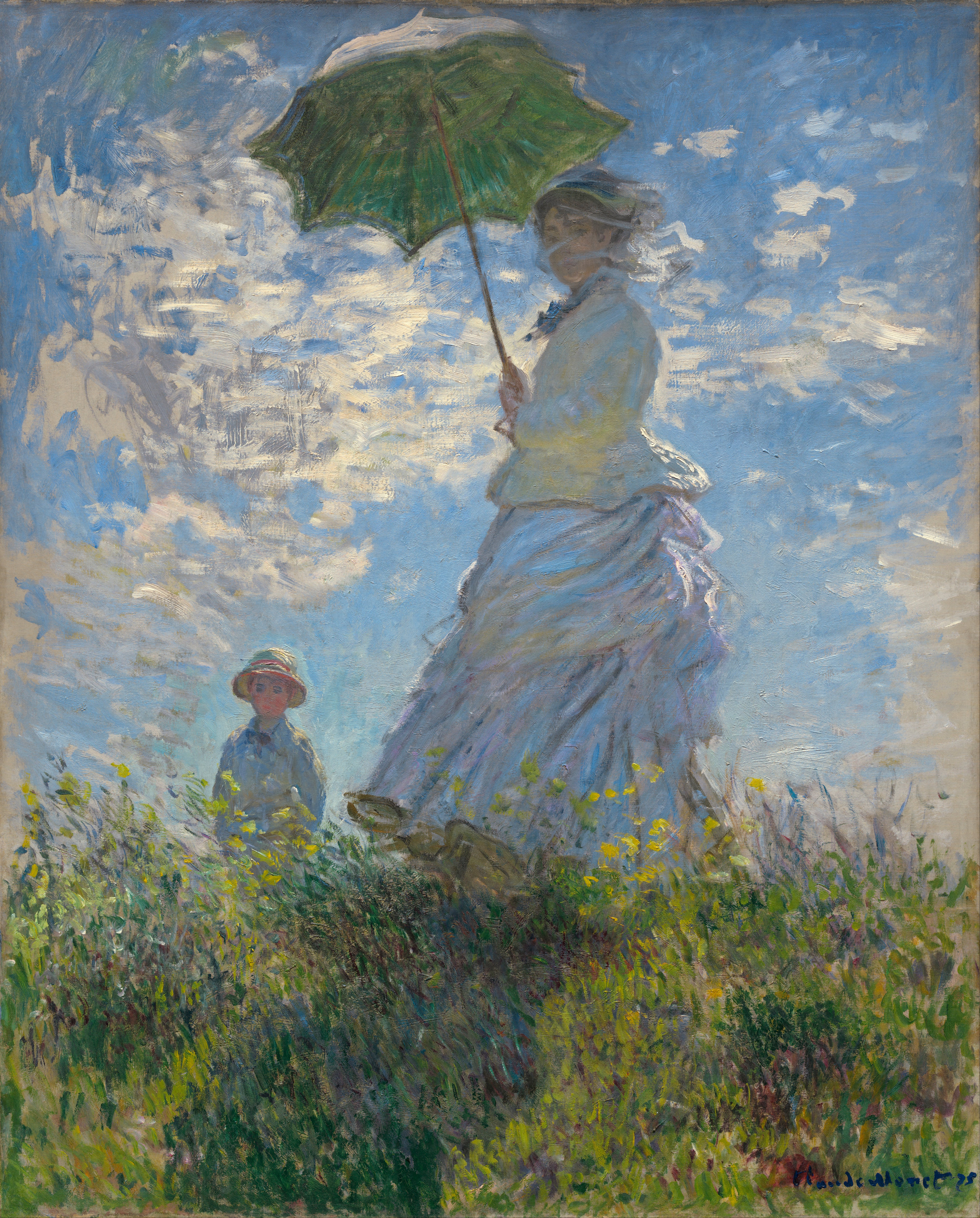
Woman with a Parasol - Madame Monet and Her Son, 1875

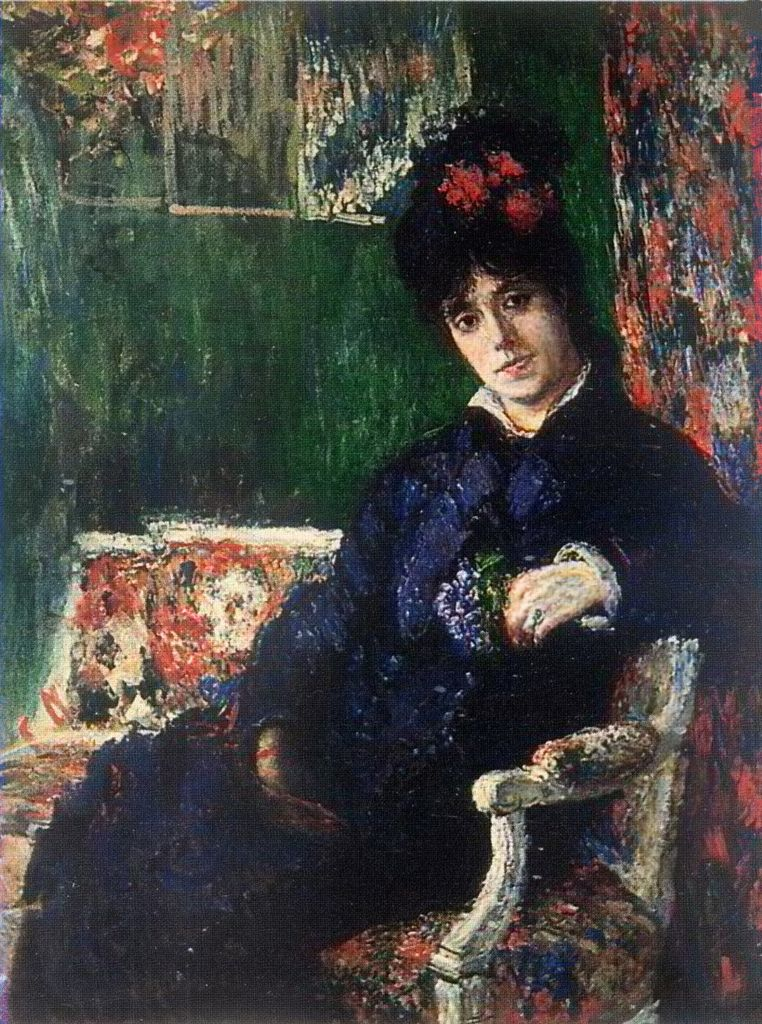
Portrait of Camille with a bouquet of violets, 1877
Paintings by other artists

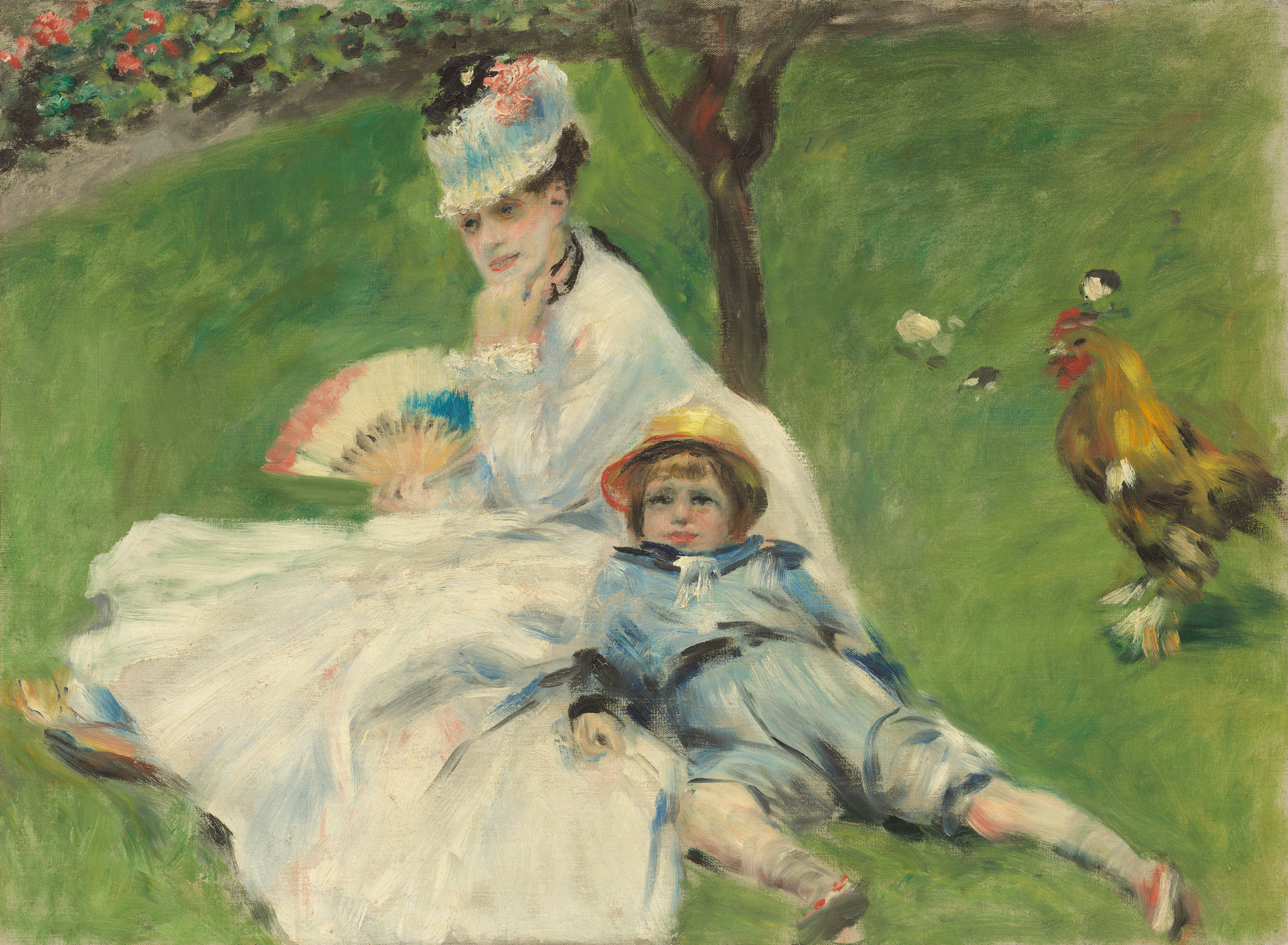
Pierre-Auguste Renoir, Madame Monet and her son, 1874, National Gallery of Art

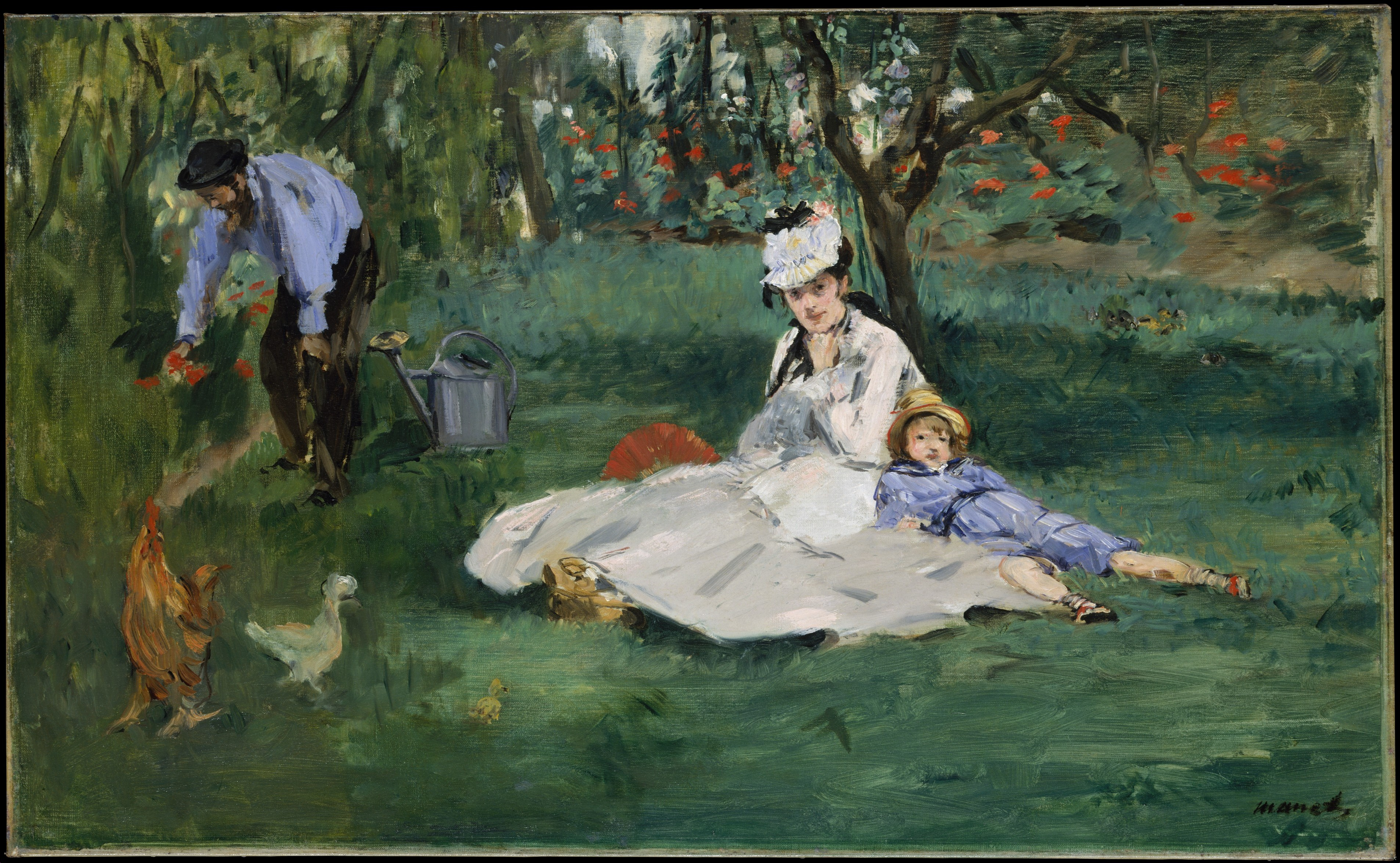
Édouard Manet, The Monet Family in Their Garden at Argenteuil, 1874, Metropolitan Museum of Art
