= La Japonaise (painting) =

1876 painting by Claude Monet

- Artist: Claude Monet
- Year: 1876
- Type: Oil
- Medium: Canvas
- Dimensions: 231.8 cm × 142.3 cm (91 1/4 in × 56 in)
- Location: Museum of Fine Arts, Boston

La Japonaise is an 1876 oil painting by the French Impressionist painter Claude Monet. Painted on a 231.8 cm × 142.3 cm (91 1/4 in × 56 in) canvas, the full-length portrait depicts a European woman in a red uchikake kimono standing in front of a wall decorated by Japanese fans. Monet's first wife Camille Doncieux modeled for the painting.

The painting was first exhibited in the second Impressionism exhibition of 1876, and is now exhibited at the Museum of Fine Arts, Boston.

== Description ==
In the painting, Monet depicts Camille in a padded, heavily decorated red kimono (an uchikake) belonging to a famous Japanese actor, standing on a Japanese-style tatami mat and in front of a wall decorated by Japanese uchiwa fans. Camille, whose hair is dark, wears a blonde wig, emphasizing her identity as a European woman, indicating that the painting shows the performance of Japanese culture rather than attempting to recreate an authentic Japanese environment.

Camille's body, turned in profile, shows her face turned towards the viewer, a gesture likely inspired by gestures found in traditional Japanese dance; Illustrations depicting Japanese dance, such as Charles Wirgman's A Japanese dinner party, were popular in Europe at the time, and would likely have been available for Monet to draw inspiration from.

Monet placed particular importance in the depiction of the detailed samurai embroidery on Camille's robe, positioning the face of the samurai in the near centre of the canvas. The depiction of the samurai, with dark hair, a stern facial expression and a strong grip on the sword in his belt, contrast Camille - with blonde hair, holding a fan delicately and smiling - strongly, drawing attention again to the difference between the "Japanese" setting and the European woman within it. Camille's raised right-hand holds a folding fan in the colours of the French flag, which also appeared in one of Renoir's paintings.

The contrast between Camille and the painting's faux-cultural setting is increased further by a backdrop of uchiwa fans. Though most depict only hazy Impressionist landscapes, with one on the left showing a red-crowned crane, a fan to the right of Camille's raised right-hand shows a Japanese woman wearing a kimono and a traditional hairstyle, depicted on a rosy red background. Separated from the others with a contrasting background, it draws attention as the woman's face tilts in the opposite direction to Camille's, echoing the other. While Camille looks out at the viewer with a smile, the woman in the fan shows an almost astonished facial expression looking at her European counterpart.

== Motivation ==
Money became one of Monet's biggest troubles in the 1860s. His father had cut his allowance due to Monet's rebellious decision to create works unsuitable for the state-sponsored Salon exhibitions. Although Monet's financial condition improved in the early 1870s after his works were recognized and regularly purchased by art dealer Paul Durand-Ruel, this support began to erode due to Durand-Ruel's difficulty in selling them; due to the loss of this important source of income and the expenses Monet faced in moving into a new house, beginning in 1874, he began to fall back into financial difficulty.

In desperate need of money, Monet created this painting of his wife in a red kimono that he borrowed from a friend, and sent the painting to Durand-Ruel's gallery in the second Impressionism exhibition of 1876, along with 18 other paintings, including the famous Woman with a Parasol - Madame Monet and Her Son. Given the popularity of Japonisme in France at this time, Monet hoped to sell La Japonaise at a high price to ease his financial difficulties.

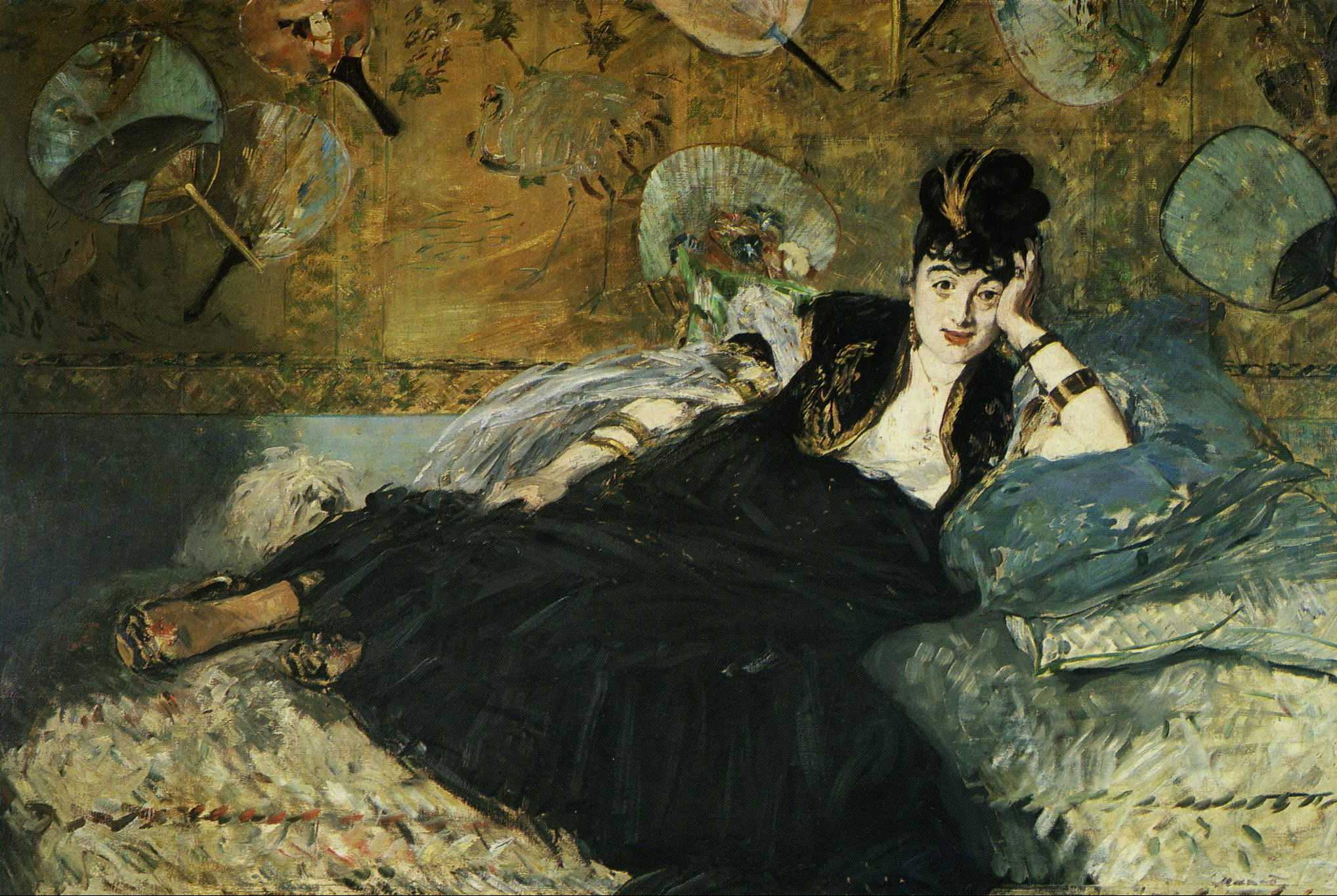
The Lady with the Fans (La Dame aux éventails) by Édouard Manet, 1873

Forty years later, in 1918, when the art dealers Georges Bernheim and René Gimpel visited Monet and informed him that La Japonaise had sold for a very decent price, Monet was said to state that he was ashamed by the fact of having painted the work simply to please the market, calling it "a piece of filth". Some scholars believe that he may have been more committed to this subject than these comments would suggest; when the work was in progress, Monet wrote to Philippe Burty, a famous art critic and collector of Japanese artworks, commenting that it was "superb" to paint the heavily detailed kimono. Other scholars argue that this letter may have been an "advertisement" instead of Monet's true words, and motivated by a desire to influence notable critics who held an interest in Japonisme such as Burty.

Another possible motivation for the creation of this painting is that Monet wished to "compete" with his friend Édouard Manet's work The Lady with the Fans, modeled by Nina de Callias in 1873. There is no solid evidence that Monet had seen this work in person before he painted the La Japonaise, but he seemed to know of it from an engraving of Manet's sketch of the work, published in the book Revue du monde nouveau in February 1874. An 1876 review in the journal Le Soleil even described Monet's works as "following suit".

== Criticism ==
After being exhibited in the second Impressionism exhibition in 1876, the painting received attention, though not always positive, from art critics. Critics Émile Zola and Alexandre Pothey praised the work for its innovation and bold use of colors, but many critics described the work as "bizarre" and sexually suggestive. The critic Simon Boubée wrote in his review: "He has shown a Chinese in a red robe with two heads, one is that of a demimondaine placed on the shoulders, the other that of a monster, placed we dare not say where." Other writers pointed out the placement of the samurai's head on the robe as being suggestive, coupled with the depiction of unsheathing his sword. Camille's "coquettish" facial expression was also said to be part of the erotic symbolism.

The criticism seemed to embarrass Monet, who likely withdrew the work from the exhibition before its end to prevent public viewing, though he claimed the work had been purchased by a secret buyer at the unbelievably high price of 2,020 francs. Many art historians have questioned the authenticity of this record-breaking price, with a variety of different explanations. Some believe that it was a publicity stunt played by Monet and Ernest Hoschedé; that Hoschedé bought it at a high price and Monet secretly repurchased it back. Another art historian believes that the purchase was a "face-saving fable" to move the public attention away from the embarrassing criticism. The hypothesis that the unprecedentedly high price was not real offers an explanation for the content in a letter from Monet to his friend Édouard Manet, in which the painting was mentioned. Monet wrote:

"I would be very obliged to you if you would not repeat to anyone what I told you on the subject of La Japonaise. I have promised to keep it quiet, it would inconvenience me. I count, then, on your discretion and, in case you may already have dropped a word to Dubois, recommend to him the most complete silence, otherwise, there would be endless gossip and annoyances for me."

It is possible that Monet had informed Manet of his trick, and that he had warned him not to tell anyone else, or that Monet wanted to hide from the public the painting Camille had modeled for, given the criticism of the painting's sexually suggestive nature, though no one mentioned Camille's name in connection with the work until Monet revealed her role to Georges Bernheim and René Gimpel in 1918, the blond wig having disguised her identity until this point.

Monet himself did not have a high opinion of the work, describing it to Bernheim and Gimpel as "une saleté [a piece of junk]". The mixed reception has continued to the twenty-first century, with critics such as Julian Barnes, in a generally enthusiastic introduction to Monet, singling out the piece as "ferociously awful". The MFA curator notes, by contrast, describe it as "a virtuoso display of brilliant color that is also a witty comment on the [then] current Paris fad for all things Japanese".

== 'Kimono Wednesday' controversy ==
In 2015, the Museum of Fine Arts, Boston held a special program called "Kimono Wednesdays" in which visitors were invited to pose in front of La Japonaise while wearing a replica of the kimono in the painting. The kimono, made in Kyoto, was offered by NHK, the Japanese cosponsor of the initiative. The kimono was first exhibited in several Japanese cities, and visitors to the exhibition were invited to pose for photos wearing the kimono.

The MFA brought the kimono to Boston and continued the activities that had taken place in Japan. The event drew criticism from protesters, mainly Chinese-Americans, who described the program as an example of Orientalism and white supremacy, accusing the museum of having "insufficiently [grappled] with [the painting’s] post-colonial legacy". As part of the protest, a Tumblr blog titled "Decolonize Our Museums" criticized the "Kimono Wednesday" event as a form of "cultural appropriation", and described it as "enacted by a historically white institution that retains the 'power to represent—and therefore dominate—other ethnic and cultural groups'".

Although the museum stopped allowing visitors to wear the kimono in response to the criticisms, the program was defended by some, with Japan's deputy consul general telling the press that the protest did not make sense from a Japanese perspective. Japanese counter-protesters led by Timothy Nagaoka visited the exhibition wearing their own kimono after the MFA stopped allowing visitors to pose wearing the replica, arguing that kimono could be enjoyed by people of all ethnicities, not only the Japanese. Meiji University professor Shaun O'Dwyer also defended the program, citing his concern about the shrinking nature of the traditional kimono-making industry, and the need for any possible publicity for its survival.

Monet chose the subject of Japonisme partially for its popularity in the Parisian art market in the 1870s, with his later works reflecting a deeper level of understanding and application of Japanese aesthetics, compared to the comparatively surface-level depiction shown in La Japonaise.

== Provenance ==
- April 14, 1876, Monet and Ernest Hoschedé sale, Hôtel Drouot, Paris, lot 37
- April 19, 1877, anonymous ("L.") sale, Hôtel Drouot, Paris, lot 48, to Constantin de Rasty (d. 1923), Paris
- 1918, sold by Rasty to Paul Rosenberg and Co., Paris and New York
- 1920, sold by Rosenberg to Philip Lehman (b. 1861 - d. 1947), New York
- 1921, sold by Lehman to Duveen Brothers, Inc., London; 1937, shipped from Duveen, London to Duveen, New York
- March 8, 1956, sold by Duveen to the MFA for $45,000

== See also ==
- List of paintings by Claude Monet
