= Bennecourt =

- Commune
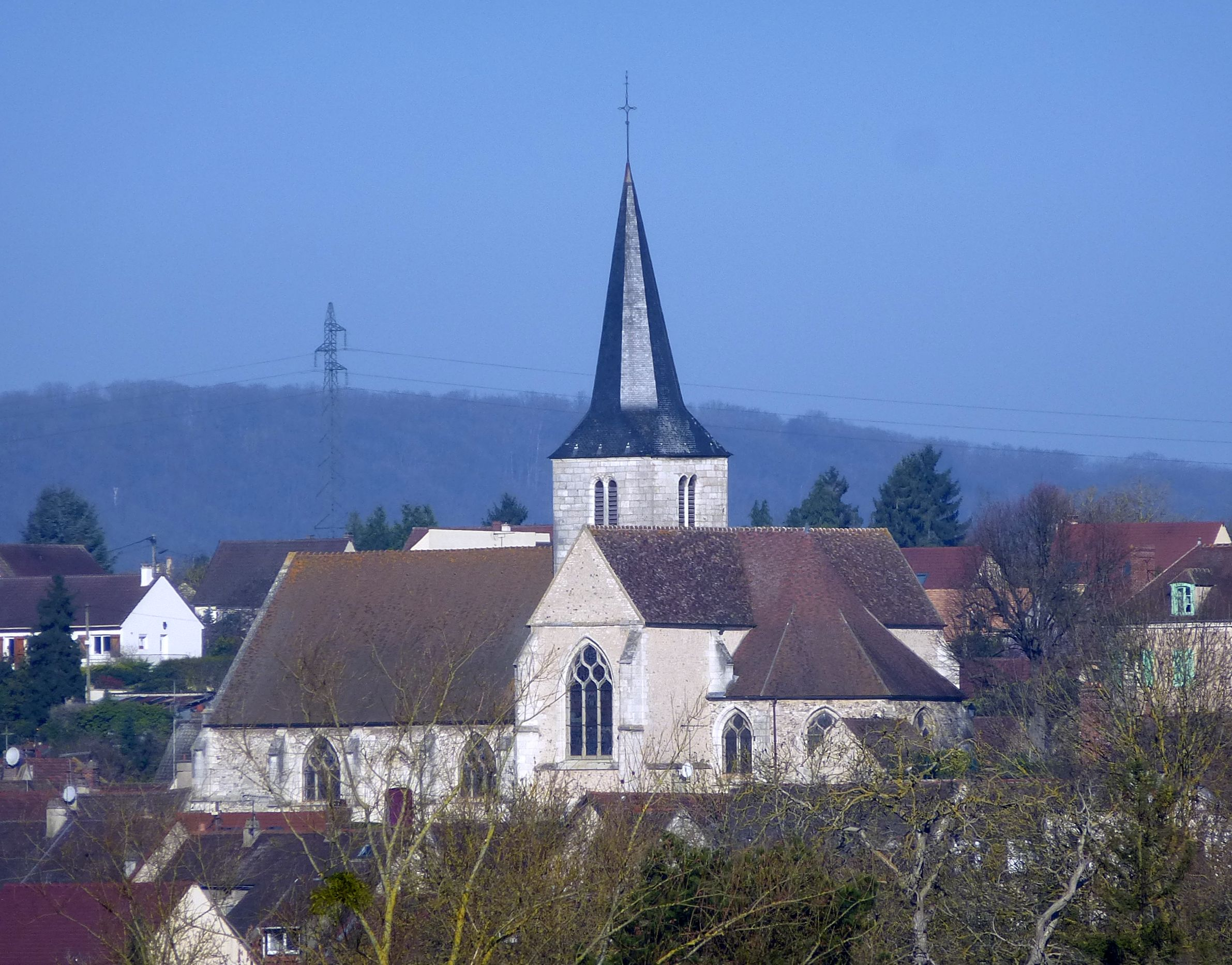
- The church of Saint-Ouen, in Bennecourt

- Coat of arms
- Location of Bennecourt
- Location within France Location within Île-de-France (region)
- Coordinates: 49°02′24″N 1°33′47″E
- Country: France
- Region: Île-de-France
- Department: Yvelines
- Arrondissement: Mantes-la-Jolie
- Canton: Bonnières-sur-Seine
- Intercommunality: Portes de l'Île-de-France

Government
  - Mayor (2020–2026): Didier Dumont
- Area^{1}: 6.95 km^{2} (2.68 sq mi)
- Elevation: 19 m (62 ft)
- Highest elevation: 120 m (390 ft)
- Lowest elevation: 10 m (33 ft)
- Population (2023): 1,747
  - Density: 251/km^{2} (651/sq mi)
- Time zone: UTC+01:00 (CET)
  - Summer (DST): UTC+02:00 (CEST)
- INSEE/Postal code: 78057 /78270
- ^{1} French Land Register data, which excludes lakes, ponds, glaciers > 1 km^{2} (0.386 sq mi or 247 acres) and river estuaries.

Bennecourt (French pronunciation: [bɛnkuʁ]) is a commune in the Yvelines department in north-central France.

== See also ==
- Communes of the Yvelines department
