= Women in the Garden =

1886 painting by Claude Monet

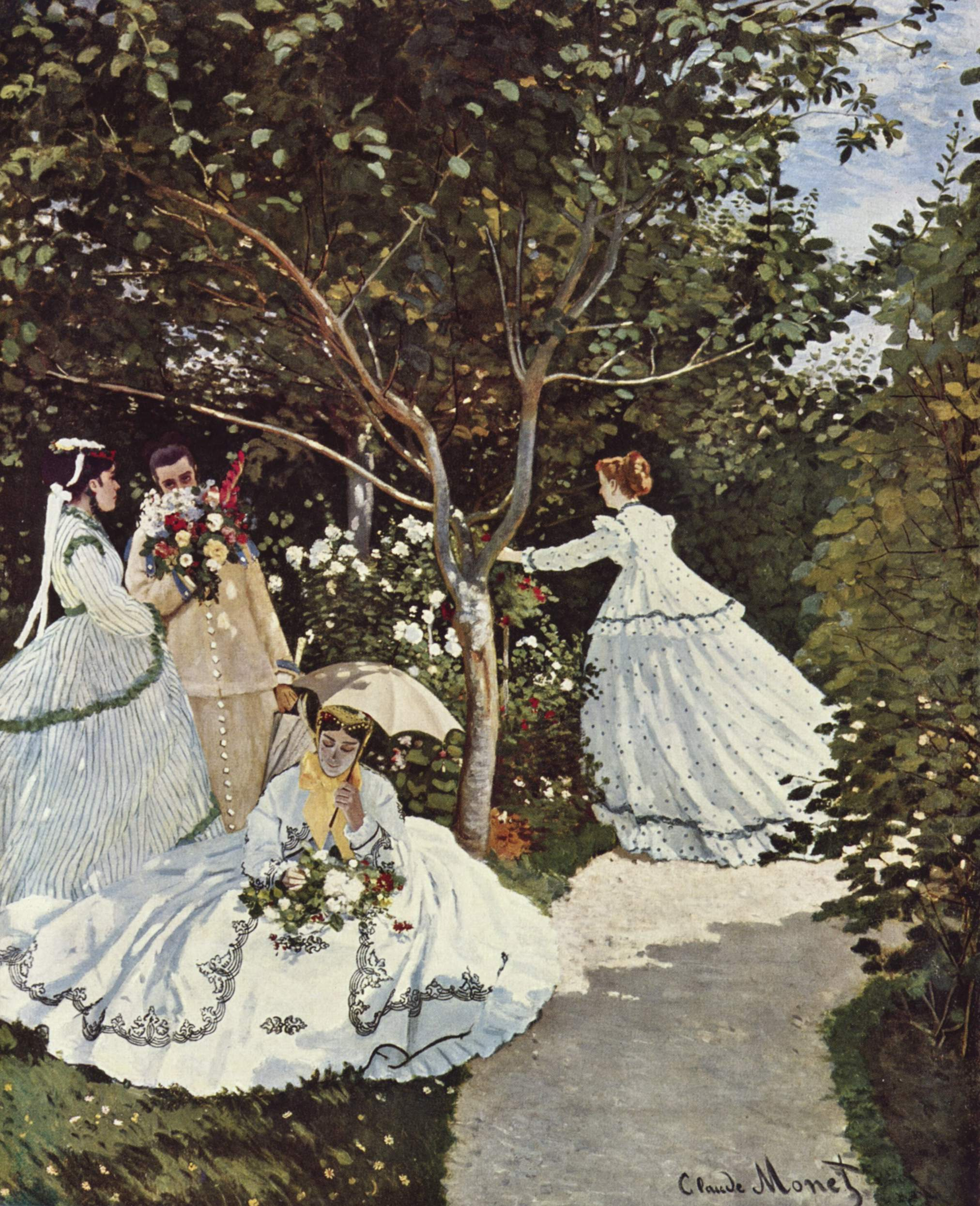
- Artist: Claude Monet
- Year: 1866
- Medium: oil paint, canvas
- Dimensions: 255 cm (100 in) × 205 cm (81 in)
- Location: Musée d'Orsay, France

Women in the Garden (French: Femmes au jardin) is an oil painting begun in 1866 by French artist Claude Monet when he was 26. It is a large work painted en plein air; the size of the canvas necessitated Monet painting its upper half with the canvas lowered into a trench he had dug, so that he could maintain a single point of view for the entire work. The setting is the garden of a property he was renting. His companion and future wife Camille Doncieux posed for the figures. Monet finished the work indoors, and used magazine illustrations to render fashionable clothing.

Monet at this time was early in his career, experimenting with method and subject matter. His earlier paintings were successful at Paris Salons, but Women in the Garden was rejected in 1867 on the grounds of subject and narrative weakness. This piece is simply a work that was meant to fit within his theme: the interplay of light and atmosphere. His paintings established him as a leader emerging the impressionist movement. The Salon was also troubled by Monet's heavy brushstrokes, a style which would, of course, become one of the hallmarks of Impressionism. A judge commented, "Too many young people think of nothing but continuing in this abominable direction. It is high time to protect them and save art!" The painting was purchased by fellow artist Frédéric Bazille to help support Monet at a time when he had no money.

Although the Musée d'Orsay, the painting's owner, comments that "Monet has skilfully rendered the white of the dresses, anchoring them firmly in the structure of the composition", Christoph Heinrich, author of a Monet biography, notes how posterity has found the painting lacking. In this view, the figures appear poorly integrated into the scene, with the woman at right "gliding across the ground as if she had a trolley concealed beneath her dress". The painting's treatment of light and shadow is lauded, however, and in this respect the work may have shown Monet where his artistic path lay.

== Braun-Vega's appropriations ==
In 1984, Herman Braun-Vega incorporated Women in the Garden with The Balcony by Manet into an enlarged composition in the foreground of which two poor Peruvian women are seated waiting to sell some vegetable plants piled in front of them. In this painting, titled En attendant (Monet et Manet), Braun-Vega highlights the contrast between the affluence of the North, represented by the Sunday-best figures of Manet and Monet, and the poverty of the South, represented by the Peruvian vegetable sellers. Braun-Vega also appropriated Women in the Garden in L'attente (1983), La espera en el campo (1986) and Le temps des cerises (1987).

== See also ==
- List of paintings by Claude Monet
- 100 Great Paintings, 1980 BBC series
