= The Red Cape =

Painting by Claude Monet

- Artist: Claude Monet
- Year: c. 1868–1873
- Medium: Oil on canvas
- Dimensions: 100 cm × 80 cm (39 in × 31 in)
- Location: Cleveland Museum of Art; Cleveland

The Red Cape, also sometimes known as Madame Monet or The Red Kerchief, is an oil-on-canvas snowscape by French impressionist Claude Monet, from c. 1868–1873. The painting depicts Claude Monet's first wife, Camille, dressed in a red cape, passing outside of a window.

Monet painted the painting while living in Argenteuil. The solitary setting at his home there allowed him to paint in relative peace, as well as spend time with his family. It is Monet's only known snowscape painting that features Camille Monet. Since 1958, it has been in the collection of the Cleveland Museum of Art in Cleveland, Ohio.

== See also ==
- List of paintings by Claude Monet
