= The Road in Front of Saint-Simeon Farm in Winter =

1867 painting by Claude Monet

The Road in front of Saint-Simeon Farm in Winter
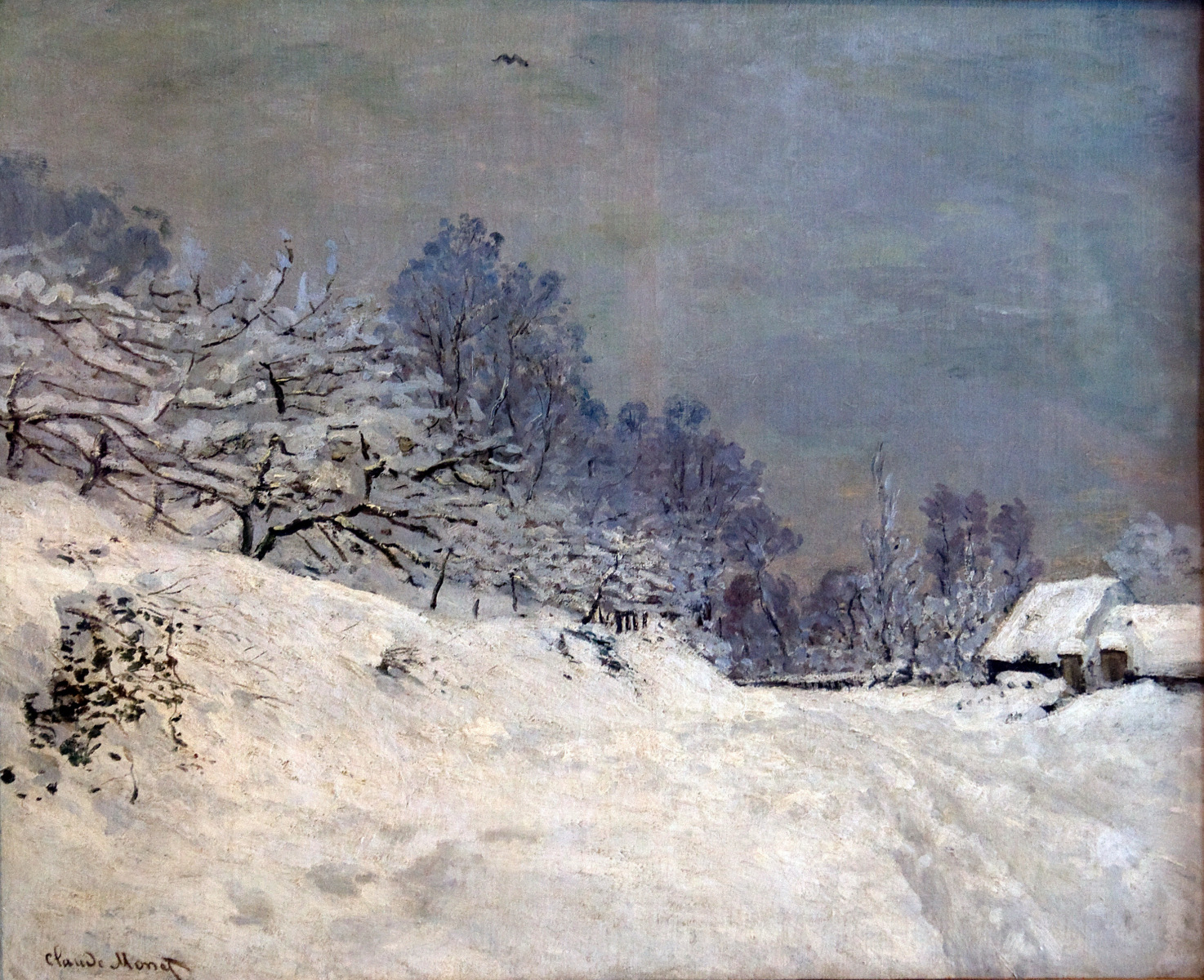
- Artist: Claude Monet
- Year: 1867
- Medium: Oil on canvas
- Dimensions: 49 cm × 65 cm (19 in × 26 in)
- Location: Musée d'Orsay; Paris

The Road in Front of Saint-Simeon Farm in Winter is an 1867 oil-on-canvas snowscape painted by French impressionist Claude Monet. It depicts a snow-covered road in front of a barn, with tracks of a horse cart and various footsteps in the snow. The painting is one of four related works from the winter of 1867, and represents Monet's earliest series. They include this work, followed by Road to the Farm, Saint-Siméon, Honfleur, Road in Front of Saint-Siméon Farm in Winter, and Cart on a Snowy Road at Honfleur.

== Series ==
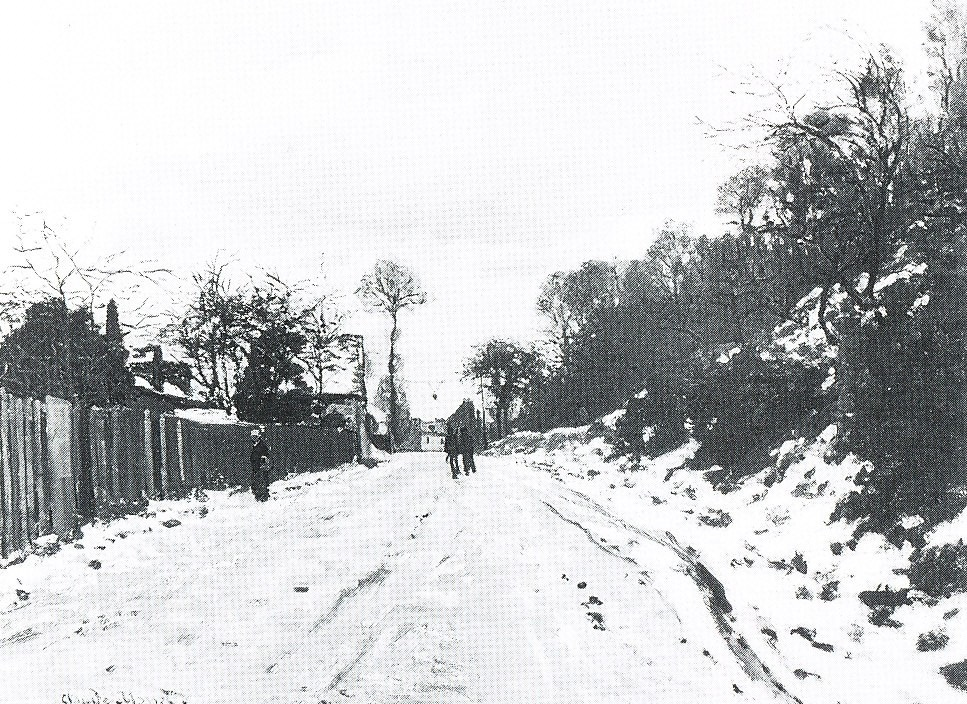
The Snowy Road at Honfleur

== See also ==
- List of paintings by Claude Monet
