= Le Grand Canal (Monet series) =

Series of paintings by Claude Monet

Monet painted 37 works of Venice which he began during his stay in the city in 1908. These include a series of canvases of the Grand Canal. He had the habit of studying the same subject in a varying light, at different times of the day, which resulted during his career in many distinct series, like for example the Water Lilies series, Poplar series, Rouen Cathedral series, Haystacks series and Charing Cross Bridge series.

During his stay in Venice, Monet's accommodation was on the Grand Canal, firstly in the Palazzo Barbaro and secondly in a hotel nearby. He painted six views of this stretch of the waterway, near the church of Santa Maria della Salute. He also painted individual buildings on the Grand Canal such as the Palazzo Dario.

== List of the paintings ==
- All works listed are described as "Painting – oil on canvas".
- The Catalog Nos are Wildenstein Index Numbers as defined by Daniel Wildenstein in the Monet: Catalogue Raisonné.

Painting	Year	Catalog No	Museum	Picture
The Grand Canal	1908	(W.1736)	Fine Arts Museums of San Francisco	
The Grand Canal and Santa Maria della Salute	1908	(W.1737)	Private Collection	
The Grand Canal	1908	(W.1738)	Museum of Fine Arts, Boston	
The Grand Canal	1908	(W.1739)	Nahmad Collection	
The Grand Canal and Santa Maria della Salute	1908	(W.1740)	Private Collection	
The Grand Canal, Venice	1908	(W.1741)	Private Collection	

== Public display ==
In 2018, the National Gallery in London exhibited nine of the Venice paintings, including two paintings of the series, together in a single room, for the duration of a temporary exhibition titled Monet & Architecture, devoted to Claude Monet's use of architecture as a means to structure and enliven his art. This was a rare occurrence because no museum owns or exhibits more than two in a permanent collection.

The two paintings of the series exhibited were the examples from the following collections:

- Fine Arts Museums of San Francisco
- Nahmad Collection, Monaco

== See also ==
- Le Grand Canal
- San Giorgio Maggiore, Monet series
- List of paintings by Claude Monet
