= Le Grand Canal =

1908 painting by Claude Monet

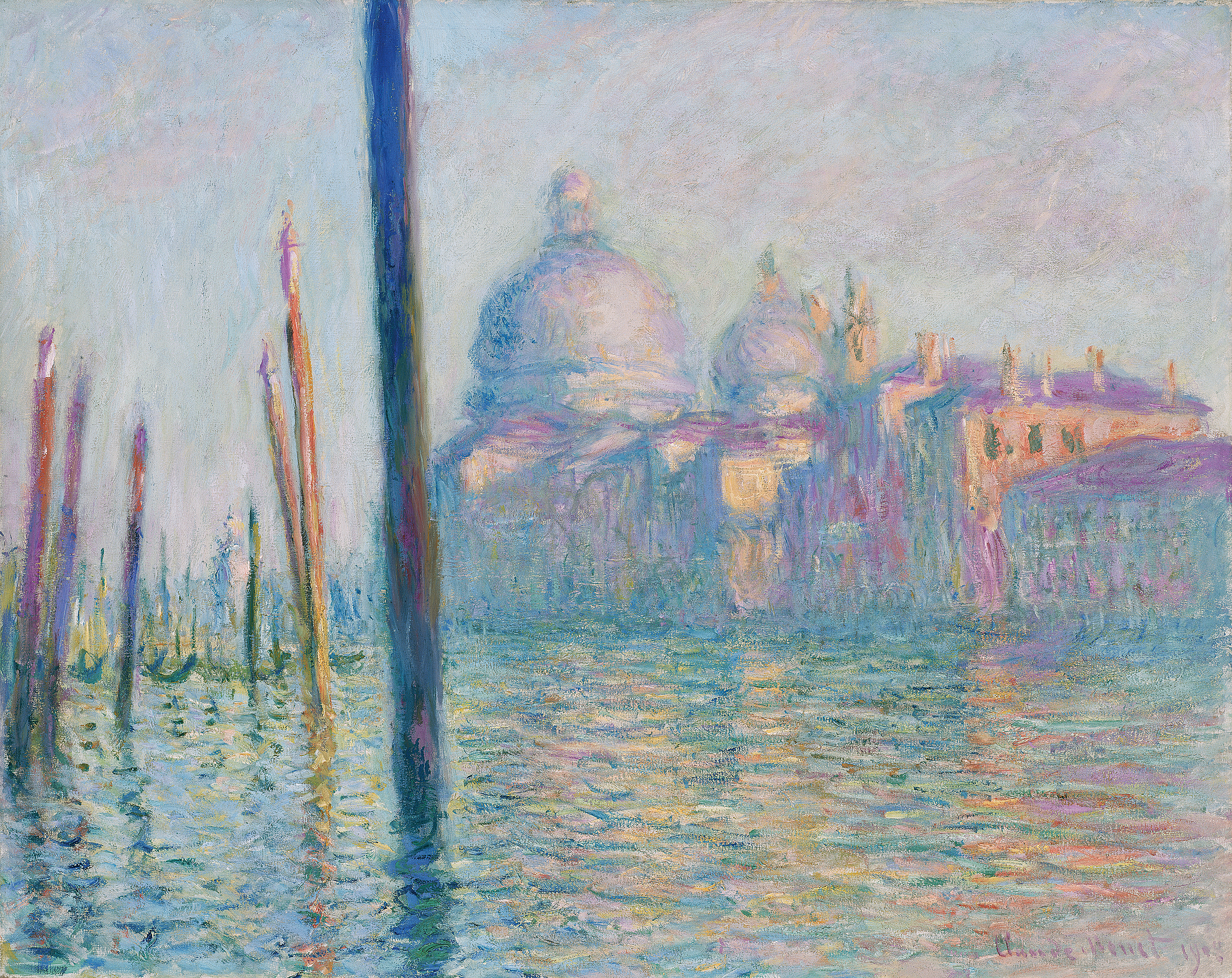
- Artist: Claude Monet
- Year: 1908
- Medium: oil on canvas
- Dimensions: 92.4 cm × 73.7 cm (36.4 in × 29.0 in)
- Location: Museum of Fine Arts; Boston

Le Grand Canal is an oil on canvas painting by French Impressionist painter Claude Monet (1840–1926). It is one of six paintings looking down the Grand Canal towards the Salute church. This Grand Canal series is in turn part of a larger series of paintings of Venice which Monet undertook during 1908 on his only visit to the city. The artist is generally regarded by art historians as being at the peak of his powers at this period. The paintings were begun en plein air and completed in France.

This painting is a classic view of the Grand Canal, an attempt to capture the ever-changing face of Venice, as seen from the Palazzo Barbaro, one of the places where he stayed during his trip.

In 2015, it was sold for more than $35 million at an auction by Sotheby's. Sotheby's called this painting "one of the most celebrated Venice paintings". Previously it has been in the private collection of the New Orleans sugar magnate, Hunt Henderson, who was a noted art collector.

== History ==
This painting was undertaken on Monet's trip to Venice in the autumn of 1908, when the artist responded to an invitation from the American woman Mary Young Hunter, to visit her at the Palazzo Barbaro, in Venice. Monet was 68 years old this year. Hunter was a friend of Monet's wife, Alice, who invited the couple to come to visit her in Venice, where she rented this palazzo. Initially Monet was not keen but he did decide to travel. Monet and his wife arrived in Italy on October 1.

While there Monet completed a series of artwork on the Canale Grande painting the same motif at different times of the day. Monet had the habit of studying the same subject in a varying light, at different times of the day, which resulted during his active career in many distinct Monet series, like for example the Water Lilies series, Poplar series, Rouen Cathedral series, Haystacks series and Charing Cross Bridge series. Monet painted 37 works of Venice during his three-month stay in Italy, from October to December, including this painting and five more depicting the same theme, Canale Grande. One is hosted at the Fine Arts Museums of San Francisco.

== Painting ==
This painting depicts the view from the Palazzo Barbaro. Monet's series introduced a fresh approach to a theme that was painted by many notable artists before him. The series are a pictorial exploration of the light upon the ancient city. The painter captured the sensations according to how the appearance of the motif changed as the light shifted on the water and its surroundings. The painter used the mooring-poles to counterbalance the buildings on the other side of the canal. The Baroque architecture of the church of Santa Maria della Salute is prominent. Arguably, Monet was more preoccupied with capturing the light on the water than the well known panoramas and sights of Venice. He certainly avoided painting the residents and tourists in the city; the absence of people gives an other-worldly impression.

Other works in the series included:

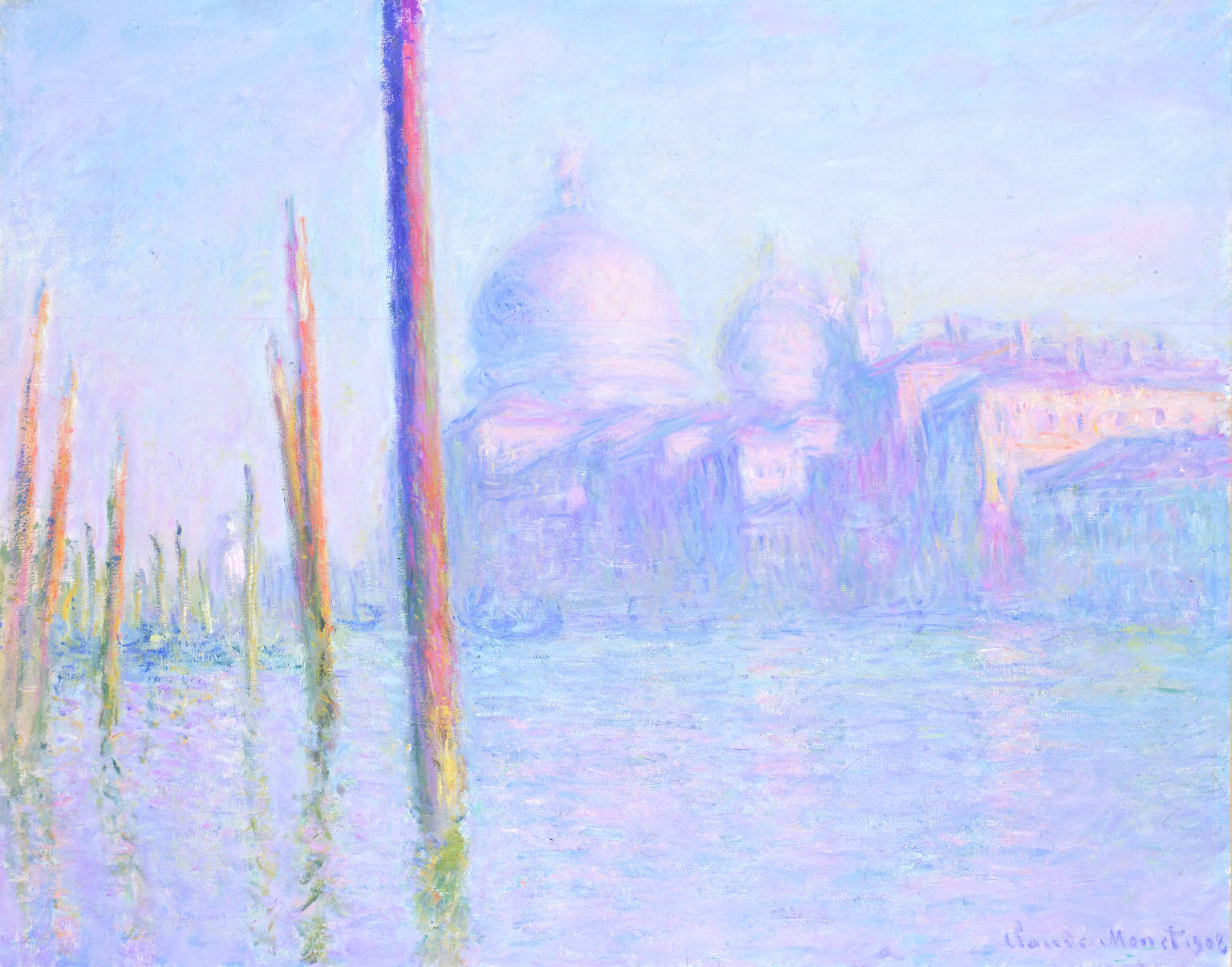
The Grand Canal - Fine Arts Museums of San Francisco (W 1736)

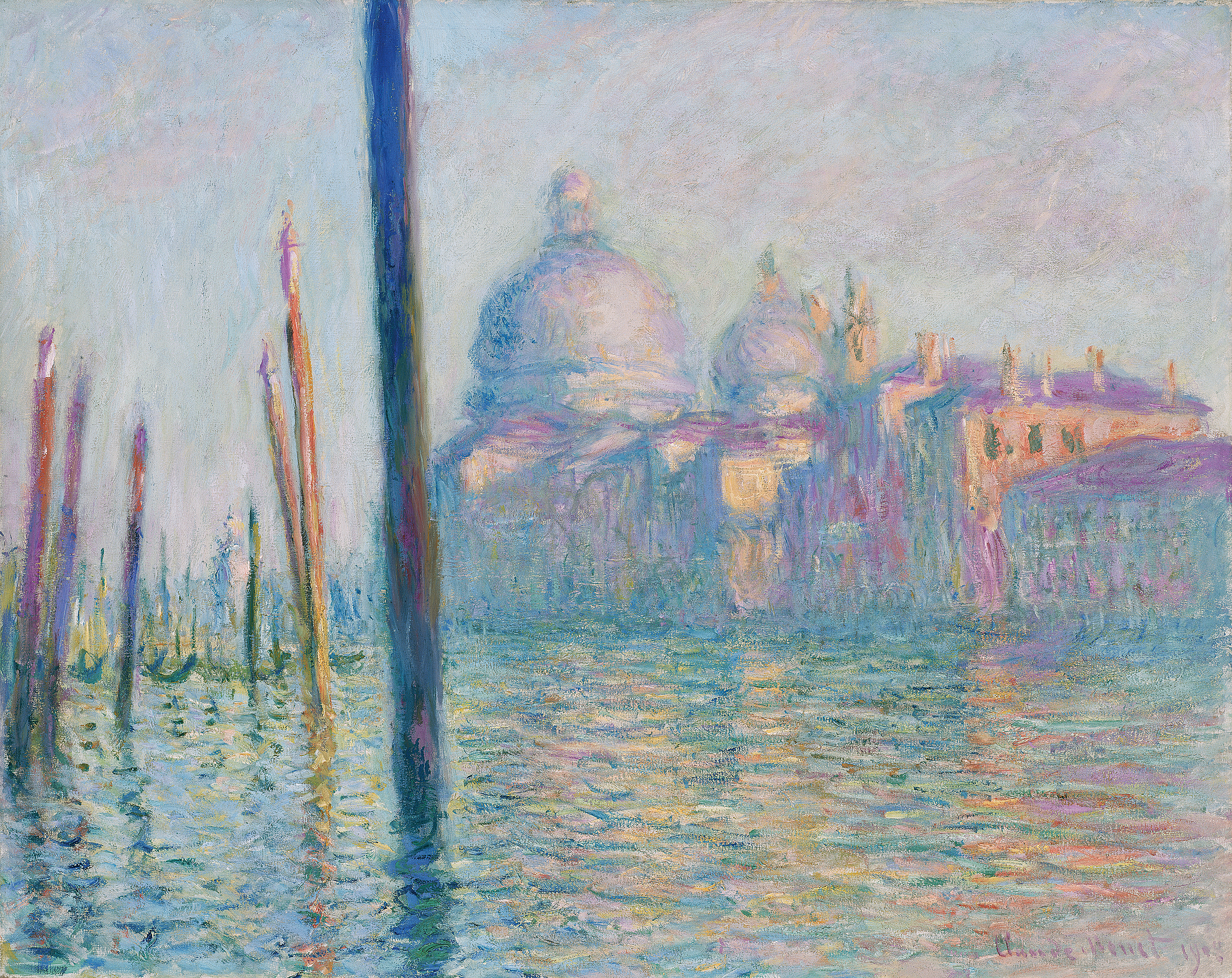
The Grand Canal - (W.1737)

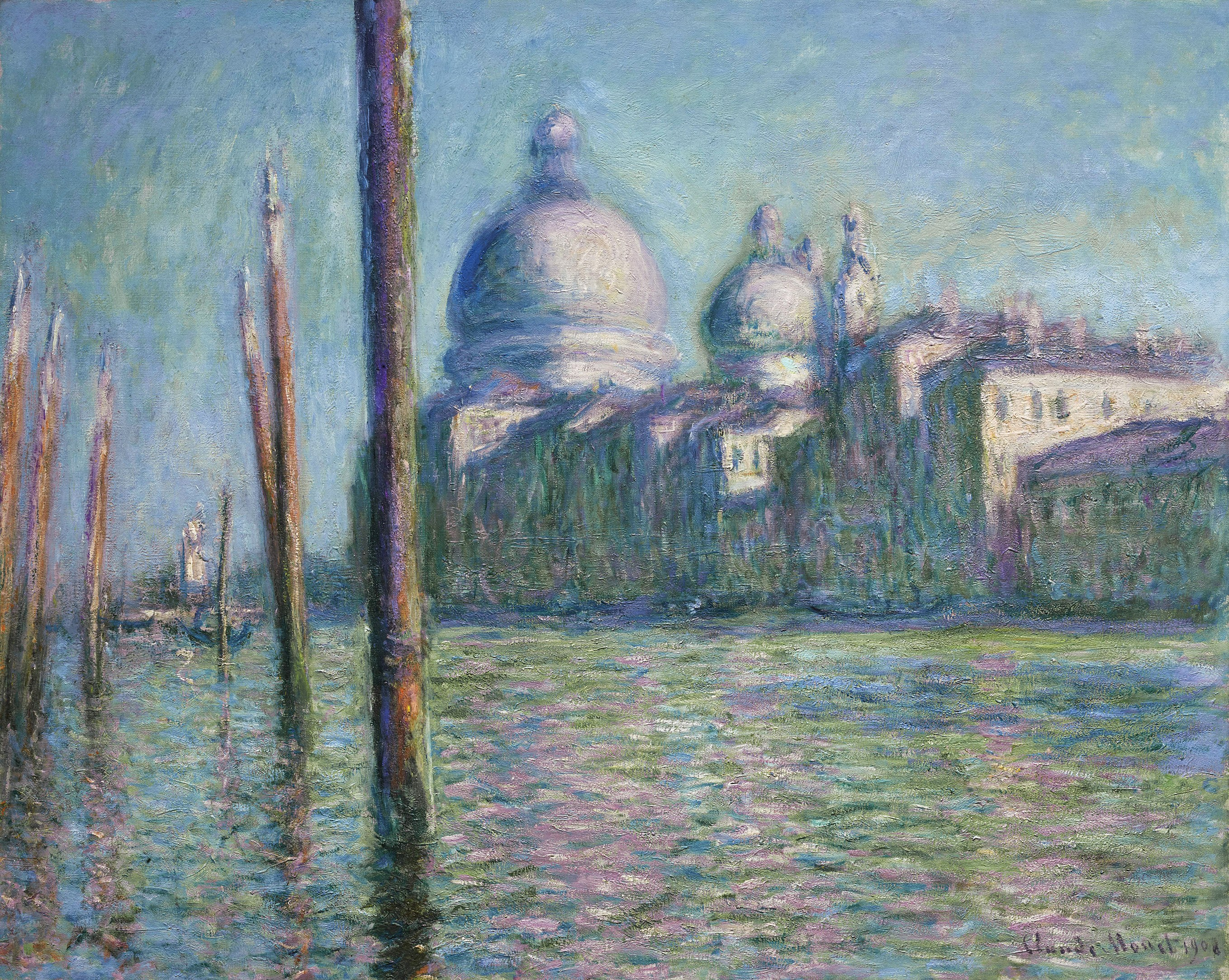
The Grand Canal - Nahmad Collection (W 1739)

== See also ==
- List of paintings by Claude Monet
