= Poplars (Monet series) =

1891 series of paintings by Claude Monet

- The Four Trees, Four Poplars on the Banks of the Epte River near Giverny
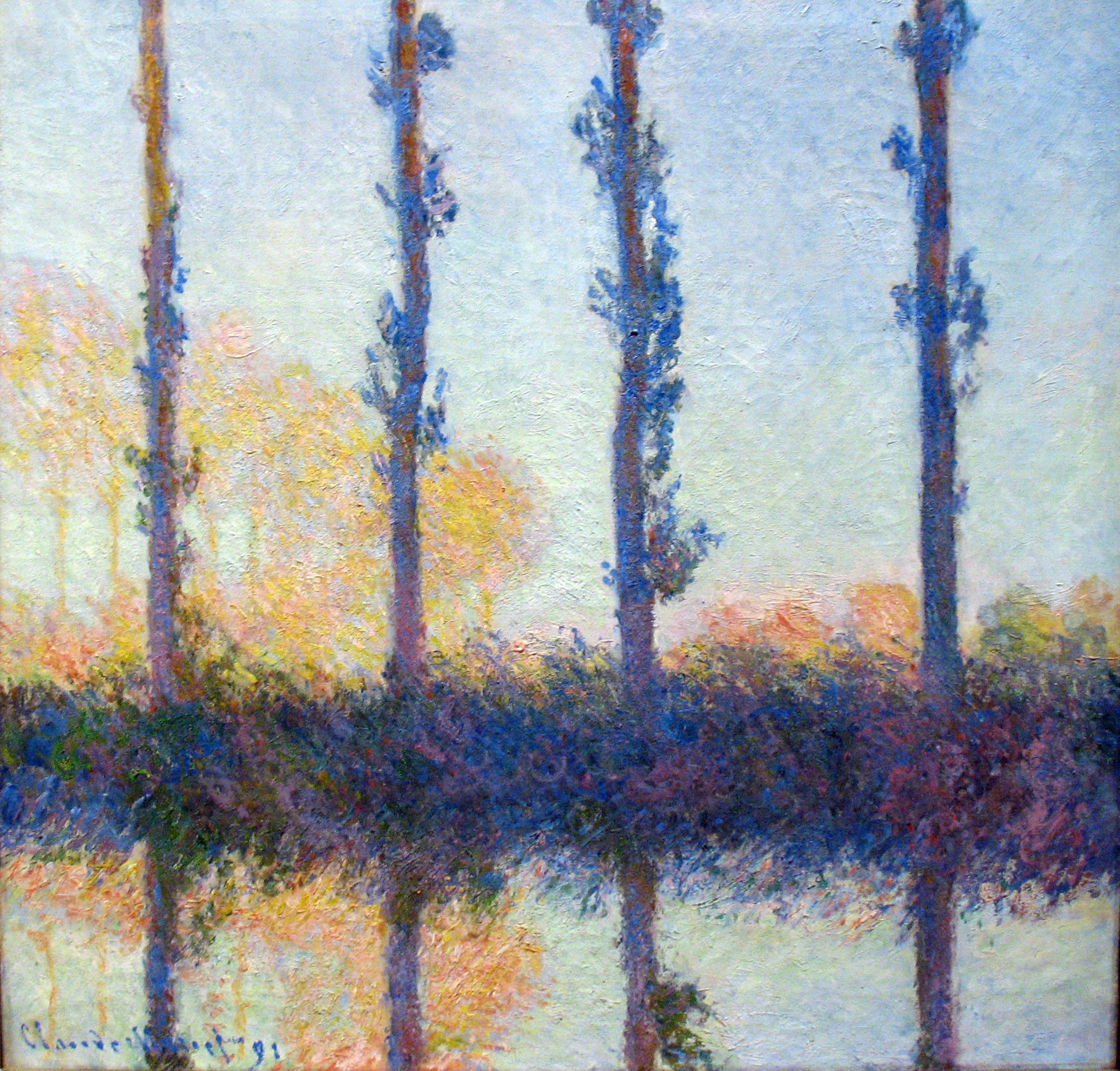
- Artist: Claude Monet
- Year: 1891
- Medium: oil on canvas
- Dimensions: 81.9 cm × 81.6 cm (32.2 in × 32.1 in)
- Location: Metropolitan Museum of Art, New York

The Poplars (French: Les Peupliers, pronounced [le pœplije]) series paintings were made by Claude Monet in the summer and fall of 1891. The trees were in a marsh along the banks of the Epte River a few kilometers upstream from Monet's home and studio. To reach his floating painting studio that was moored in place he went by small boat up the nearby waterway to where it joined the mainstream. The trees were along the riverside in single file, following along an S-curve. There were three groups of paintings — in one group the paintings have towering poplars that go off the top edge of the canvas, in another group, there are seven trees and in another group three or four poplars on the banks of the Epte River near Giverny. The trees, which actually belonged to the commune of Limetz-Villez, were put up for auction before Monet had completed all of his paintings. At a certain point, Monet was forced into buying the trees because he still wasn't finished with his paintings. After he finished the series he sold the trees back to the lumber merchant who also wanted them.

== Gallery ==
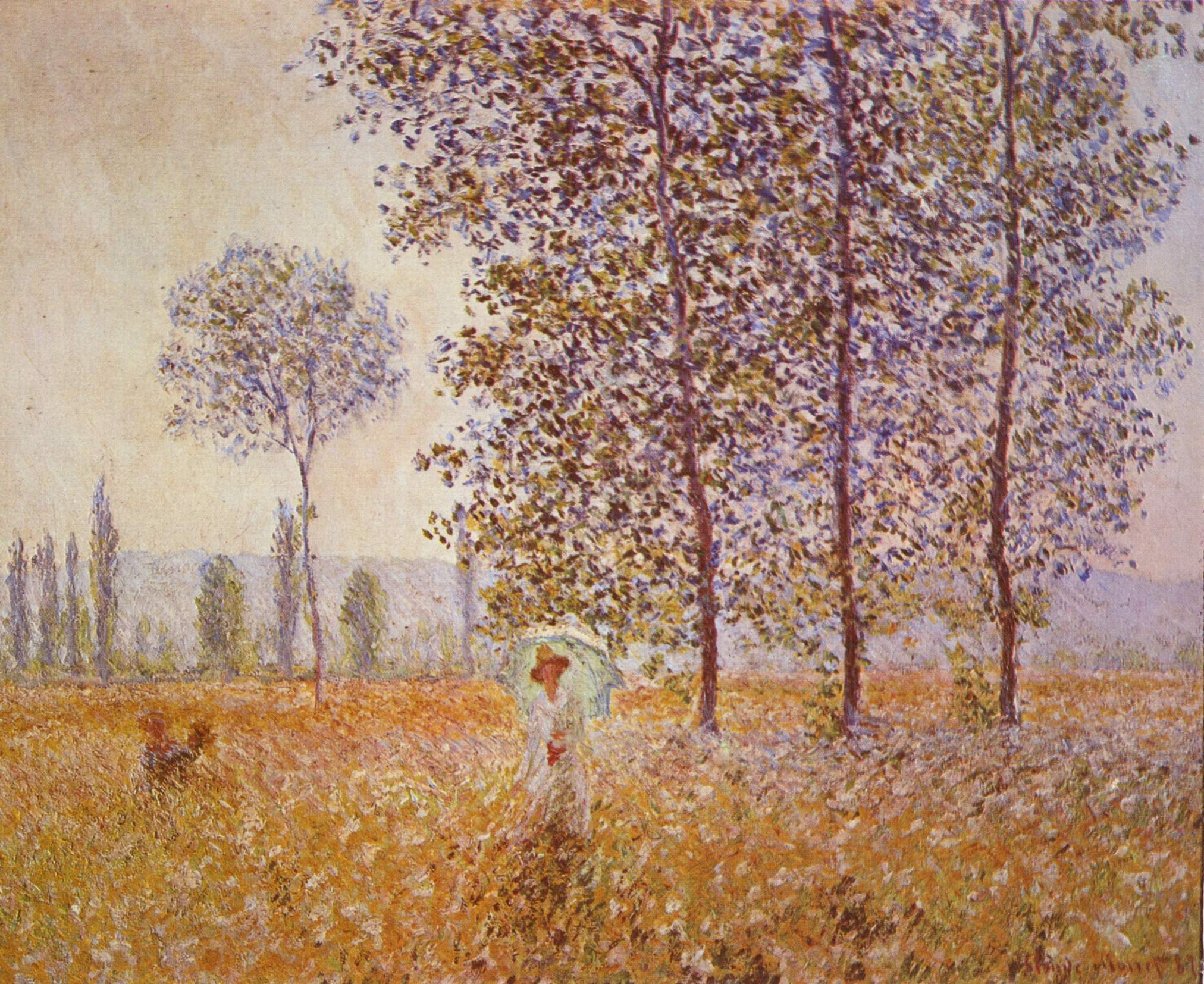
Poplars in the Sun, 1887, Staatsgalerie Stuttgart.

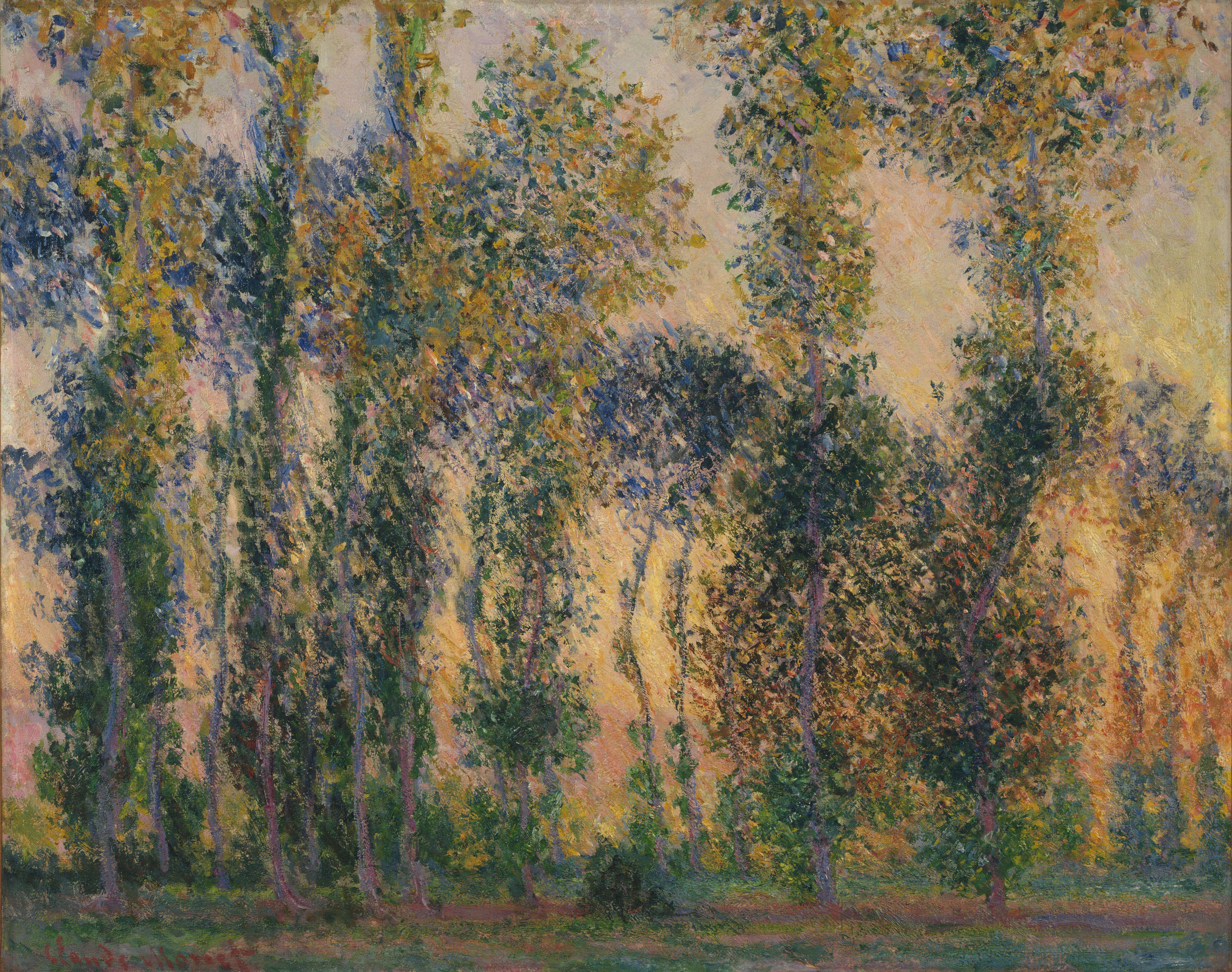
Poplars at Giverny, Sunrise, 1888, Museum of Modern Art

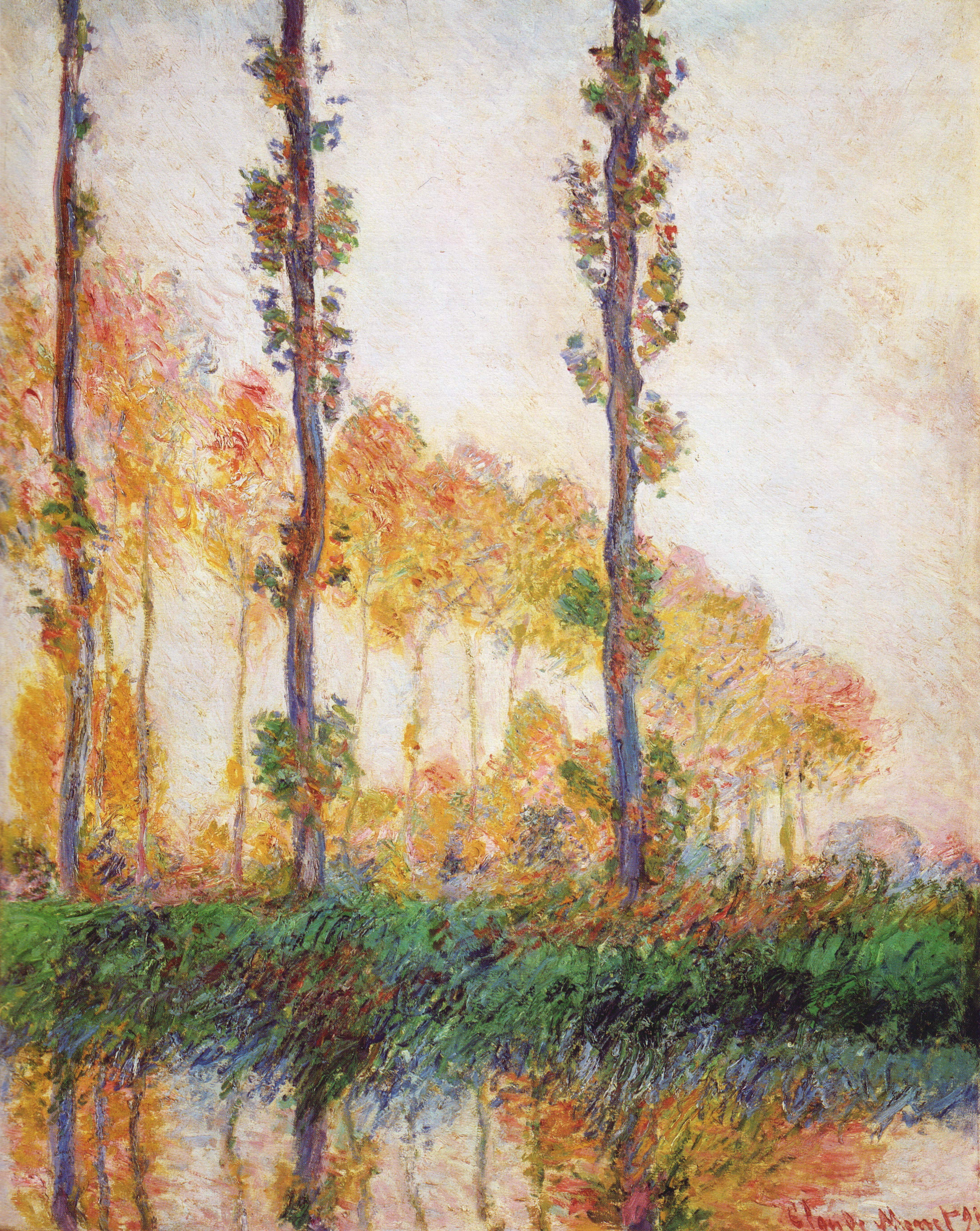
Poplars (Autumn), 1891

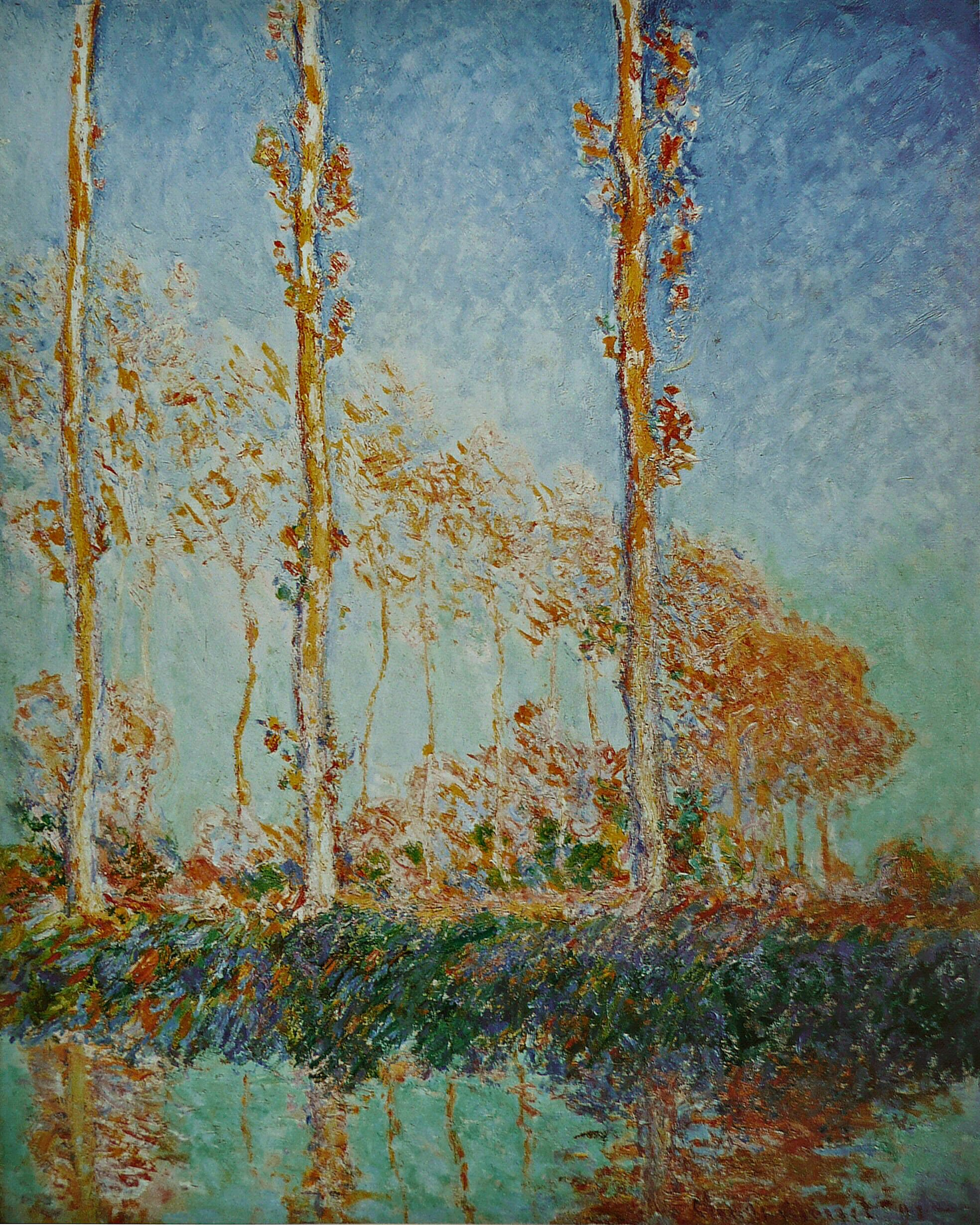
Poplars (Autumn), 1891, Philadelphia Museum of Art

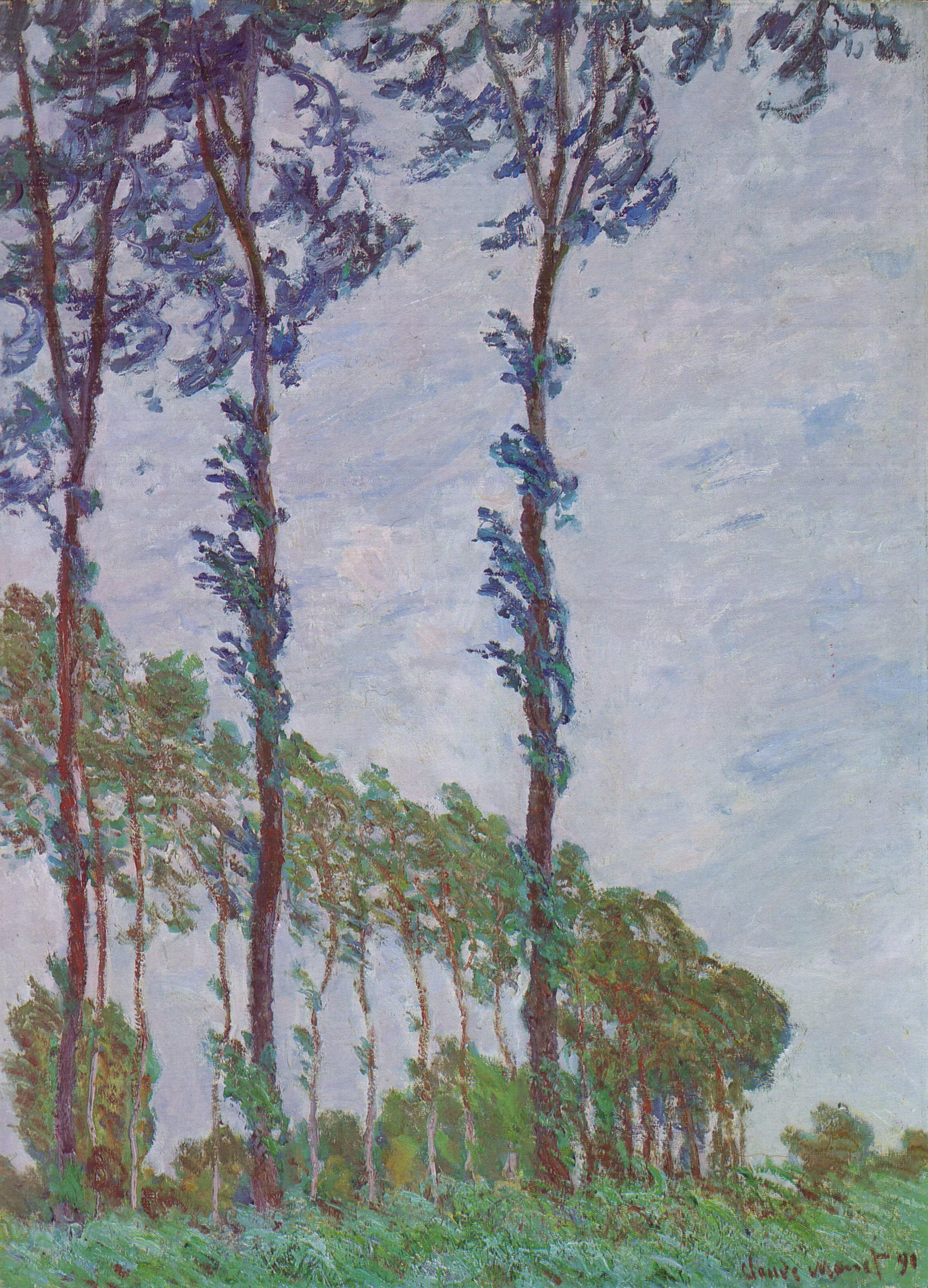
Poplars (Wind effect), 1891

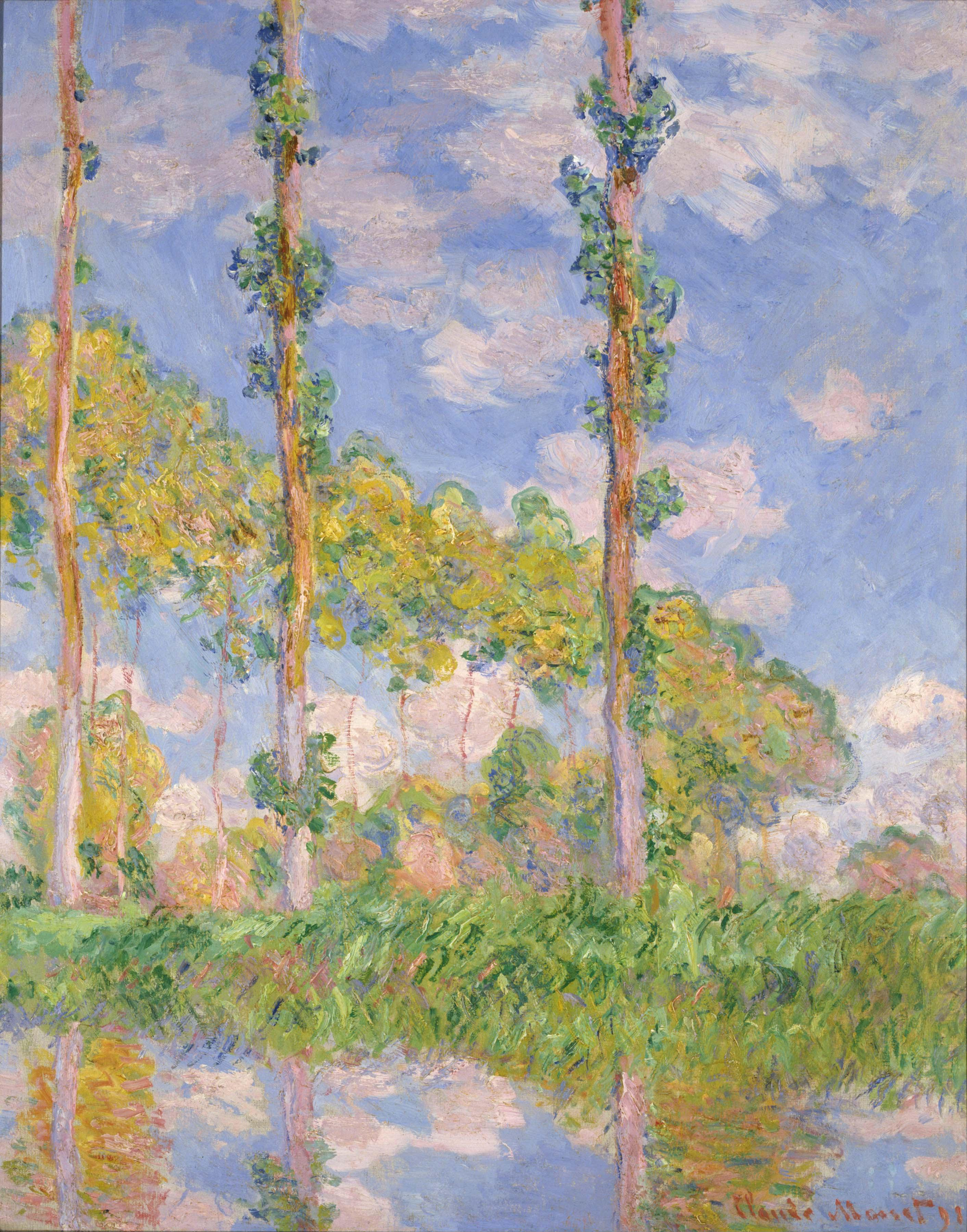
Poplars in the Sun, 1891, The National Museum of Western Art, Tokyo

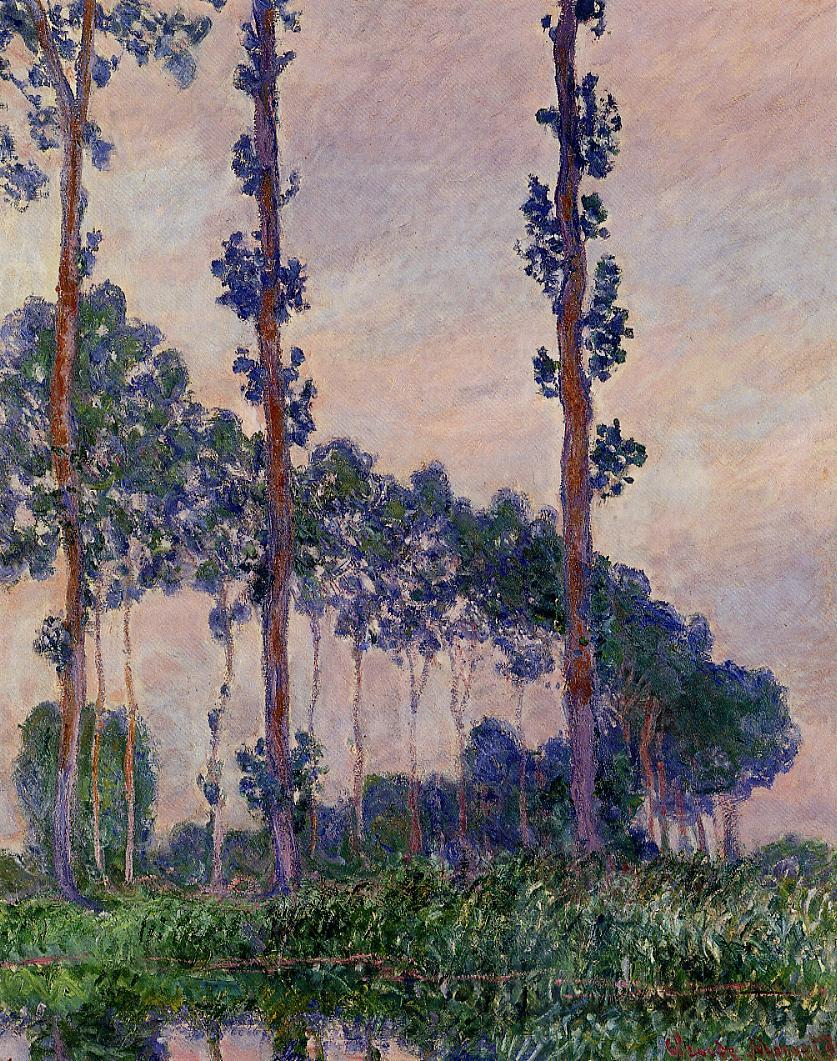
Three Trees in Grey Weather, 1891

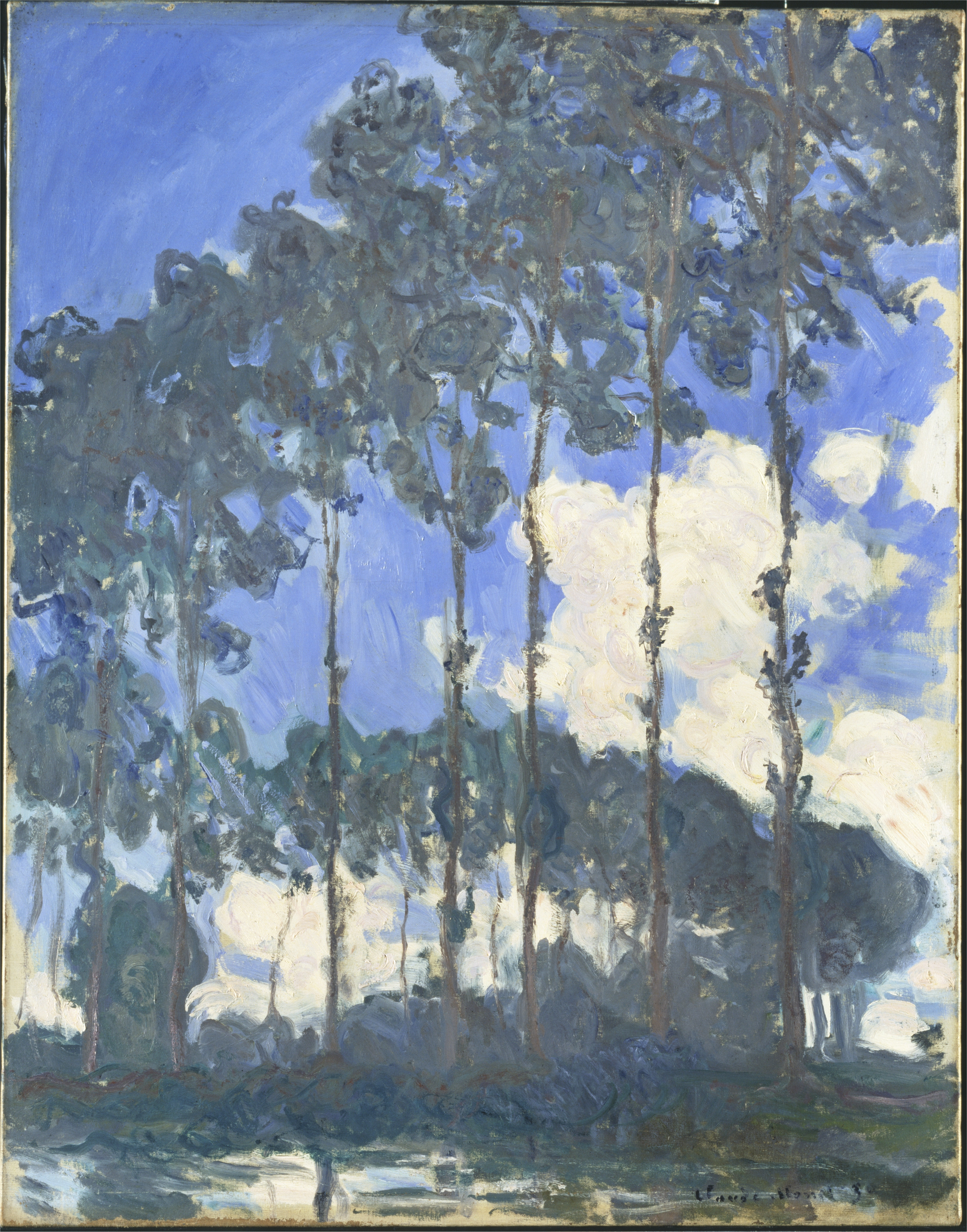
Poplars at the River Epte, 1891 Tate

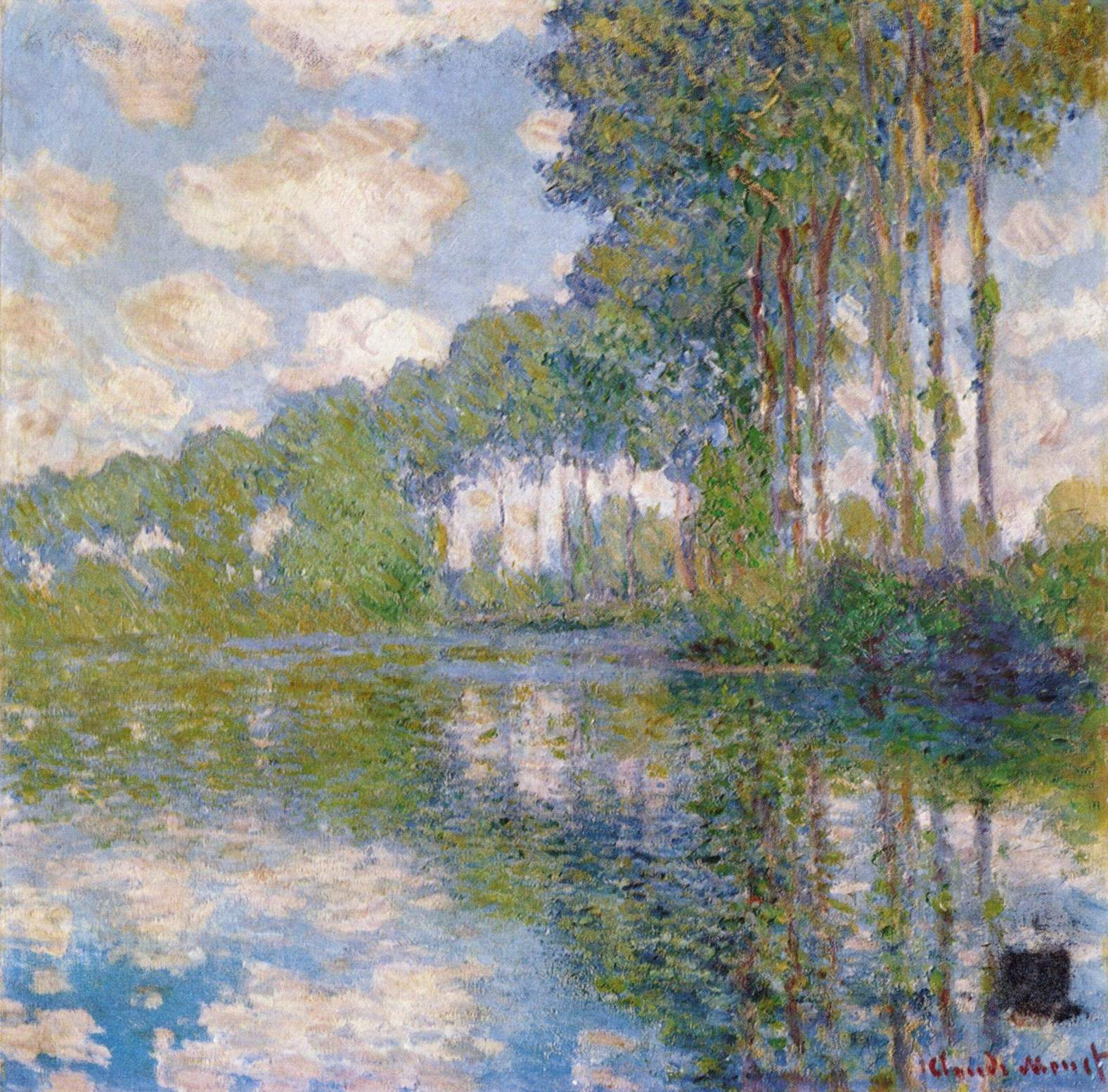
Poplars on the Epte, 1900, National Gallery of Scotland, Edinburgh

== Public display ==
In 2015, the National Gallery in London exhibited five paintings from the series, together in a single room, for the duration of an exhibition devoted to Paul Durand-Ruel. This was a rare occurrence and believed to possibly be the first time that these five paintings have been exhibited together since they were painted.

The paintings were also shown at The Philadelphia Museum of Art when the exhibition traveled from London to Philadelphia.

== See also ==
- List of paintings by Claude Monet
