= Rouen Cathedral (Monet series) =

1892–1894 series of paintings by Claude Monet

Rouen Cathedral, Full Sunlight
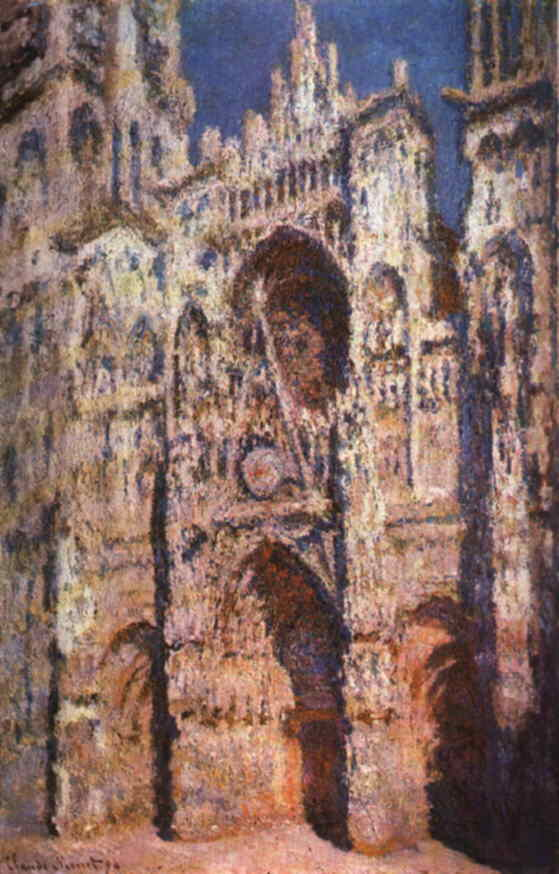
- Artist: Claude Monet
- Year: 1894
- Medium: Oil on canvas
- Dimensions: 107 cm × 73.5 cm (42 in × 28.9 in)
- Location: Musée d'Orsay, Paris

The Rouen Cathedral series was painted in the 1890s by the French Impressionist painter Claude Monet. The paintings in the series each capture the façade of Rouen Cathedral at different times of the day and year and reflect changes in its appearance under different lighting conditions.

== Date ==
The Rouen Cathedral paintings, more than thirty in all, were made in 1892 and 1893 in Rouen, Normandy, then reworked in Monet’s studio in 1894. Monet rented spaces in Rouen across the street from the cathedral as his temporary studio. In 1895 he selected what he considered to be the twenty best paintings from the series for display at his Paris dealer's gallery and sold eight of them before the exhibition was over. Camille Pissarro and Paul Cézanne visited the exhibition and praised the series highly.

Historically, the series was well-timed. In the early 1890s, France was seeing a revival of interest in Catholicism and the subject of one of its major cathedrals was well received. Apart from its religious significance, Rouen Cathedral—built in the Gothic style—could be seen as representing all that was best in French history and culture, given that it was a style of architecture that was admired and adopted by many European countries during the Middle Ages.

== Painting light ==
When Monet painted the Rouen Cathedral series, he had long since been impressed with the way light imparts to a subject a distinctly different character at different times of the day and the year and as atmospheric conditions change. For Monet, the effects of light on a subject became as important as the subject itself. Like his other series (such as the famous Water Lilies) in which Monet painted many views of the same subject under different lighting conditions, these works are an attempt to illustrate the importance of light in our perception of a subject at a given time and place. He spent much of his career in attempts to capture these nuances, as exemplified by his frequent saying, "Nature never stands still."

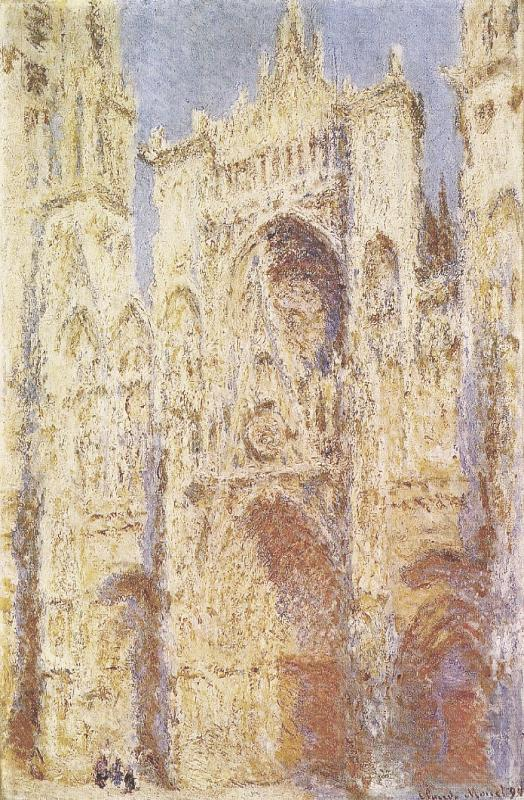
Rouen Cathedral, West Façade, Sunlight
1894
National Gallery of Art
Washington, D.C., USA

Rouen Cathedral, red, Sunlight
1892
National Museum of Serbia
Belgrade, Serbia

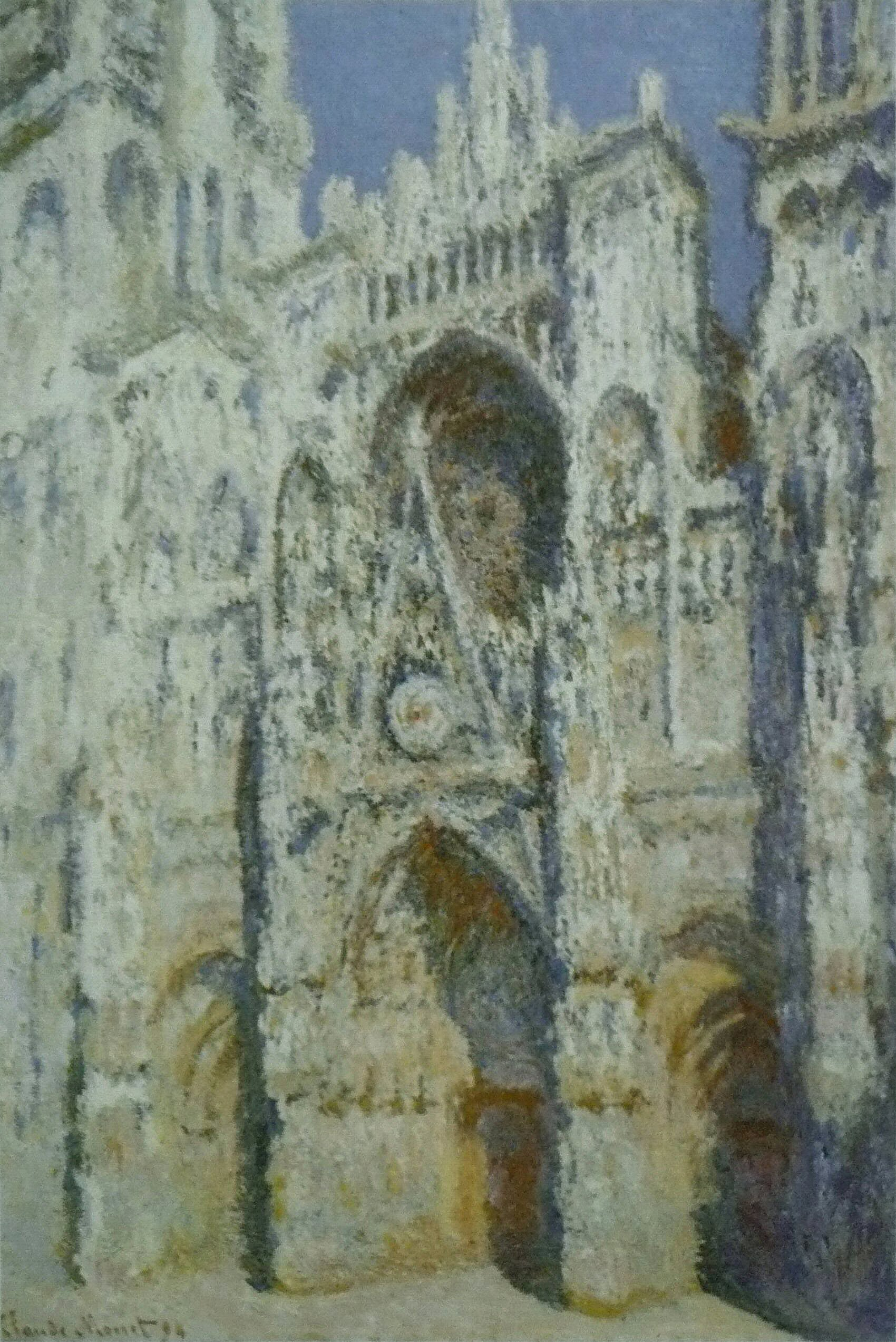
La Cathédrale de Rouen. Le portail et la tour Saint-Romain, plein soleil; harmonie bleue et or
1892–1893
Musée d'Orsay
Paris, France

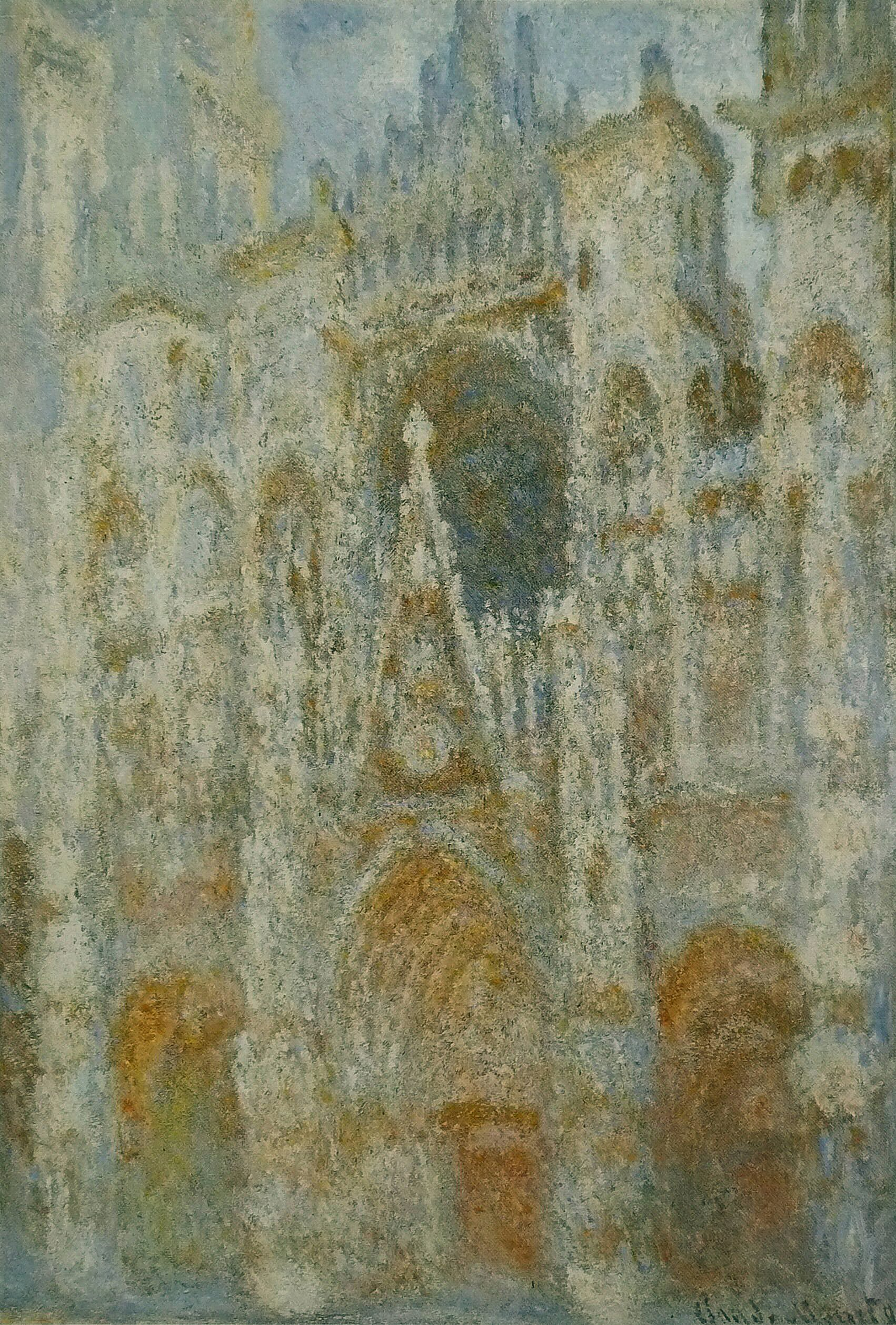
La Cathédrale de Rouen. Le portail, soleil matinal; harmonie bleue
1892–1893
Musée d'Orsay
Paris, France

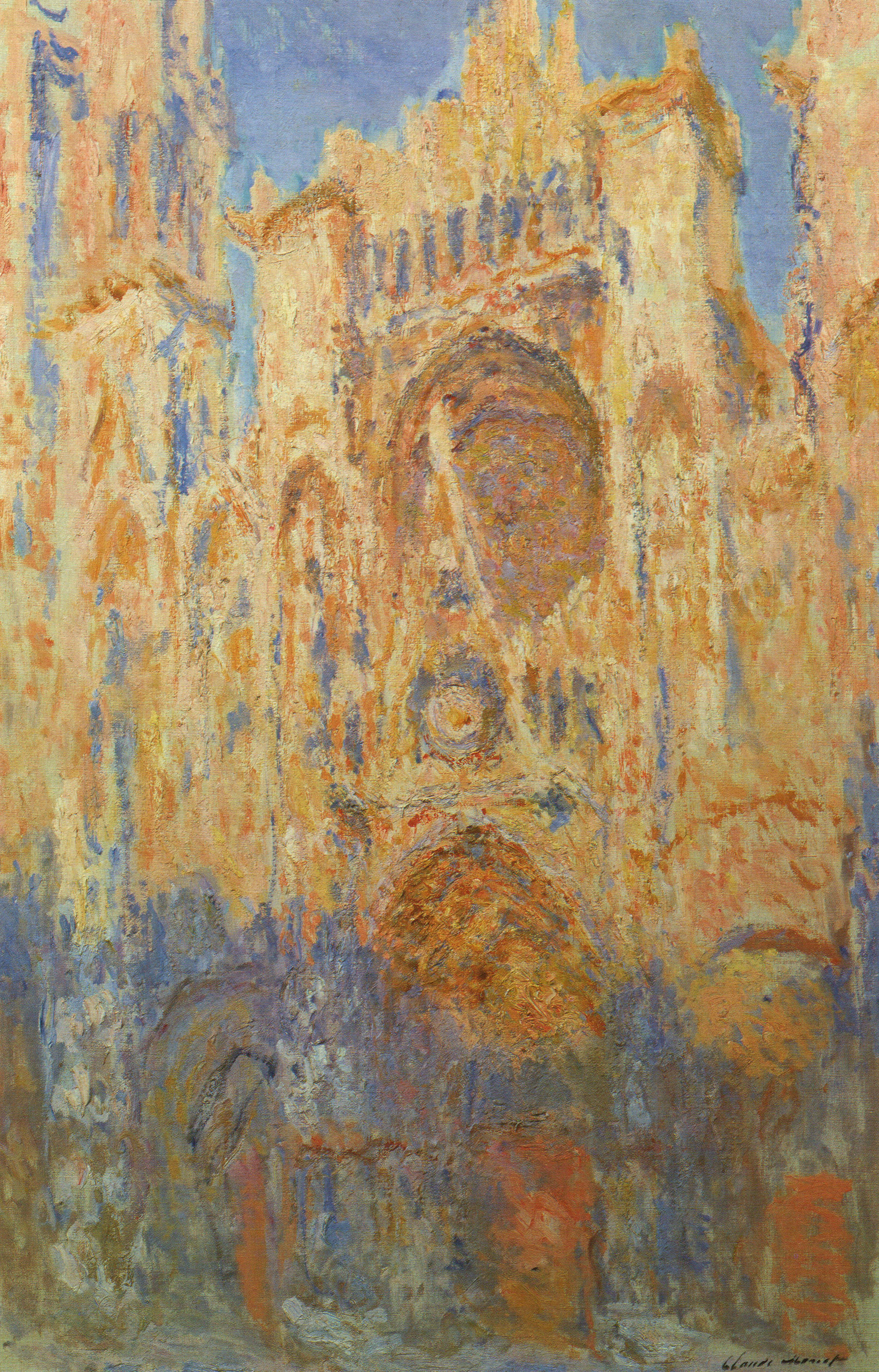
Rouen Cathedral, Facade (sunset), harmonie in gold and blue
1892–1894
Musée Marmottan Monet
Paris, France

Robert Pelfrey, in Art and Mass Media, wrote: "By focusing on the same subject through a whole series of paintings, Monet was able to concentrate on recording visual sensations themselves. The subjects did not change, but the visual sensations – due to changing conditions of light – changed constantly."

The cathedral series was not Monet's first series of paintings of a single subject, but it was his most exhaustive. The subject matter was a change, however, for prior to this series, Monet had painted mostly landscapes. The cathedral allowed him to highlight the paradox between a seemingly permanent, solid structure and the ever-changing light which constantly plays with our perception of it. There were calls for the state to buy the entire series and exhibit them as a whole, but these calls were not heeded and the series was divided.

== Technique ==
Painting the cathedral was a challenging task, even for Monet. Michael Howard, in his Encyclopedia of Impressionism, writes:

As always, the pictures gave him intense difficulties, which threw him into despair. He had vivid nightmares of the cathedral in various colors – pink, blue and yellow – falling upon him… [Monet wrote:] ‘Things don’t advance very steadily, primarily because each day I discover something I hadn’t seen the day before… In the end, I am trying to do the impossible.’

Monet found that the thing he had set out to paint—light—was an almost impossible thing to capture because of its ever-changing nature and its extreme subtlety. He was assisted, however, by his ability to capture the essence of a scene quickly, then finish it later using a sketch combined with his memory of the scene. For these paintings, he used thick layers of richly textured paint, expressive of the intricate nature of the subject. Paul Hayes Tucker, in Claude Monet: Life and Art, writes:

Monet’s sensitivity to the natural effects he observed are just one factor that make these pictures so remarkable; the way he manipulates his medium contributes to their majesty as well. For the surfaces of these canvases are literally encrusted with paint that Monet built up layer upon layer like the masonry of the façade itself.

Through layered paint application and color juxtaposition, the series captures the changing atmospheric and lighting conditions on the building.

== Gallery ==
The Portal of Rouen Cathedral in Morning Light, 1894, J. Paul Getty Museum.

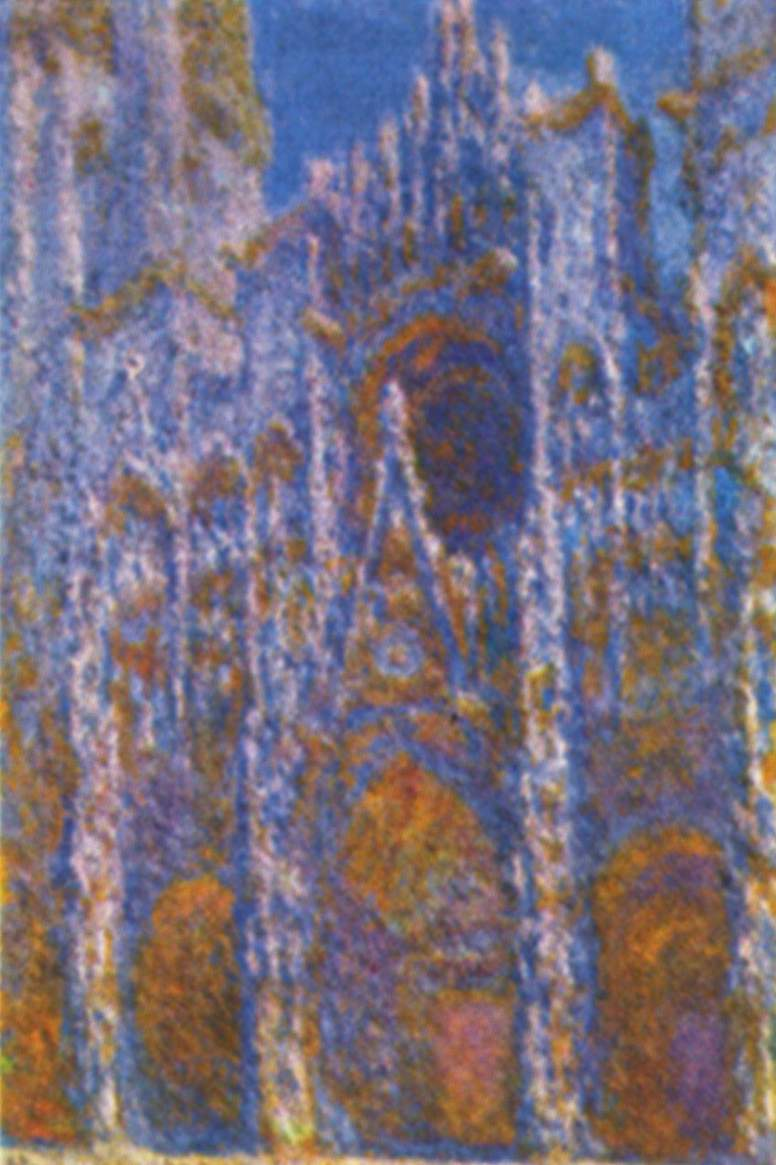
The portal and the tower of the saint-romain at morning sun, Harmony in Blue
1893
Musée d'Orsay
Paris, France

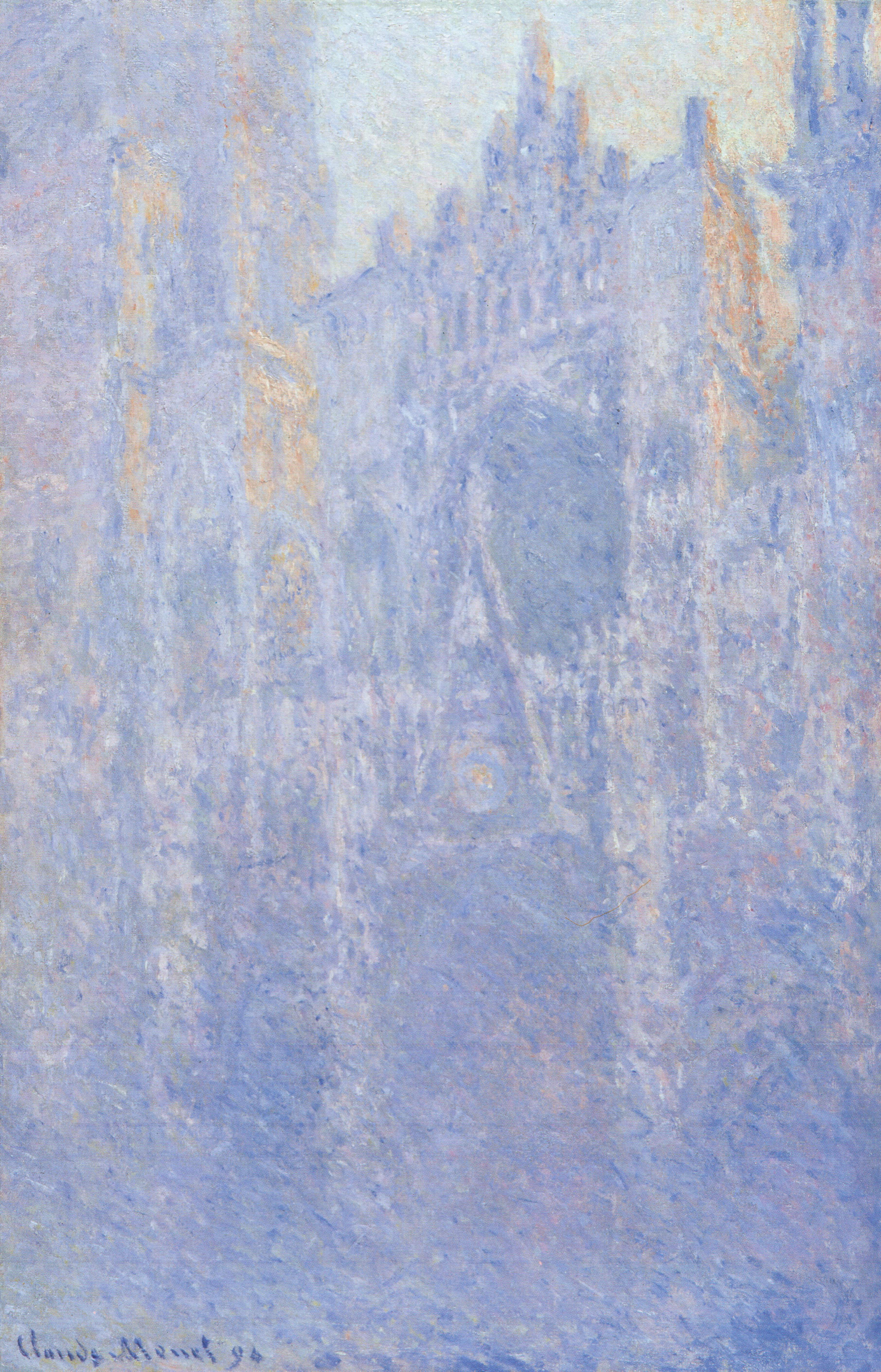
Rouen Cathedral, Facade (Morning effect)
1892–1894
Folkwang Museum
Essen, Germany

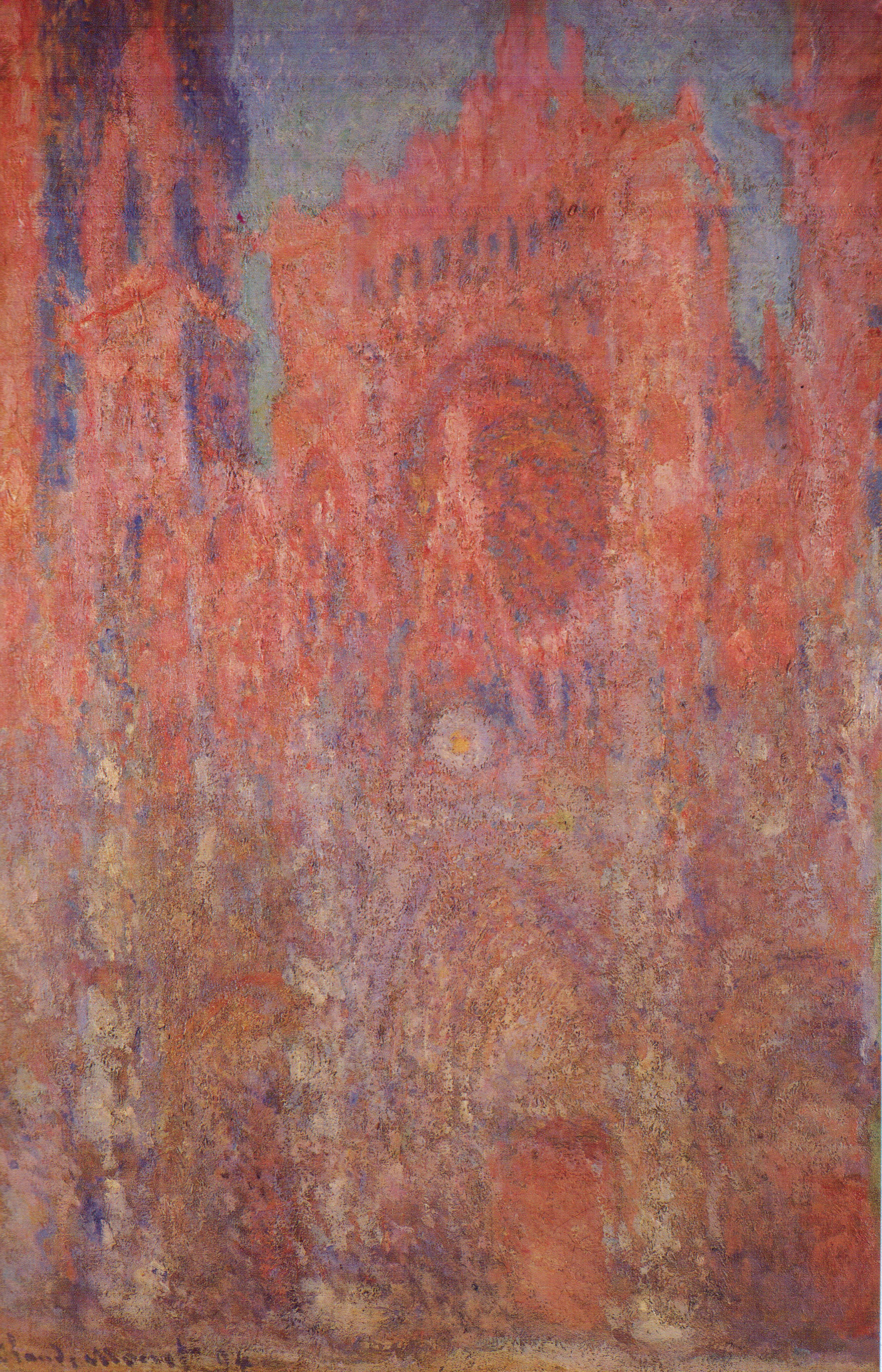
Rouen Cathedral, Facade 1
1892–1894
Pola Museum of Art
Hakone, Japan

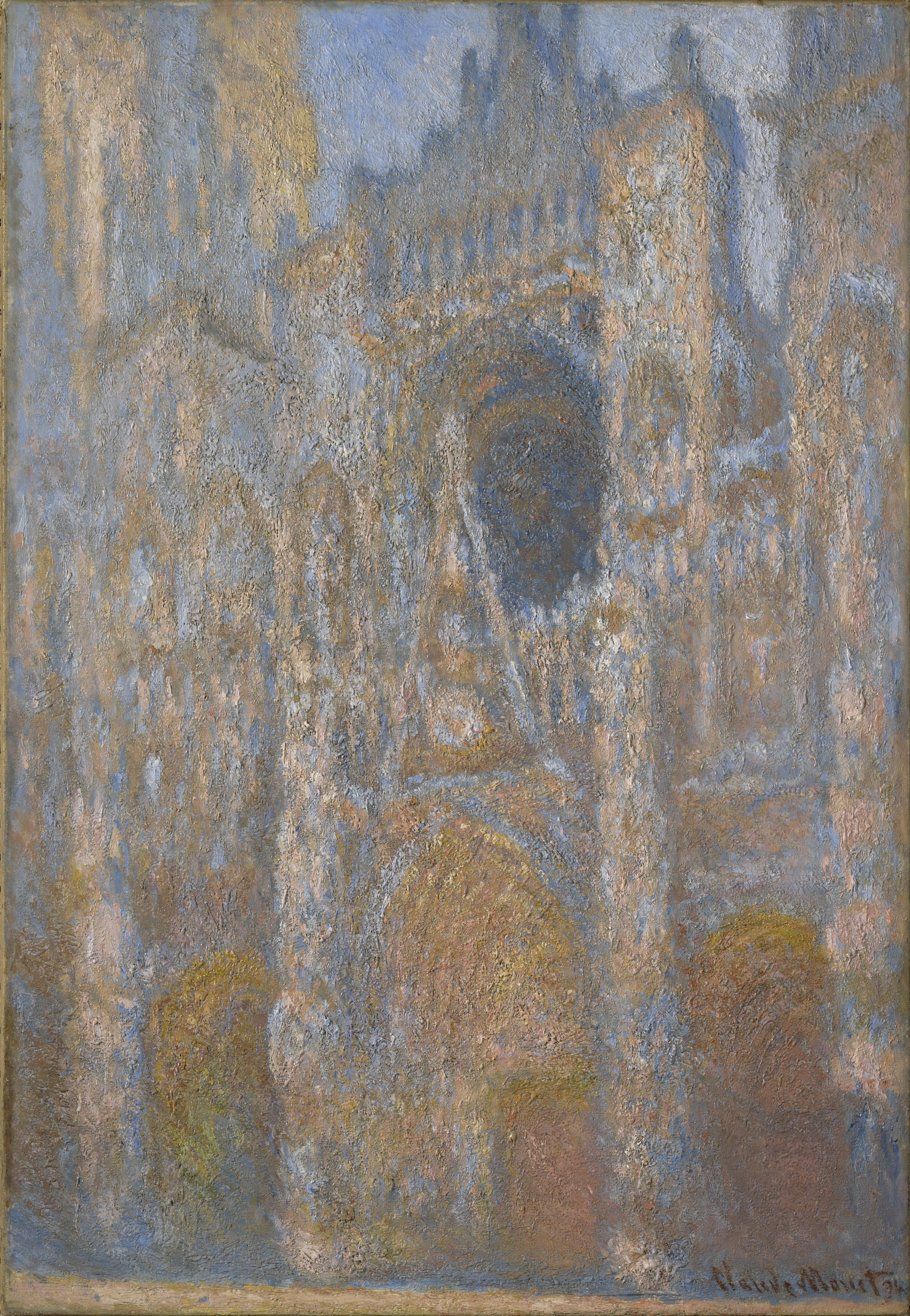
Rouen Cathedral, The Façade in Sunlight
1894
Clark Art Institute
Williamstown, USA

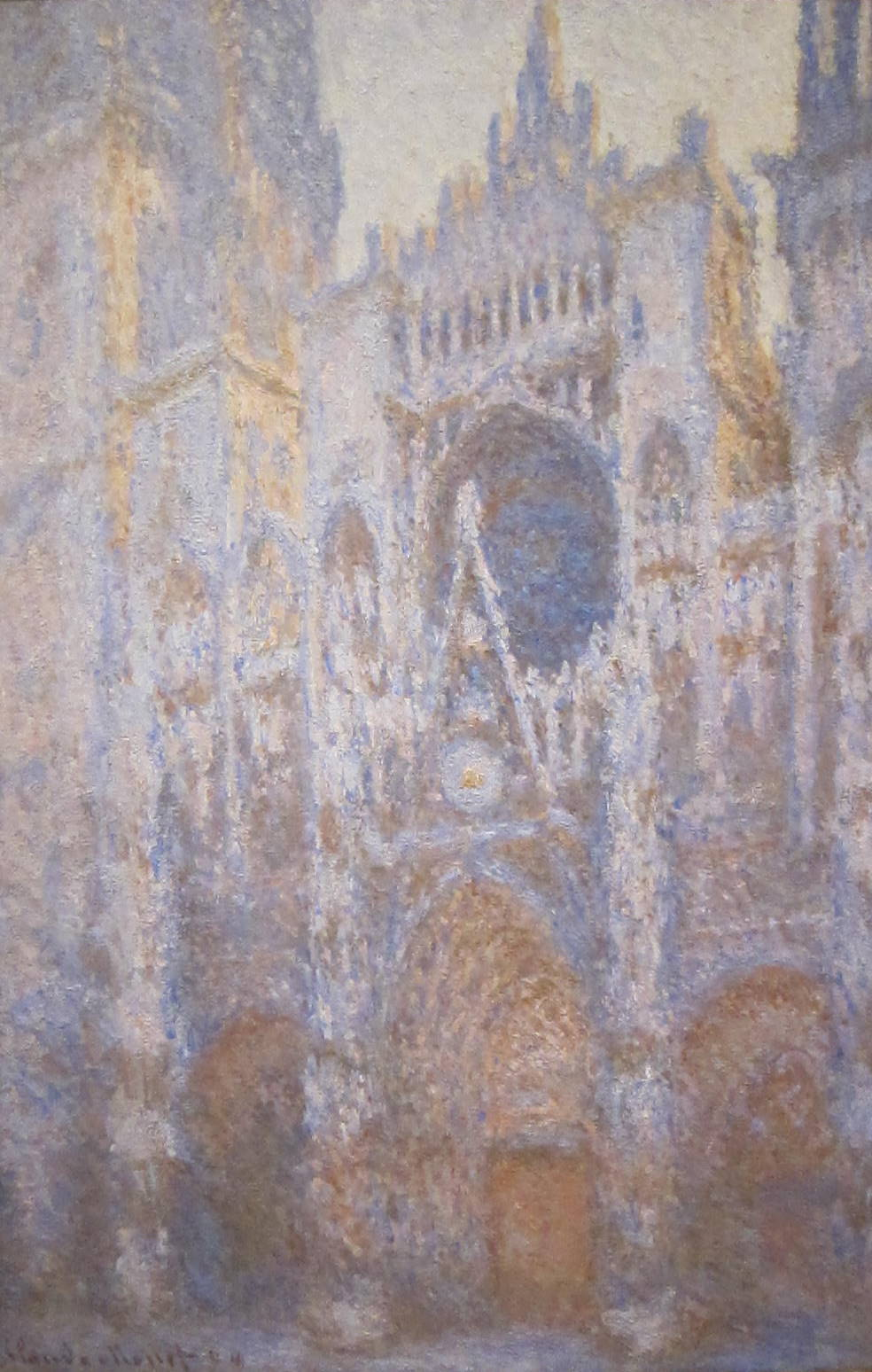
Rouen Cathedral, West Facade, 1894, National Gallery of Art

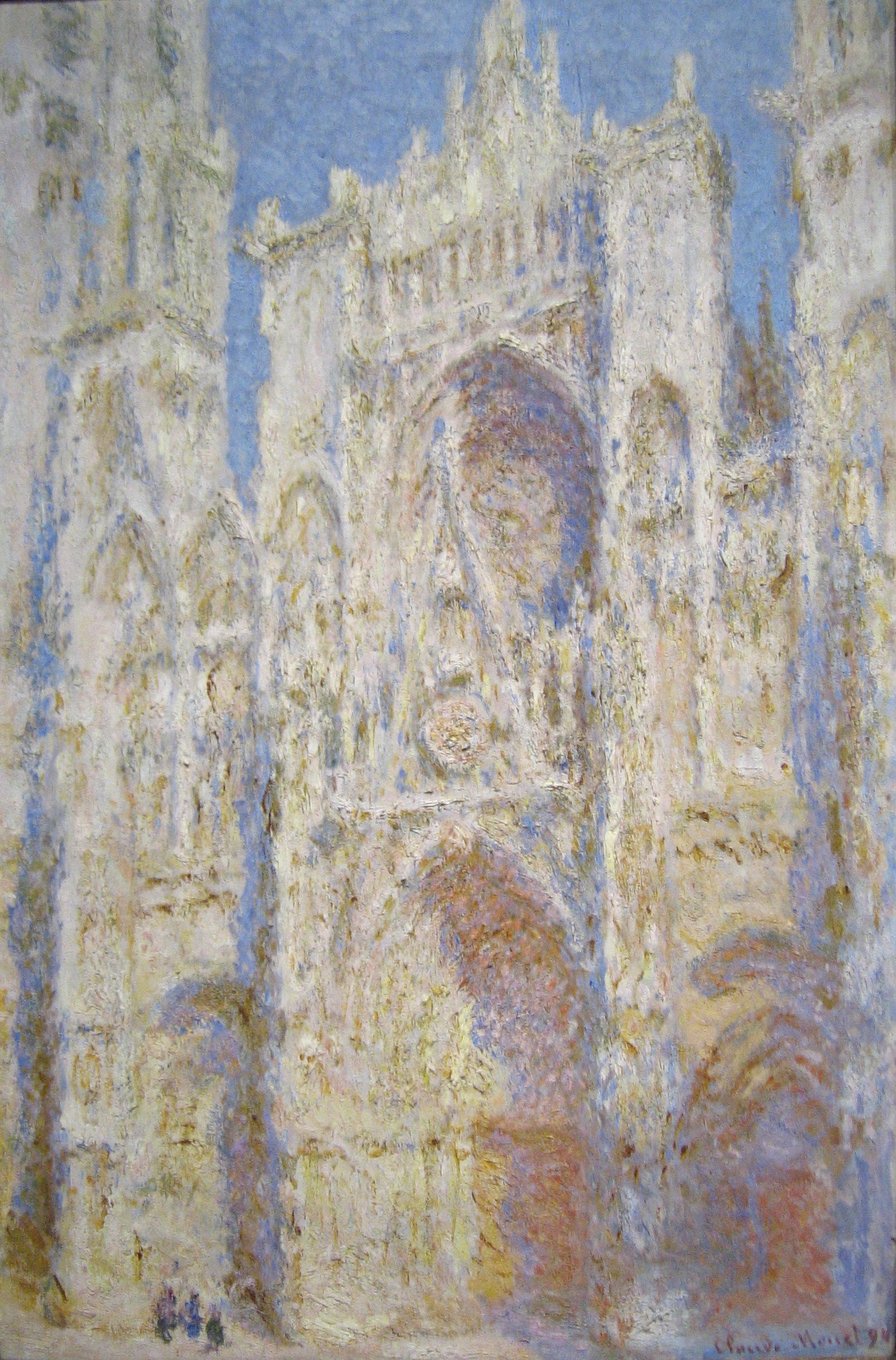
Rouen Cathedral, West Facade, Sunlight, 1894, National Gallery of Art

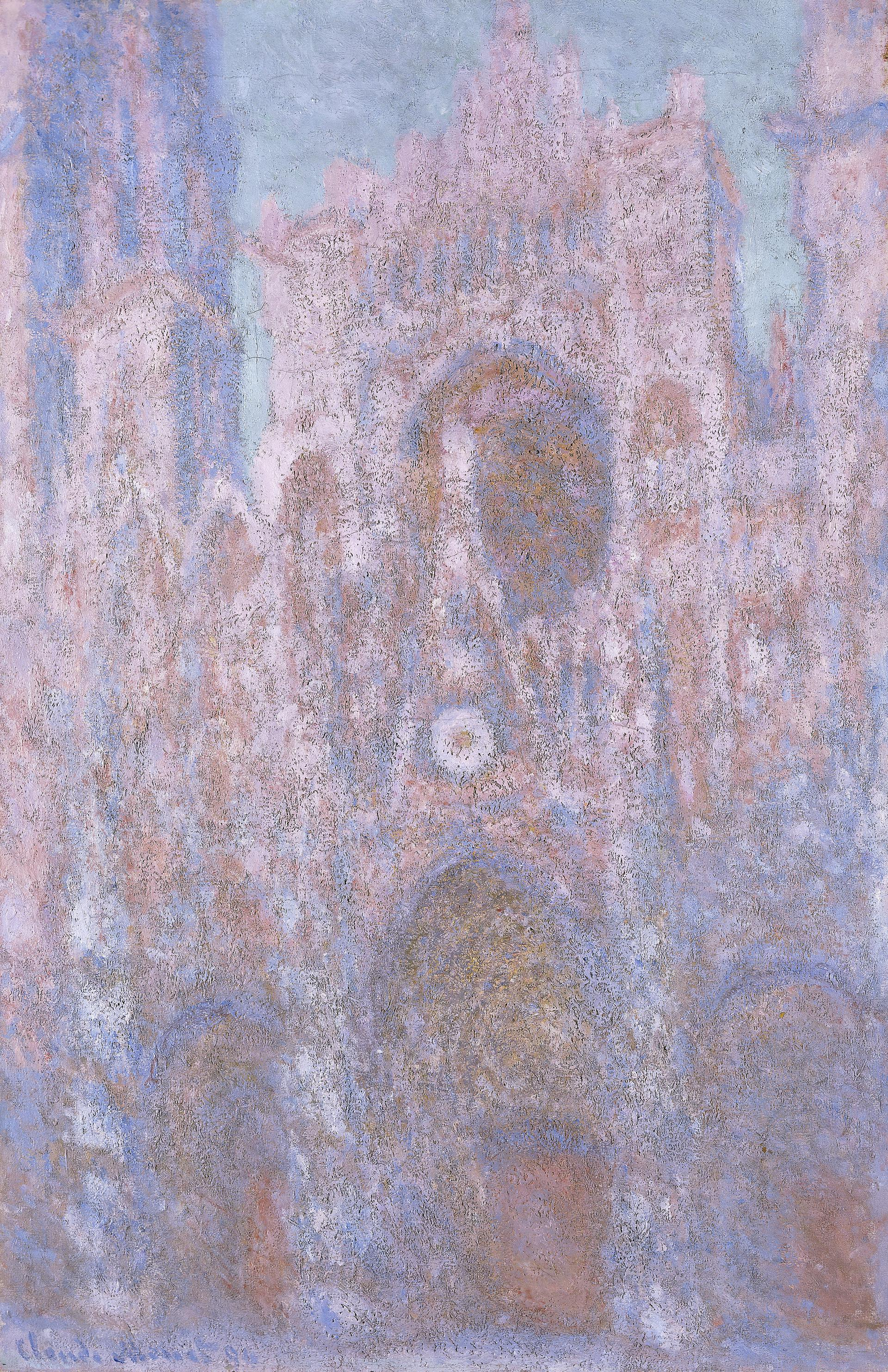
Rouen Cathedral- Setting Sun, (Symphony in Grey and Pink), 1894, National Museum Cardiff, Great Britain

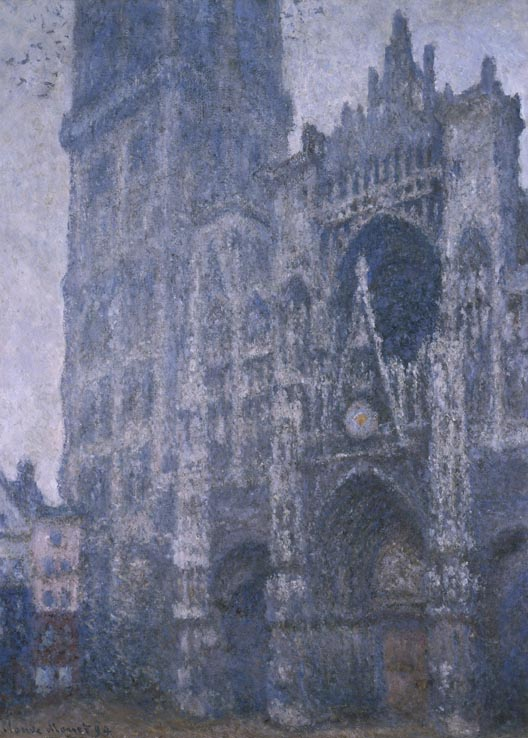
Rouen Cathedral, Facade and the Tour d'Albane. Grey Weather, 1894, Musée des Beaux-Arts de Rouen

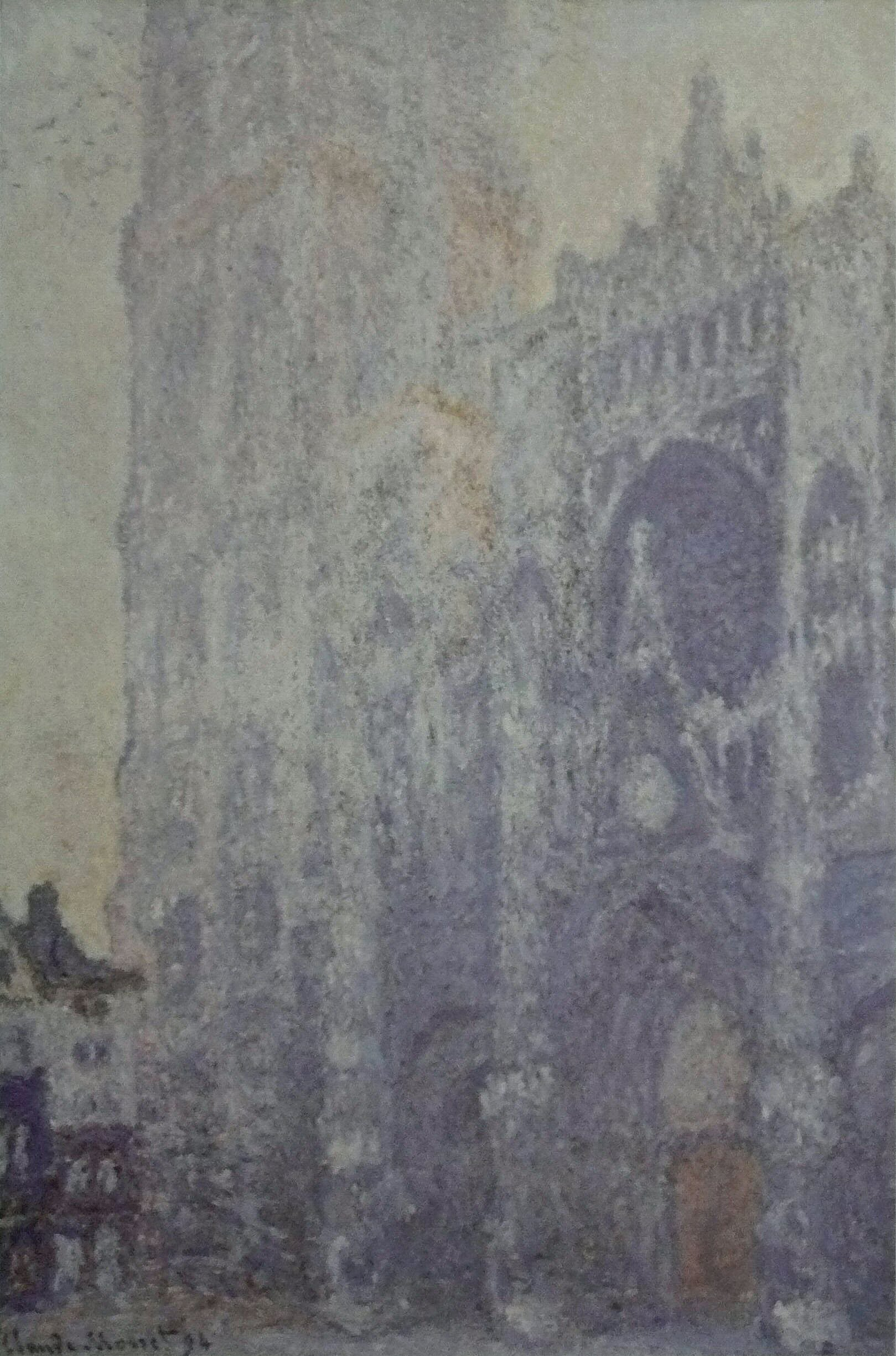
La Cathédrale de Rouen. Le portail et la tour Saint-Romain, effet du matin; harmonie blanche
1892–1893
Musée d'Orsay
Paris, France

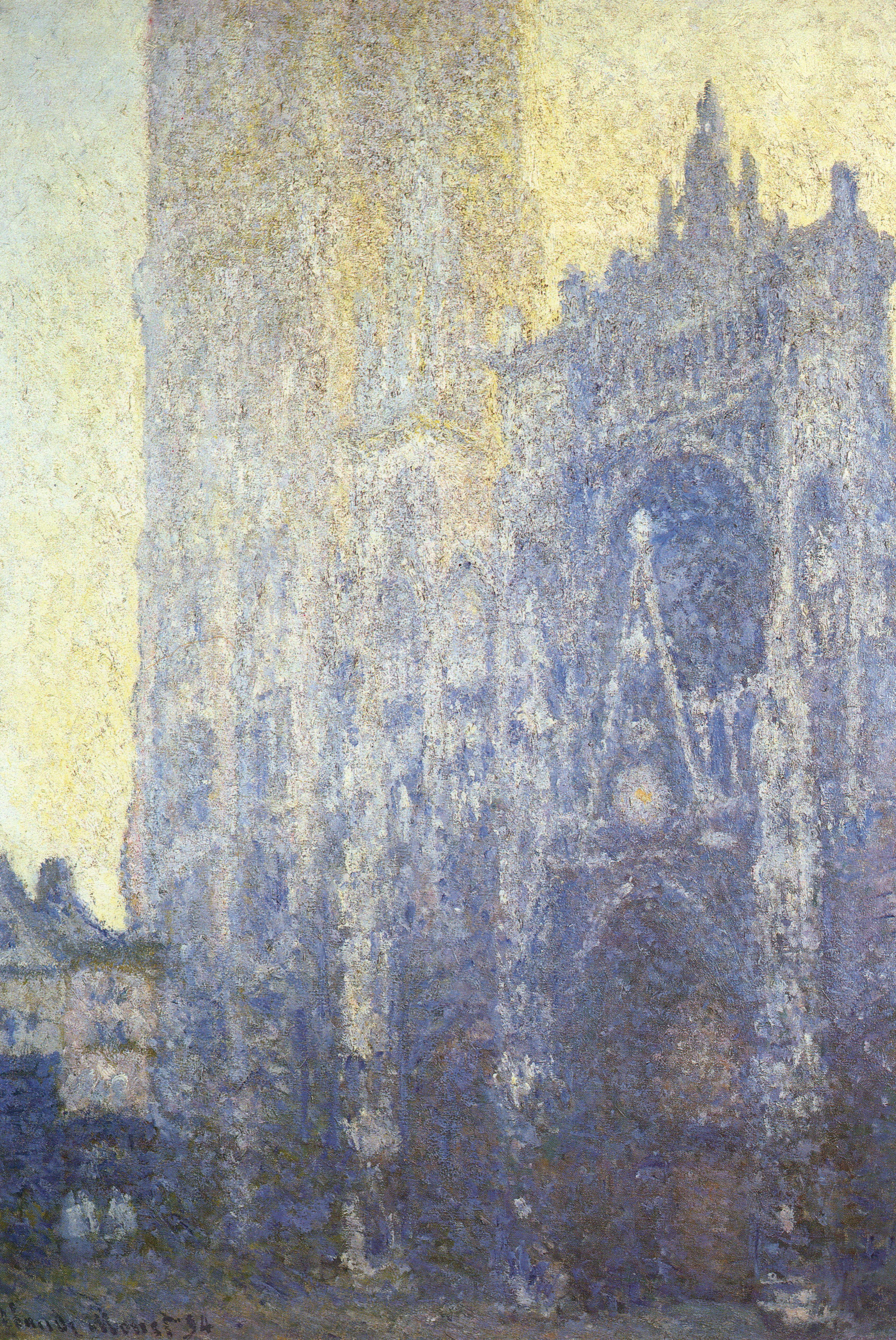
Rouen Cathedral, Facade and Tour d'AlbaneI, dull day
1892–1894
Beyeler Museum
Riehen, Switzerland

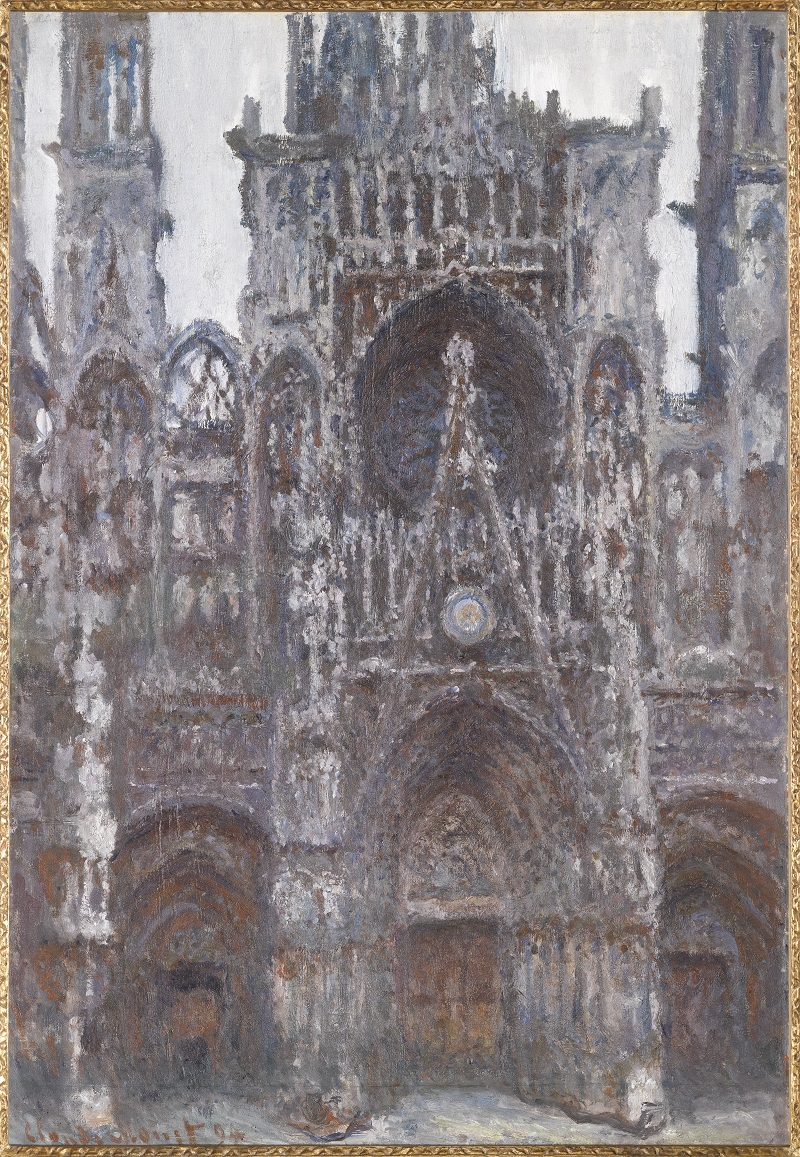
Rouen Cathedral, the West Portal, Dull Weather
1892
Musée d'Orsay
Paris, France

== Public display ==
In 1994, the Musée des Beaux-Arts de Rouen exhibited sixteen paintings of the series.

The Musée d'Orsay has five paintings of the series on permanent display.

In 2018, the National Gallery in London exhibited five paintings of the series, together in a single room, for the duration of a temporary exhibition titled Monet & Architecture, devoted to Claude Monet's use of architecture as a means to structure and enliven his art. This was a rare occurrence because no museum other than the Musée d'Orsay owns or exhibits more than three in a permanent collection and none of the museum's examples were included in the exhibition.

The five paintings exhibited were the examples from the following collections:

- National Museum Cardiff
- Klassik Stiftung Weimar
- Museum of Fine Arts
- Beyeler Foundation
- An undisclosed private collection

== See also ==
- List of paintings by Claude Monet
