= Le Havre =

City in Normandy, France

Le Havre Lé Hâvre (Norman)
- Subprefecture and commune
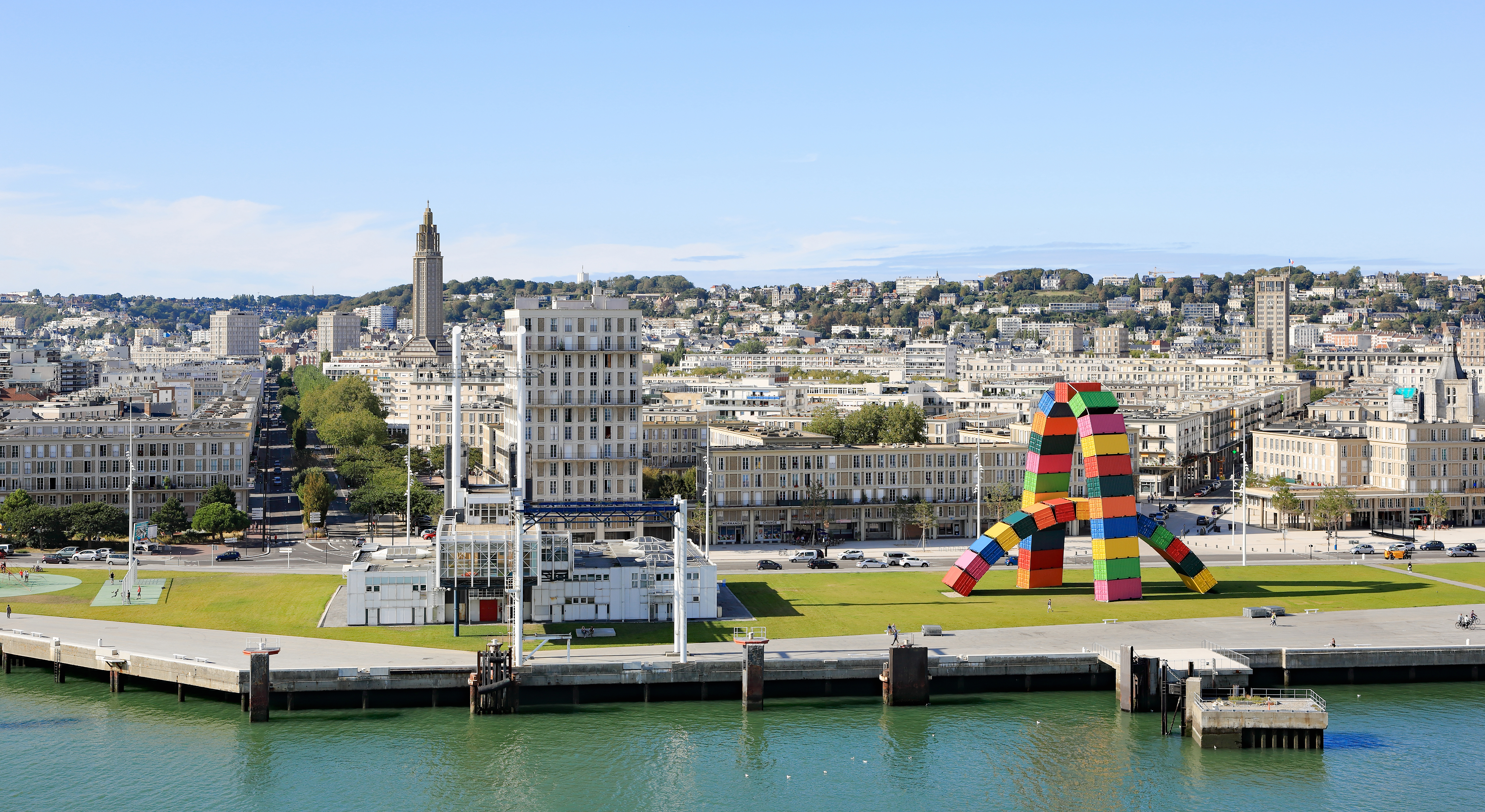
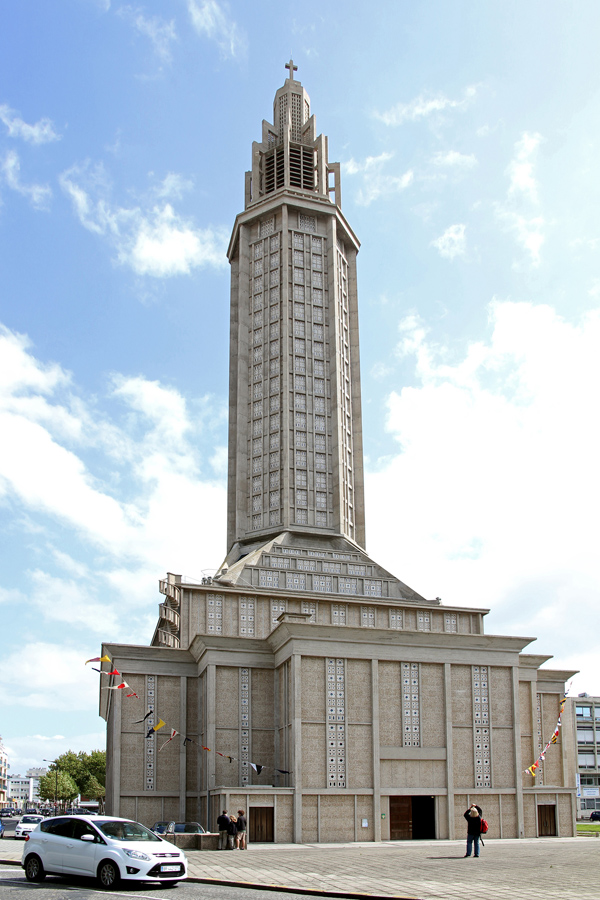
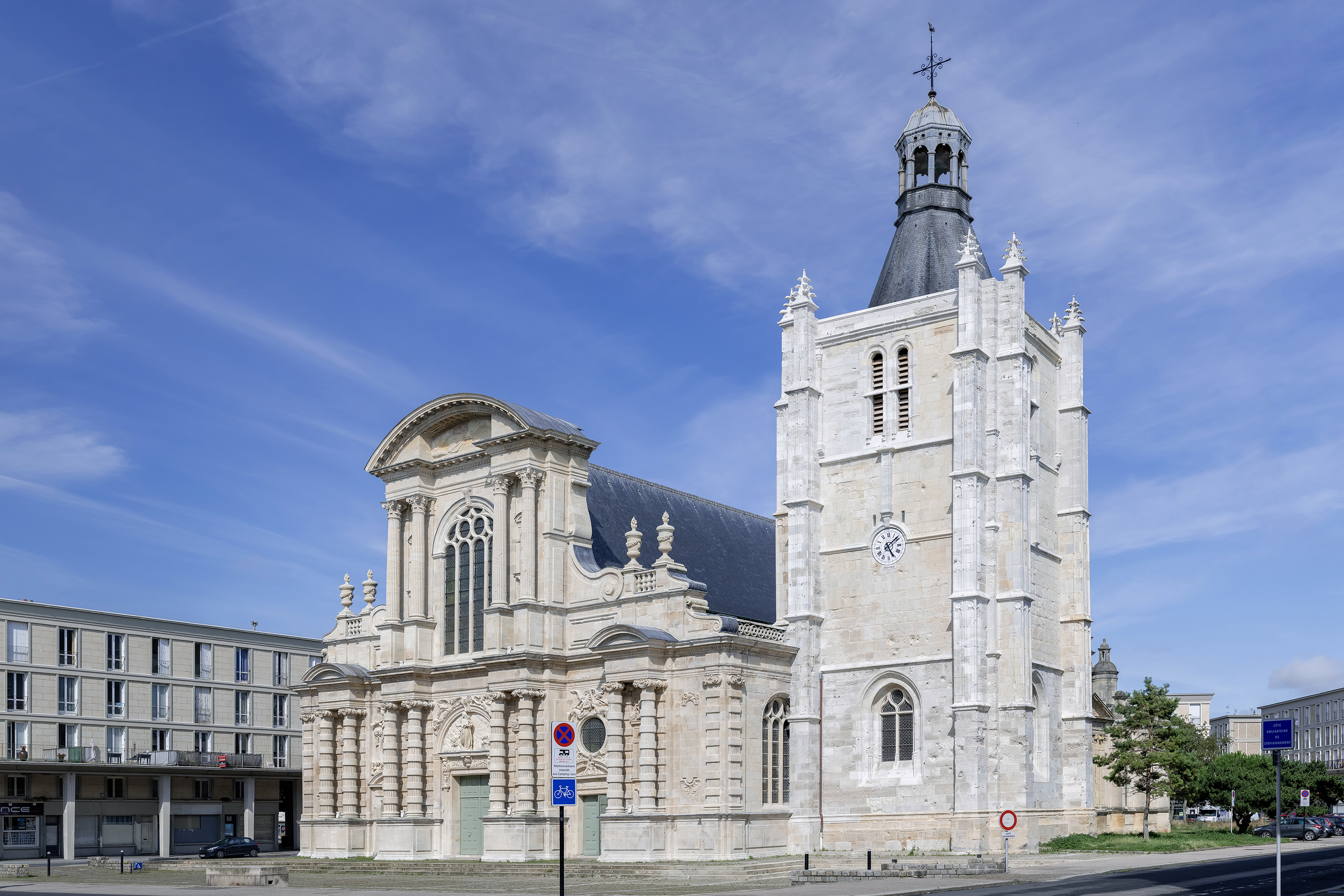
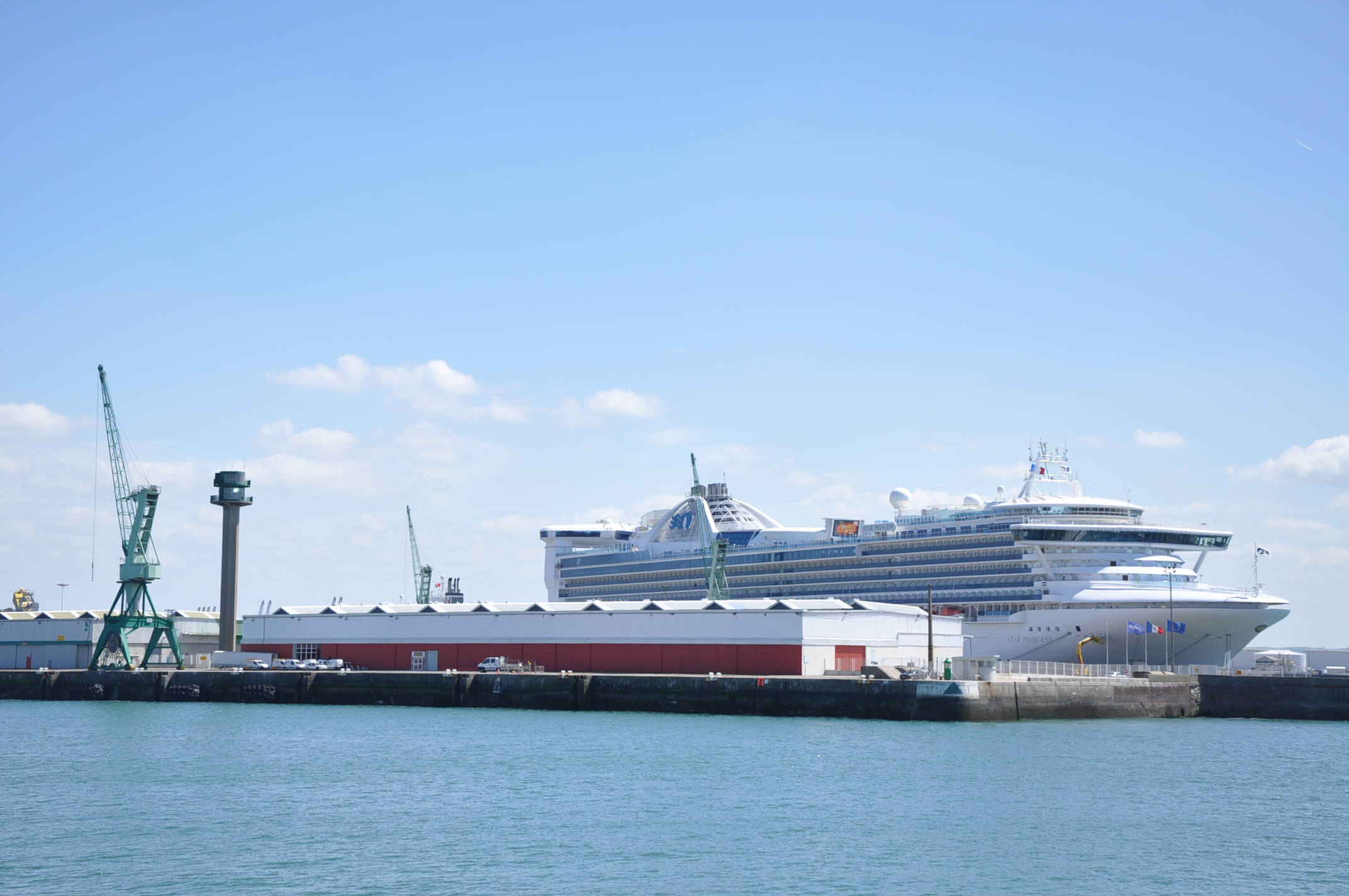
- Skyline of Le Havre, including Catène de Containers St. Joseph's Church Le Havre Cathedral Port of Le Havre

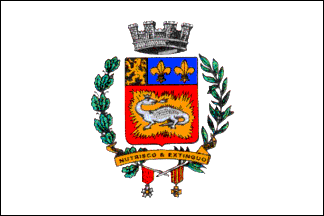
- Flag Coat of arms
- Location of Le Havre
- Location within France Location within Normandy
- Coordinates: 49°29′N 0°06′E
- Country: France
- Region: Normandy
- Department: Seine-Maritime
- Arrondissement: Le Havre
- Canton: Le Havre-1, 2, 3, 4, 5 and 6
- Intercommunality: Le Havre Seine Métropole

Government
  - Mayor (2026–32): Édouard Philippe (Horizons)
- Area^{1}: 46.95 km^{2} (18.13 sq mi)
  - Urban (2020): 194.9 km^{2} (75.3 sq mi)
  - Metro (2020): 995.8 km^{2} (384.5 sq mi)
- Population (2023): 166,687
  - Rank: 15th in France
  - Density: 3,550/km^{2} (9,195/sq mi)
  - Urban (2023): 232,175
  - Urban density: 1,191/km^{2} (3,085/sq mi)
  - Metro (2023): 336,217
  - Metro density: 337.6/km^{2} (874.5/sq mi)
- Time zone: UTC+01:00 (CET)
  - Summer (DST): UTC+02:00 (CEST)
- INSEE/Postal code: 76351 /76600, 76610, 76620
- Website: www.lehavre.fr
- Hôtel de Ville

UNESCO World Heritage Site
- Official name: Le Havre, the City Rebuilt by Auguste Perret
- Criteria: Cultural: ii, iv
- Reference: 1181
- Inscription: 2005 (29th Session)
- Area: 133 ha (330 acres)
- Buffer zone: 114 ha (280 acres)
- ^{1} French Land Register data, which excludes lakes, ponds, glaciers > 1 km^{2} (0.386 sq mi or 247 acres) and river estuaries.

Le Havre (Note: /lə ˈhɑːv(rə)/ lə HAHV(-rə); French: [lə ɑvʁ(ə)]; Norman: Lé Hâvre [lɛ ˈhɑvʁ(ə)]) is a major port city in the Seine-Maritime department in the Normandy region of northern France. It is situated on the right bank of the estuary of the river Seine on the English Channel southwest of the Pays de Caux, very close to the Prime Meridian. Le Havre is the busiest port on the northern French Coast and largest container port in France. it is the second largest city in the Normandy region of France with total population of the greater Le Havre conurbation being smaller than that of Rouen. It is also the second largest subprefecture in France, after only Reims. The name Le Havre means 'the harbour' or 'the port'. Its inhabitants are known as Havrais (masculine) or Havraises (feminine).

The city and port were founded by King Francis I in 1517. Economic development in the early modern period was hampered by religious wars, conflicts with the English, epidemics, and storms. It was from the end of the 18th century that Le Havre started growing and the port took off first with the slave trade then other international trade. After the 1944 bombings the firm of Auguste Perret began to rebuild the city in concrete. The oil, chemical, and automotive industries were dynamic during the Trente Glorieuses (postwar boom) but the 1970s marked the end of the golden age of ocean liners and the beginning of the economic crisis: the population declined, unemployment increased and remains at a high level today.

Changes in years 1990–2000 were numerous. The right won the municipal elections and committed the city to the path of reconversion, seeking to develop the service sector and new industries (aeronautics, wind turbines). The Port 2000 project increased the container capacity to compete with ports of northern Europe, transformed the southern districts of the city, and ocean liners returned. Modern Le Havre remains deeply influenced by its employment and maritime traditions. Its port is the second largest in France, after that of Marseille, for total traffic, and the largest French container port.

In 2005, UNESCO inscribed the central city of Le Havre as a World Heritage Site because of its unique post-WWII reconstruction and architecture. The André Malraux Modern Art Museum is the second of France for the number of impressionist paintings. The city has been awarded two flowers by the National Council of Towns and Villages in Bloom in the Competition of Cities and Villages in Bloom.

== Toponym ==
The name of the town was attested in 1489, even before it was founded by François I in the form le Hable de Grace then Ville de Grace in 1516, two years before its official founding. The learned and transient name of Franciscopolis in tribute to the same king, is encountered in some documents then that of Havre Marat, referring to Jean-Paul Marat during the French Revolution but was not imposed. However it explains why the complementary determinant -de-Grace was not restored. This qualifier undoubtedly referred to the Chapel of Notre Dame located at the site of the cathedral of the same name. The chapel faced the Chapel Notre Dame de Grace of Honfleur across the estuary. The common noun havre meaning 'port' was out of use at the end of the 18th or beginning of the 19th centuries but is still preserved in the phrase havre de paix meaning 'safe haven'. It is generally considered a loan from Middle Dutch from the 12th century. A Germanic origin can explain the "aspiration" of the initial h. Havre de Grace, Maryland, in the United States retains the de Grace from colonial times.

New research however focuses on the fact that the term was attested very early (12th century) and in Norman texts in the forms Hable, hafne, havene, havne, and haule makes a Dutch origin unlikely. By contrast, a Scandinavian etymology is relevant given the old Scandinavian höfn (genitive hafnar) or hafn meaning 'natural harbour' or 'haven' and the phonetic evolution of the term étrave which is assuredly of Scandinavian origin is also attested in similar forms such as estable and probably dates back to the ancient Scandinavian stafn.

== History ==
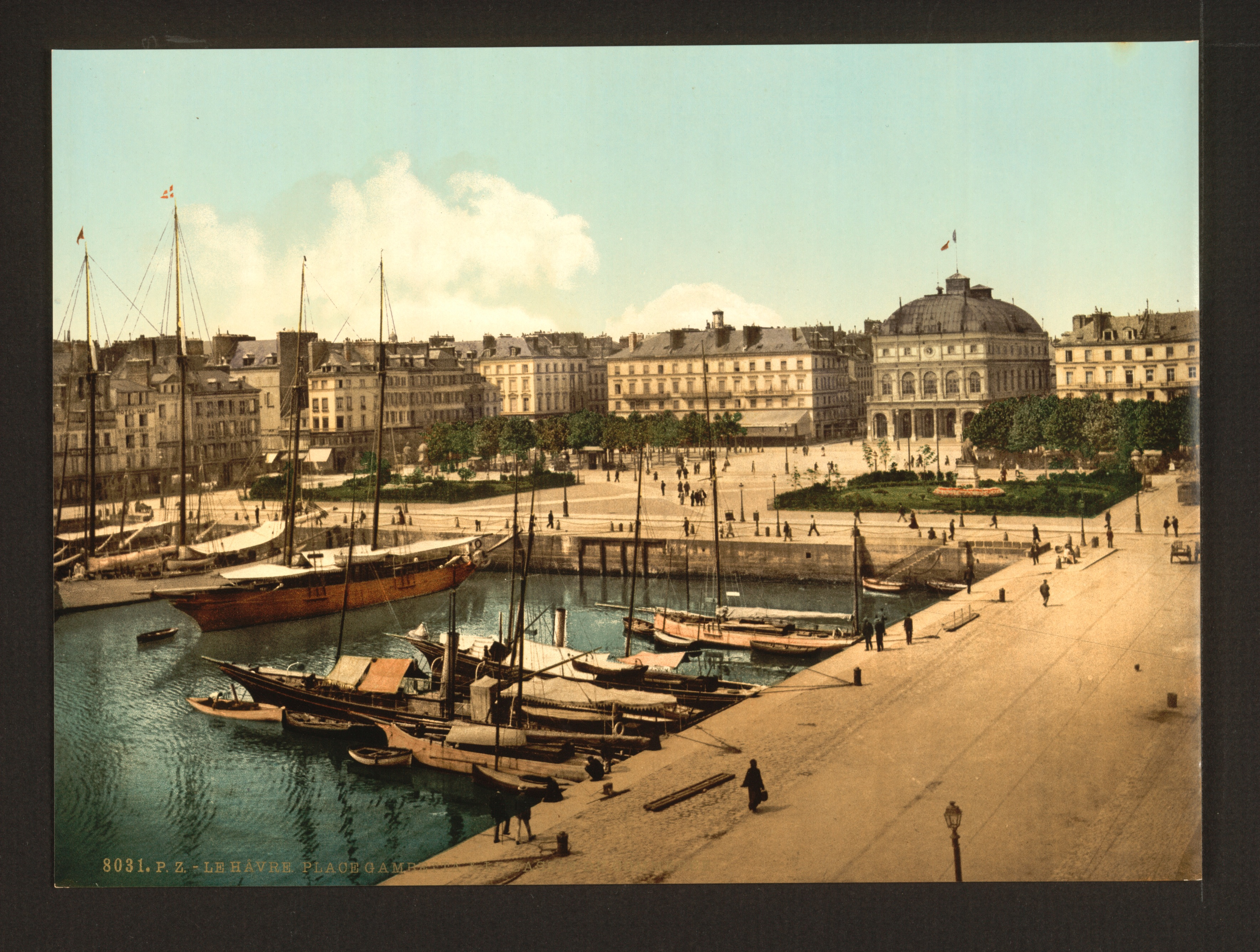
Le Havre in the late 19th century

When founded in 1517, the city was named Franciscopolis after Francis I of France. It was subsequently named Le Havre-de-Grâce ("Harbor of Grace"; hence Havre de Grace, Maryland). Its construction was ordered to replace the ancient harbours of Honfleur and Harfleur whose utility had decreased due to silting.

The history of the city is inextricably linked to its harbour. In the 18th century, as trade from the West Indies was added to that of France and Europe, Le Havre began to grow. On 19 November 1793, the city changed its name to Hâvre de Marat and later Hâvre-Marat in honor of the recently deceased Jean-Paul Marat, who was seen as a martyr of the French Revolution. By early 1795, however, Marat's memory had become somewhat tarnished, and on 13 January 1795, Hâvre-Marat changed its name once more to simply Le Havre, its modern name.

During the 19th century, Le Havre became an industrial center. In the early 19th century it was the most important port for cotton, supplying France, Switzerland, and Germany with cotton imports. Jules Siegfried was member of a Le Havre cotton printers family. Jules Lecesne was a renowned Le Havre cotton importer. At the end of World War I Le Havre had a major role as the transit port used to wind up affairs after the war.

The city was devastated during the Battle of Normandy when 5,000 people were killed and 12,000 homes were totally destroyed before its capture in Operation Astonia. Between 1945 and the 1960s, the center was extensively rebuilt to designs of a modernist style by Auguste Perret.

=== Heraldry ===
Current arms of Le Havre. The salamander is the badge of Francis I; the lion is from the Belgian coat of arms; it replaced a fleur-de-lis in 1926 to remember the Belgian government in exile in Le Havre during the First World War).	Gules, a salamander Argent crowned and enflamed Or, a chief Azure charged with three fleurs-de-lis Or, a canton Sable charged with a lion Or armed and langued Gules.
Arms of Le Havre under the First French Empire	Gules, a salamander Argent crowned and enflamed Or, a chief Azure with three mullets Or; a quarter Azure with a letter N surmounted by a mullet Or.

== Geography ==
=== Location ===
Le Havre is located 50 kilometres (31 miles) west of Rouen on the shore of the English Channel and at the mouth of the Seine. Numerous roads link to Le Havre with the main access roads being the A29 autoroute from Amiens and the A13 autoroute from Paris linking to the A131 autoroute.

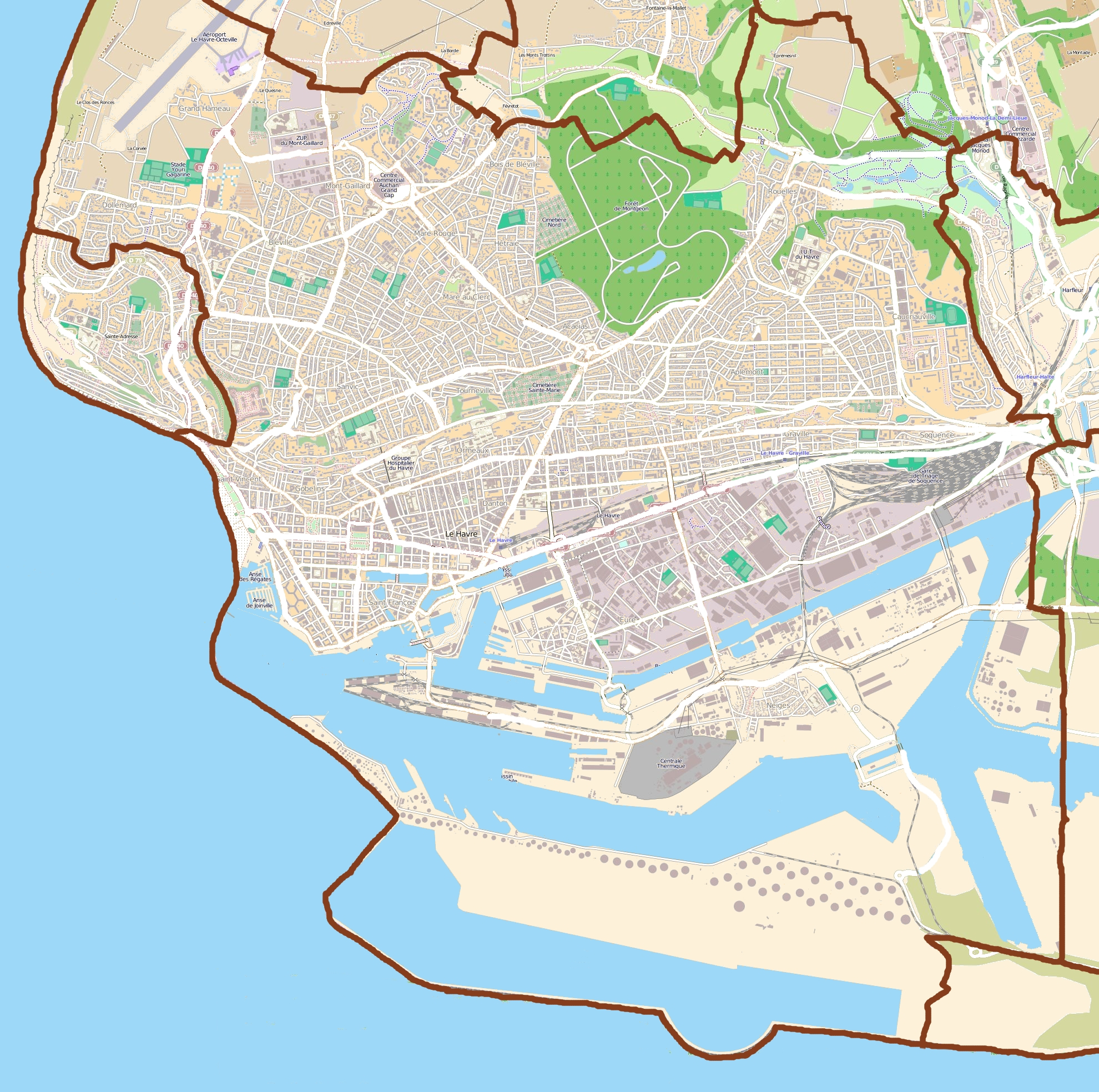
Map of Le Havre: to the south the Seine estuary; to the west the English Channel.

Administratively, Le Havre is a commune in the Normandy region in the west of the department of Seine-Maritime. The urban area of Le Havre corresponds roughly to the territory of the Agglomeration community of Le Havre (CODAH) which includes 17 communes and 250,000 people. It occupies the south-western tip of the natural region of Pays de Caux where it is the largest city. Le Havre is sandwiched between the coast of the Channel from south-west to north-west and the estuary of the Seine to the south.

=== Geology and terrain ===
Le Havre belongs to the Paris Basin which was formed in the Mesozoic period. The Paris Basin consists of sedimentary rocks. The commune of Le Havre consists of two areas separated by a natural cliff edge: one part in the lower part of the town to the south including the harbour, the city centre and the suburbs. It was built on former marshland and mudflats that were drained in the 16th century. The soil consists of several metres of alluvium or silt deposited by the Seine. The city centre was rebuilt after the Second World War using a metre of flattened rubble as a foundation.

The upper town to the north, is part of the cauchois plateau: the neighbourhood of Dollemard is its highest point (between 90 and 115 metres (295 and 377 feet) above sea level). The plateau is covered with a layer of flinty clay and a fertile silt. The bedrock consists of a large thickness of chalk measuring up to 200 m (656 ft) deep. Because of the slope the coast is affected by the risk of landslides.

=== Climate ===
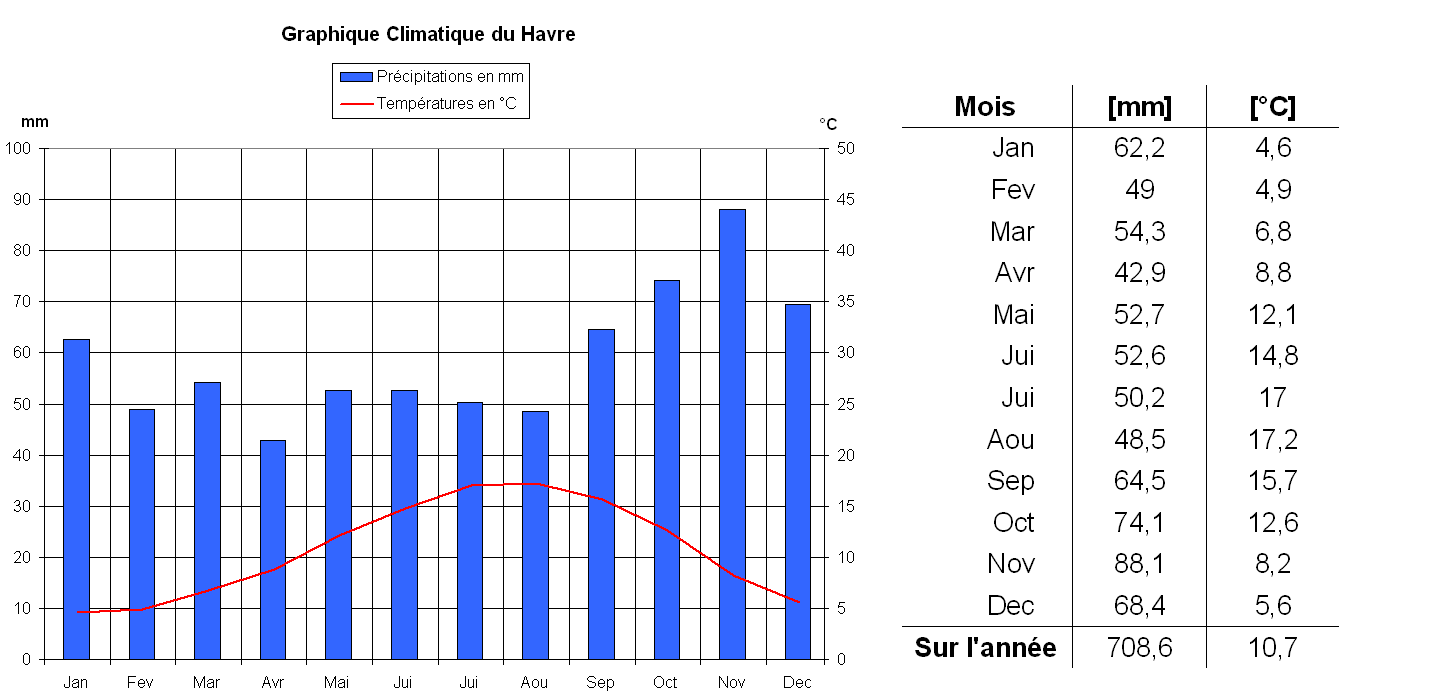
Climatic Graph for Le Havre

Due to its location on the coast of the Channel, the climate of Le Havre is temperate oceanic. Days without wind are rare. There are maritime influences throughout the year. According to the records of the meteorological station of the Cap de la Heve (from 1961 to 1990), the temperature drops below 0 °C (32 °F) on 24.9 days per year and it rises above 25 °C (77 °F) on 11.3 days per year. The average annual sunshine duration is 1,785.8 hours per year.

Precipitation is distributed throughout the year, with a maximum in autumn and winter. The months of June and July are marked by some thunderstorms on average 2 days per month. One of the characteristics of the region is the high variability of the temperature, even during the day. The prevailing winds are from the southwest sector for strong winds and north-north-east for breezes, snowstorms occur in winter, especially in January and February.

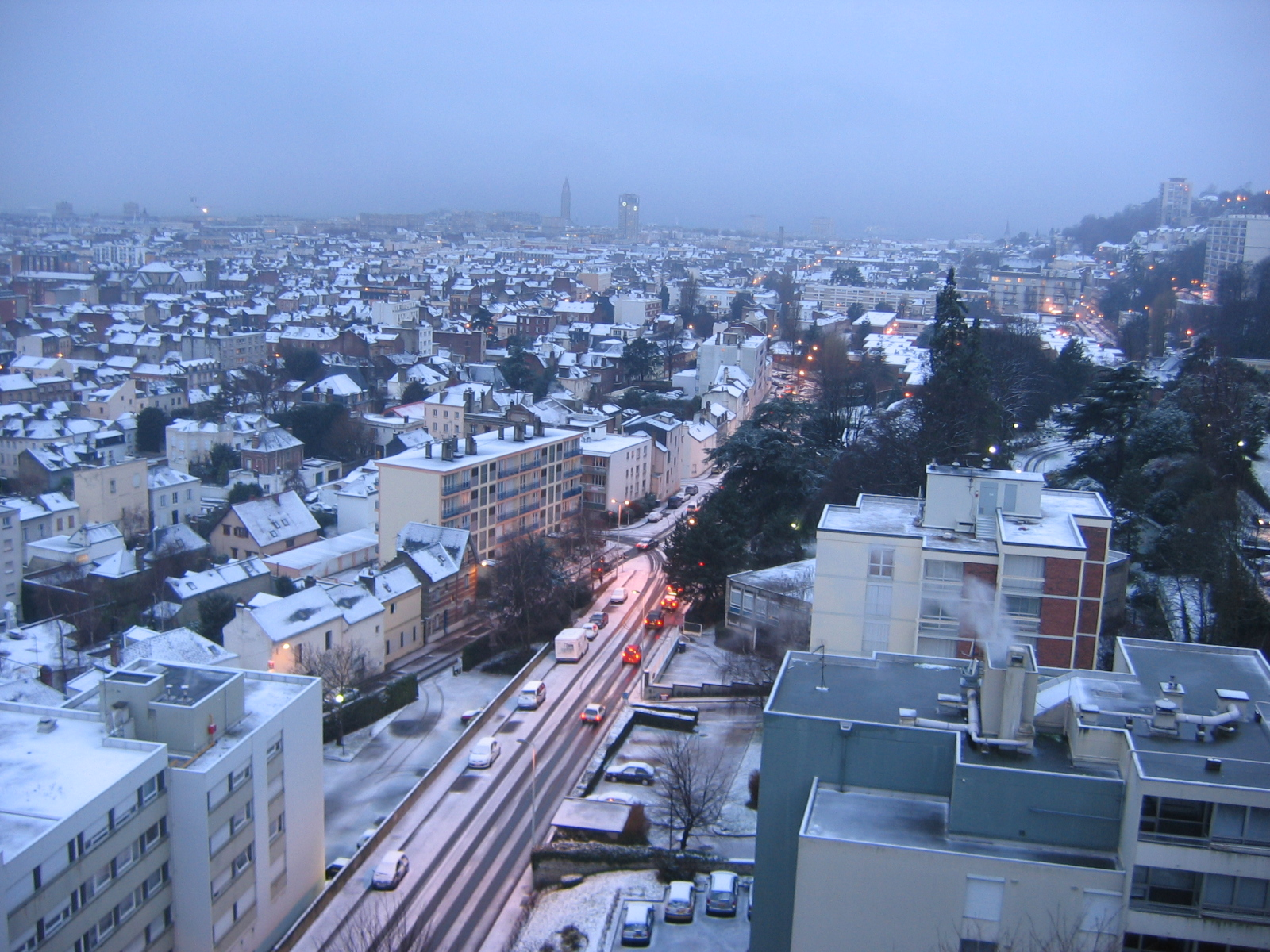
Le Havre under snow

The absolute speed record for wind at Le Havre – Cap de la Heve was recorded on 16 October 1987 at 180 kilometres per hour (112 miles per hour).

The main natural hazards are floods, storms, and storm surges. The lower town is subject to a rising water table. The lack of watercourses within the commune prevents flooding from overflows. Le Havre's beach may rarely experience flooding known as "flooding from storms". These are caused by the combination of strong winds, high waves, and a large tidal range.

Comparison of local Meteorological data with other cities in France
Town	Sunshine (hours/yr)	Rain (mm/yr)	Snow (days/yr)	Storm (days/yr)	Fog (days/yr)
National average	1,973	770	14	22	40
Le Havre	1,786	709	11	13	53
Paris	1,661	637	12	18	10
Nice	2,724	767	1	29	1
Strasbourg	1,693	665	29	29	56
Brest	1,605	1,211	7	12	75

Climate data for Le Havre (Cap de la Heve), elevation: 100 m (330 ft) (1991–2020 normals, extremes 1891–present)
Month	Jan	Feb	Mar	Apr	May	Jun	Jul	Aug	Sep	Oct	Nov	Dec	Year
Record high °C (°F)	15.1 (59.2)	20.3 (68.5)	24.5 (76.1)	27.1 (80.8)	32.4 (90.3)	38.7 (101.7)	38.2 (100.8)	36.3 (97.3)	33.6 (92.5)	28.5 (83.3)	20.0 (68.0)	16.4 (61.5)	38.7 (101.7)
Mean daily maximum °C (°F)	7.6 (45.7)	8.0 (46.4)	10.5 (50.9)	13.3 (55.9)	16.2 (61.2)	19.0 (66.2)	20.9 (69.6)	21.2 (70.2)	19.1 (66.4)	15.5 (59.9)	11.3 (52.3)	8.4 (47.1)	14.3 (57.7)
Daily mean °C (°F)	5.7 (42.3)	6.0 (42.8)	8.1 (46.6)	10.4 (50.7)	13.3 (55.9)	16.0 (60.8)	18.0 (64.4)	18.4 (65.1)	16.4 (61.5)	13.1 (55.6)	9.3 (48.7)	6.5 (43.7)	11.8 (53.2)
Mean daily minimum °C (°F)	3.9 (39.0)	3.9 (39.0)	5.6 (42.1)	7.5 (45.5)	10.3 (50.5)	13.1 (55.6)	15.1 (59.2)	15.6 (60.1)	13.7 (56.7)	10.8 (51.4)	7.4 (45.3)	4.7 (40.5)	9.3 (48.7)
Record low °C (°F)	−13.8 (7.2)	−12.5 (9.5)	−7.8 (18.0)	−1.0 (30.2)	1.2 (34.2)	4.4 (39.9)	8.0 (46.4)	8.4 (47.1)	3.3 (37.9)	−0.2 (31.6)	−8.5 (16.7)	−8.6 (16.5)	−13.8 (7.2)
Average precipitation mm (inches)	67.5 (2.66)	53.7 (2.11)	52.5 (2.07)	52.3 (2.06)	56.5 (2.22)	58.0 (2.28)	48.7 (1.92)	66.0 (2.60)	65.4 (2.57)	86.2 (3.39)	87.5 (3.44)	95.5 (3.76)	789.8 (31.09)
Average precipitation days (≥ 1.0 mm)	12.4	11.2	10.1	9.6	9.0	8.6	7.8	9.2	9.1	12.4	13.5	14.7	127.7
Average relative humidity (%)	84	79	78	75	78	78	76	77	77	82	83	84	79
Average dew point °C (°F)	4 (39)	2 (36)	4 (39)	5 (41)	9 (48)	12 (54)	13 (55)	14 (57)	12 (54)	10 (50)	6 (43)	5 (41)	8 (46)
Mean monthly sunshine hours	73.3	90.6	122.1	167.4	222.4	221.3	229.2	230.3	167.5	131.6	78.4	56.5	1,790.6
Source 1: Meteociel
Source 2: Infoclimat.fr (sunshine hours) Time and Date

=== Environment ===
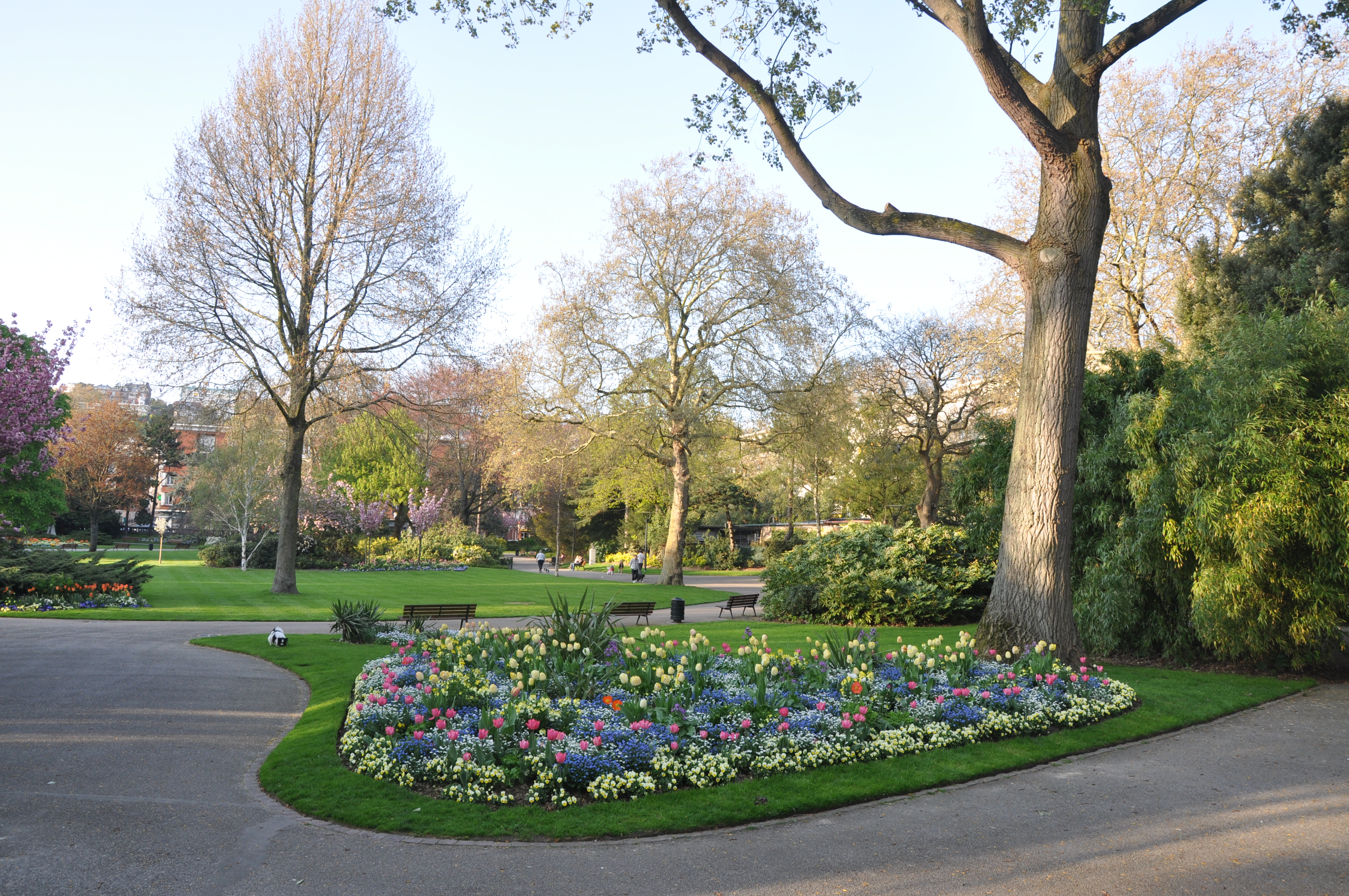
Saint-Roch Square.

A study by Aphekom comparing ten large French cities showed that Le Havre is the least polluted urban commune of France. Le Havre is also the third best city in France with more than 100,000 inhabitants for air quality. A Carbon accounting showed in 2009 that the municipality ejected some 32,500 tonnes of CO_{2} per year. In 2011 the average annual emissions of sulfur dioxide by industry was between three micrograms per cubic metre in the centre of Le Havre to twelve micrograms per cubic metre in the district of Caucriauville.

The municipality has set a target to reduce emissions of CO_{2} by 3% per year. To achieve this solar panels have been installed on several municipal buildings (city hall, hanging gardens). Since 2008, Le Havre has been part of the network of Energy Cities and, in this context, it applies the steps of Agenda 21 and an Environmental Approach to Urban Planning. The city has received many awards of eco-labels several times (Energy of the Future label in 2009–2011, sustainable Earth label in 2009). Since 1998, Le Havre's beach has received the Blue Flag yearly thanks to its range of facilities, which extend over 30,000 m^{2}.

Le Havre has kept extensive green areas (750 hectares or 41 m^{2} per inhabitant), the two largest areas are the Montgeon Forest and Rouelles Park which are both located in the upper town. The gardens of the Priory of Graville and the hanging gardens offer views of the lower city. In the city centre, Saint-Roch Square and the City Hall Gardens provide the people with urban recreation areas. Various ecosystems are represented in the Beach Gardens and the Hauser Park (caves). Finally, the Plateau of Dollemard was classified as a "Sensitive Natural Area" of the department in 2001 to protect its landscape and ecosystems on the cliff. The streets are lined with 13,000 trees of 150 different varieties.

== Layout ==
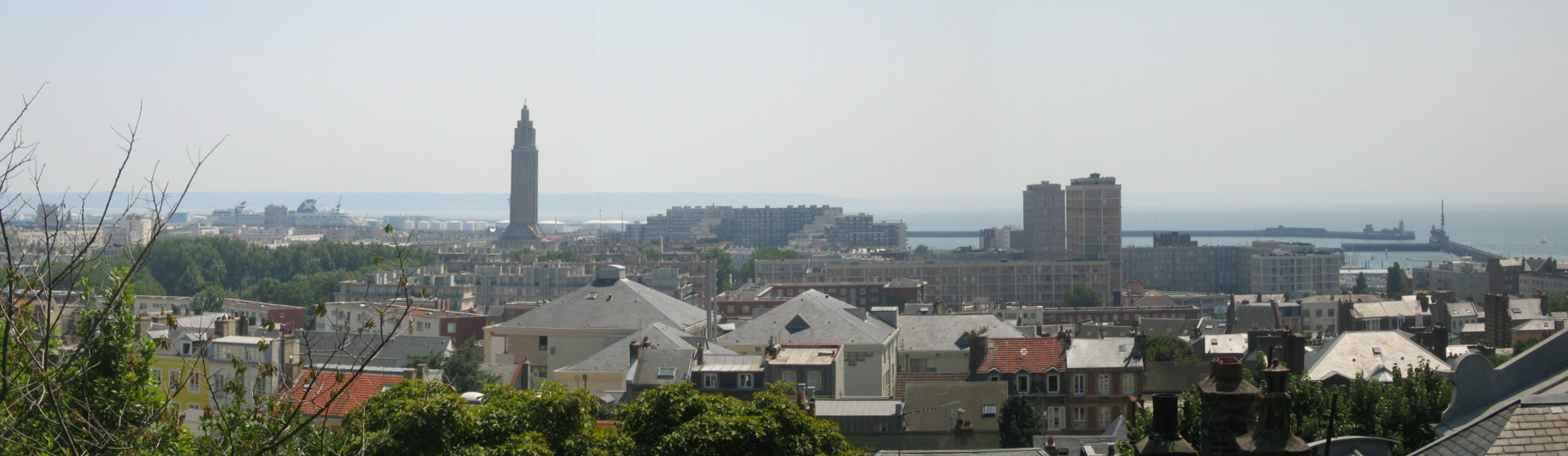
Le Havre skyline in 2005

=== Lower city ===
==== City rebuilt after 1945 ====
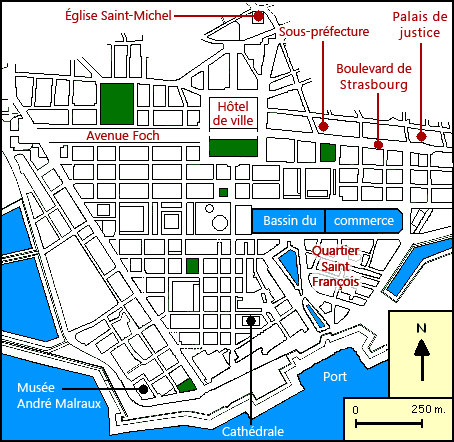
Plan of Le Havre and its town centre rebuilt after the Second World War

Largely destroyed by the Allies during the Second World War, the city was rebuilt according to the plans of the architect Auguste Perret between 1945 and 1964. Only the City Hall and the Church of Saint Joseph (107-metre high (351 ft)) were personally designed by Auguste Perret. In commending the reconstruction work UNESCO listed the city of Le Havre on 15 July 2005 as a World Heritage Site. This area of 133 hectares (330 acres) is one of the few inscribed contemporary sites in Europe. The architecture of the area is characterized by the use of precast concrete using a system of a modular frame of 6.24 m (20.5 ft) and straight lines.

Another notable architectural work of the central city is that of the House of Culture built in 1982 by the Brazilian architect Oscar Niemeyer and nicknamed "the Volcano" because of the shape of the building. From 2012, this place was refurbished both inside and outside with fairly significant changes approved by the architect including greater openness to the outside of the plaza.

The Notre Dame and Perrey neighbourhoods are mainly residential. Les Halles is one of the commercial hubs of the city. The Saint Francis neighborhood was also rebuilt beginning in 1950 but in a radically different architectural style: the buildings are brick and have pitched slate roofs. This is the restaurant district and the fish market.

==== Neighbourhoods ====
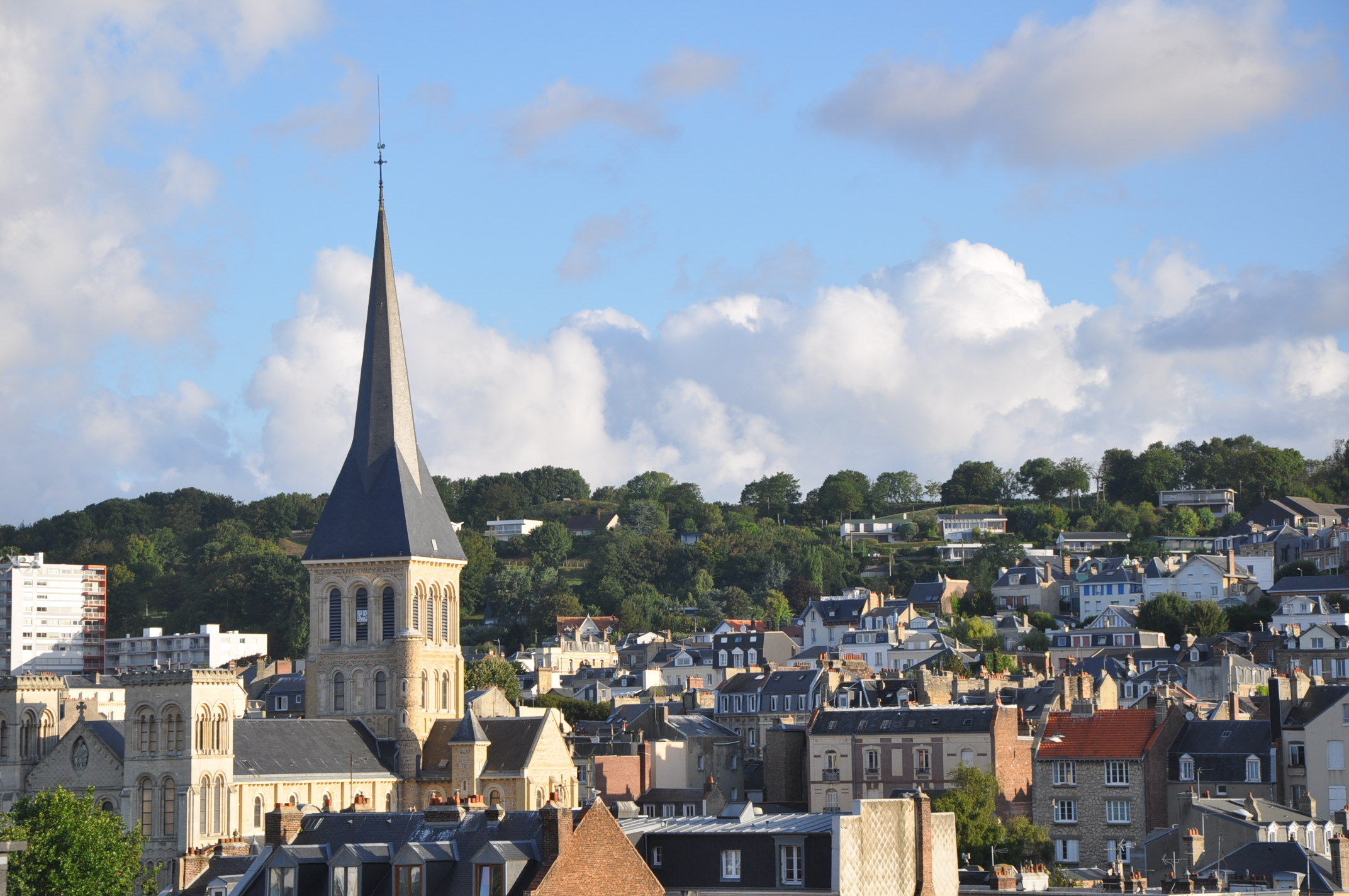
The neighborhood of the church of Saint-Vincent extending toward the coast

To the east and north of the rebuilt central city are a stretch of old neighbourhoods (Danton, Saint-Vincent, Graville, Massillon, etc.) which were spared the bombings of World War II. The buildings, usually in brick, dated to the 19th and the first half of the 20th centuries. The shops are concentrated along several major roads in the Rond-Point neighbourhood. During the 1990s and 2000s, these neighborhoods have seen major redevelopments, particularly in the context of an OPAH: improvement of habitat by rehabilitation or reconstruction, creation of public facilities, and revitalization of business.

At the end of the 20th century and beginning of the 21st century, the area around the railway station has undergone a major transformation. As the station is the gateway to the city with the main avenues intersecting here. New buildings have sprung up (University of Le Havre, the conservatory, headquarters of the SPB (Provident Society Bank), and of CMA CGM, Novotel, Matmut, new CCI) some of which were designed by renowned architects. The bus station, certified NF since 2005, has been refurbished. North of the station, another construction project in place of the dilapidated island of Turgot-Magellan will be opened in 2013, including 12,500 m^{2} (135,000 sq ft) of office space and an eight-storey hotel, complete with shops on the ground-floor.

==== Southern districts ====
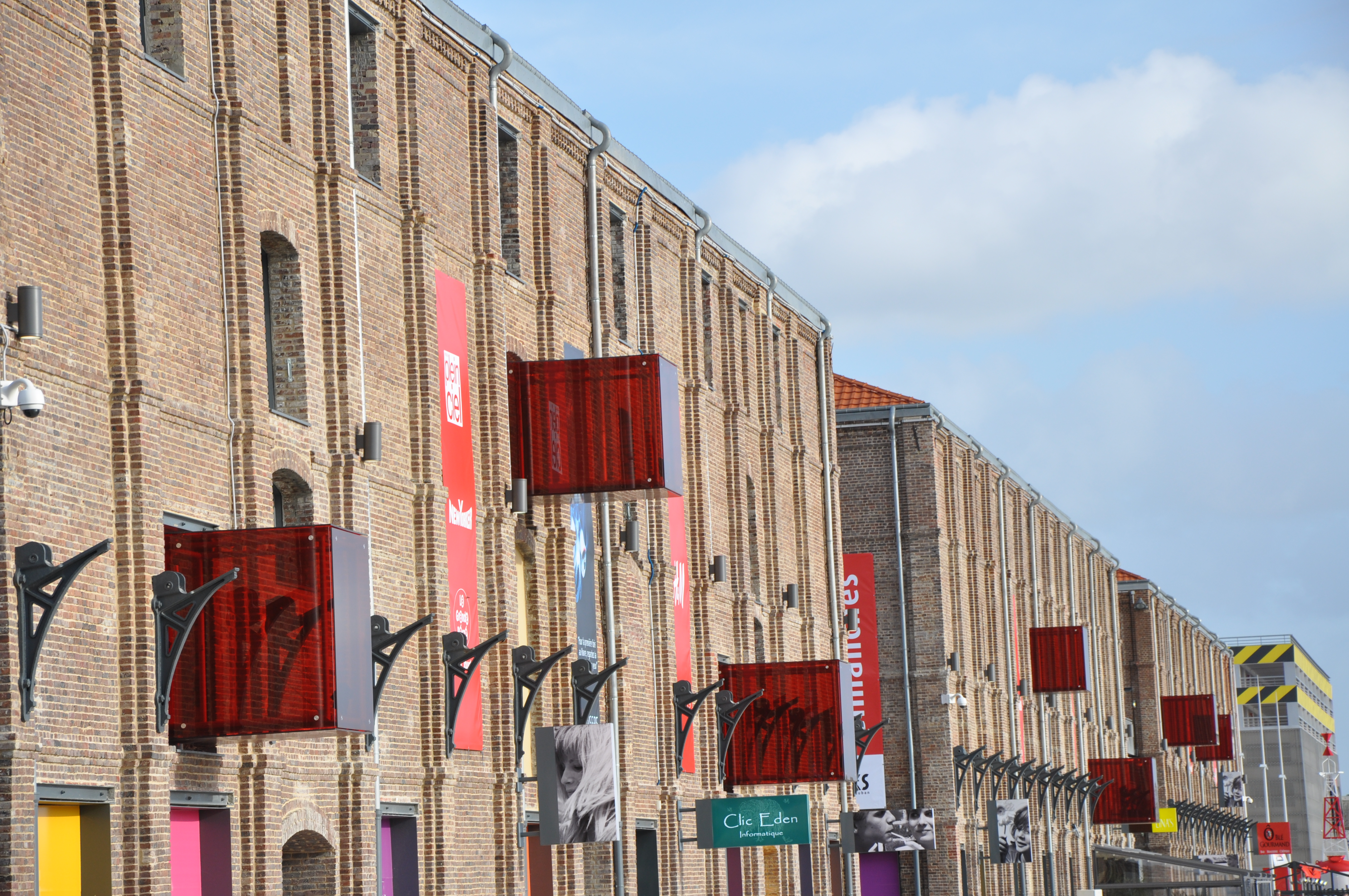
Commercial area of the south side of the Vauban Docks in 2009

The southern districts of Le Havre are mainly used for industrial and port activities. There are buildings in brick from the 19th century, large developments (Chicago, Les Neiges), worker estates, SMEs, warehouses, dock and port facilities, and transport infrastructure.

The southern districts have for some years experienced profound change due to European funding. It is revitalizing areas neglected by industrial and port activities by developing tertiary activities. Thus, the docks have been completely transformed into sports and entertainment complexes (Dock Océane), a mall (Docks Vauban), and an exhibition hall (Docks Café). Les Bains Des Docks was designed by the architect Jean Nouvel. At the end of 2012 students from Sciences Po's Europe-Asia undergraduate college campus and from INSA integrated new buildings next to the ISEL (Higher Institute of logistics studies) and the future ENSM (Ecole Nationale Supérieure Maritime). The new medical axis around the new Clinic des Ormeaux was built in the neighbourhoods where many homes are planned with the aim of promoting social mix. The City of the Sea and of Sustainable Development (Odyssey 21) will be organized around a metal tower one hundred metres high designed by Jean Nouvel: the project was suspended in 2007 but the work should finally begin in 2013. The municipality has to attract some 300,000 visitors per year.

=== Upper town ===
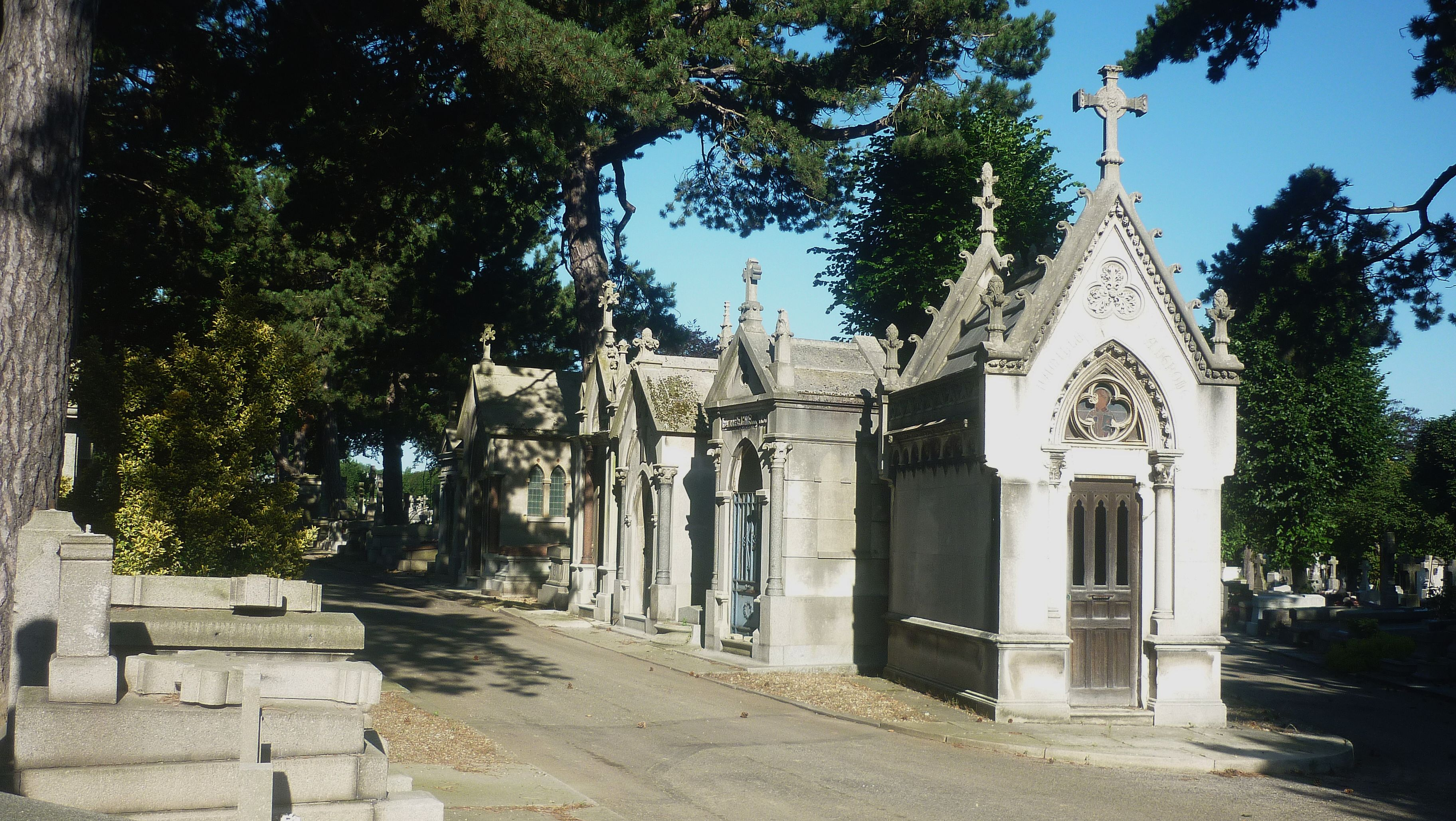
The cemetery of Sainte-Marie

The upper town is composed of three parts: the "coast", the suburban districts of the plateau, and large peripheral housing estates.

The neighbourhoods on the "coast" (the Dead Cliff) are residential – more prosperous in the western part (Les Ormeaux, Rue Felix Faure) and more modest to the east (St. Cecilia, Aplemont). The Jenner tunnel passes under the "coast" and connects the upper town to the lower town. It is also on the coast that there are two fortifications of the city, Forts Sainte-Adresse and Tourneville, and the main cemetery (Sainte-Marie cemetery). With the demise of the military functions of the city, the forts are gradually being converted: Fort Sainte-Adresse houses the Hanging Gardens and Fort Tourneville hosted the Tetris project in 2013 – an axis of contemporary music with concert halls and rehearsal studios.

To the north of the "coast" suburban districts such as Rouelles, Sainte-Cecile, la Mare au Clerc, Sanvic, Bleville, and Dollemard were developed during the first half of the 19th century. In their extension North-west between Bleville and Octeville airport a new area is being developed: "Les Hauts de Bleville". This eco-district made up of housing units to HQE standards, a Joint Development Area (ZAC), and a school should have a total of 1,000 housing units.

The peripheral suburbs of the commune grew in the postwar period. These are large housing estates in Caucriauville, Bois de Bleville, Mont-Gaillard, and Mare-rouge where a disadvantaged population is concentrated. In October 2004 the National Agency for Urban Renewal (ANRU) signed with the municipality of Havre the first agreement to finance the rehabilitation of these areas. This finance agreement provides more than 340 million euros for the housing estates in the northern districts, where about 41,000 people reside. This development extends the budget for the Grand Projet de Ville (GPV). It allows the demolition and rebuilding of more than 1,700 homes.

== Transport ==
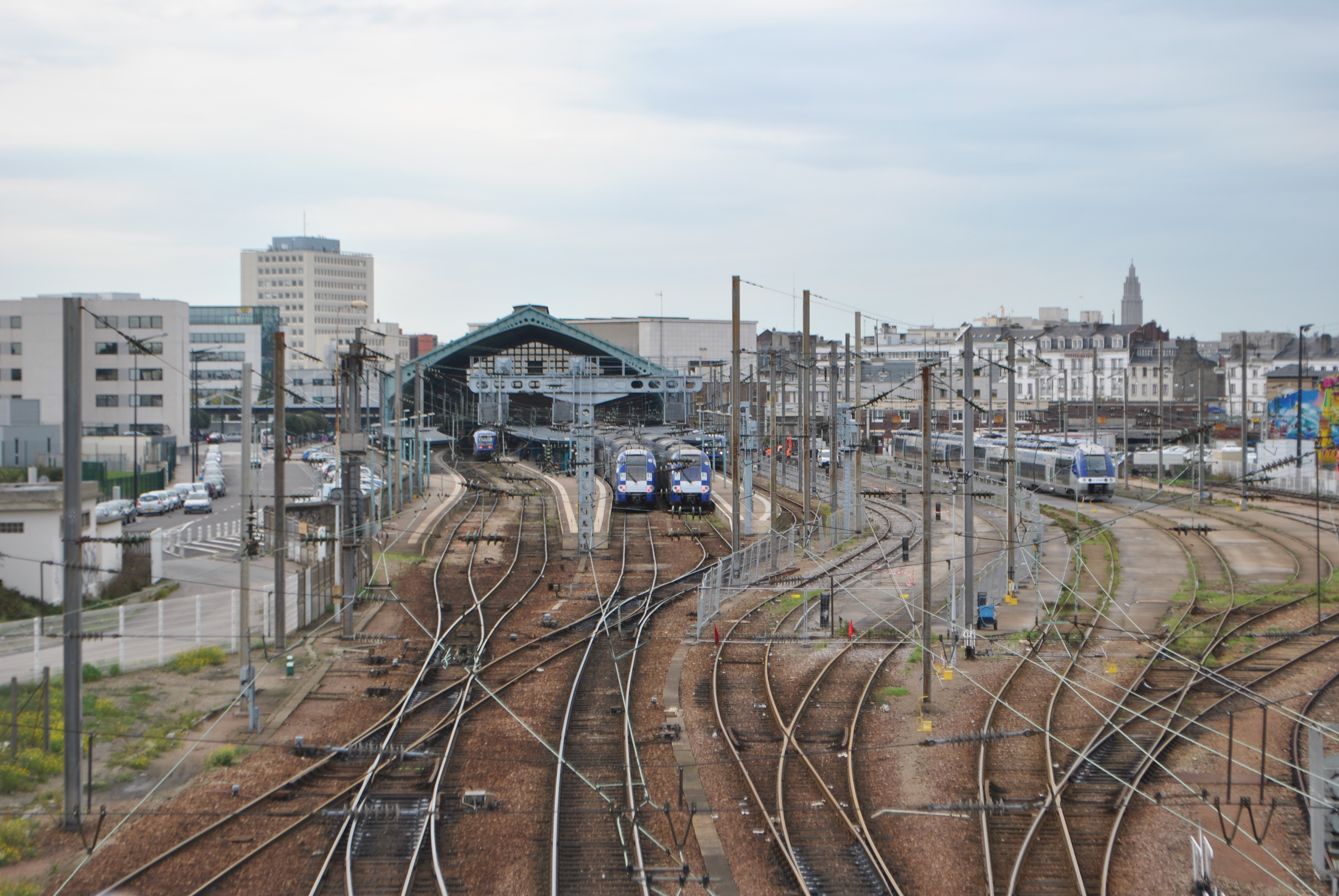
Le Havre station

For a long time Le Havre has exploited the strengths of its coastal location but also suffered from its relative isolation. This is why the accessibility of the city has been improved with the harbour highway A131 (E05) which links Le Havre to the A13 autoroute over Tancarville Bridge. The city is one hour from Rouen and one and a half-hour from Île-de-France. More recently the A29 autoroute (E44) has connected Le Havre to the north of France and passes over the Normandy Bridge which makes Amiens (in the north-east) two hours away and Caen (in the south-west) one hour.

The TER network was modernized with the creation of the LER line in 2001 and direct services to Fécamp in 2005. Thirteen Corail trains of the Paris–Le Havre line link Le Havre station with Bréauté-Beuzeville, Yvetot, Rouen and Paris Saint-Lazare station. In addition there is a TGV daily service to Le Havre: it has connected the city to Marseille since December 2004 serving Rouen, Mantes-la-Jolie, Versailles, Massy, Lyon, Avignon, Aix-en-Provence, and Saint Charles station in Marseille. There are also local services from Le Havre station to Rolleville and Fécamp. Le Havre-Graville station in the eastern part of the city is served by trains to Rolleville.

No direct rail link connects Le Havre and Caen yet many projects – known as the "Southwest Line" – to link Le Havre to the left bank of the Seine downstream from Rouen, near the estuary of the river, were studied in the second half of the 19th century and the beginning of the 20th century but none have been realized. By public transport it is necessary to go to Rouen by train or bus (using No. 20 Green Bus). There is a Gray Coach to Étretat and Fécamp and there is VTNI for destinations in the Seine valley and Rouen who provide inter-urban services on behalf of the Department of Seine-Maritime. AirPlus provides a shuttle service to the railway stations and airports of Paris.

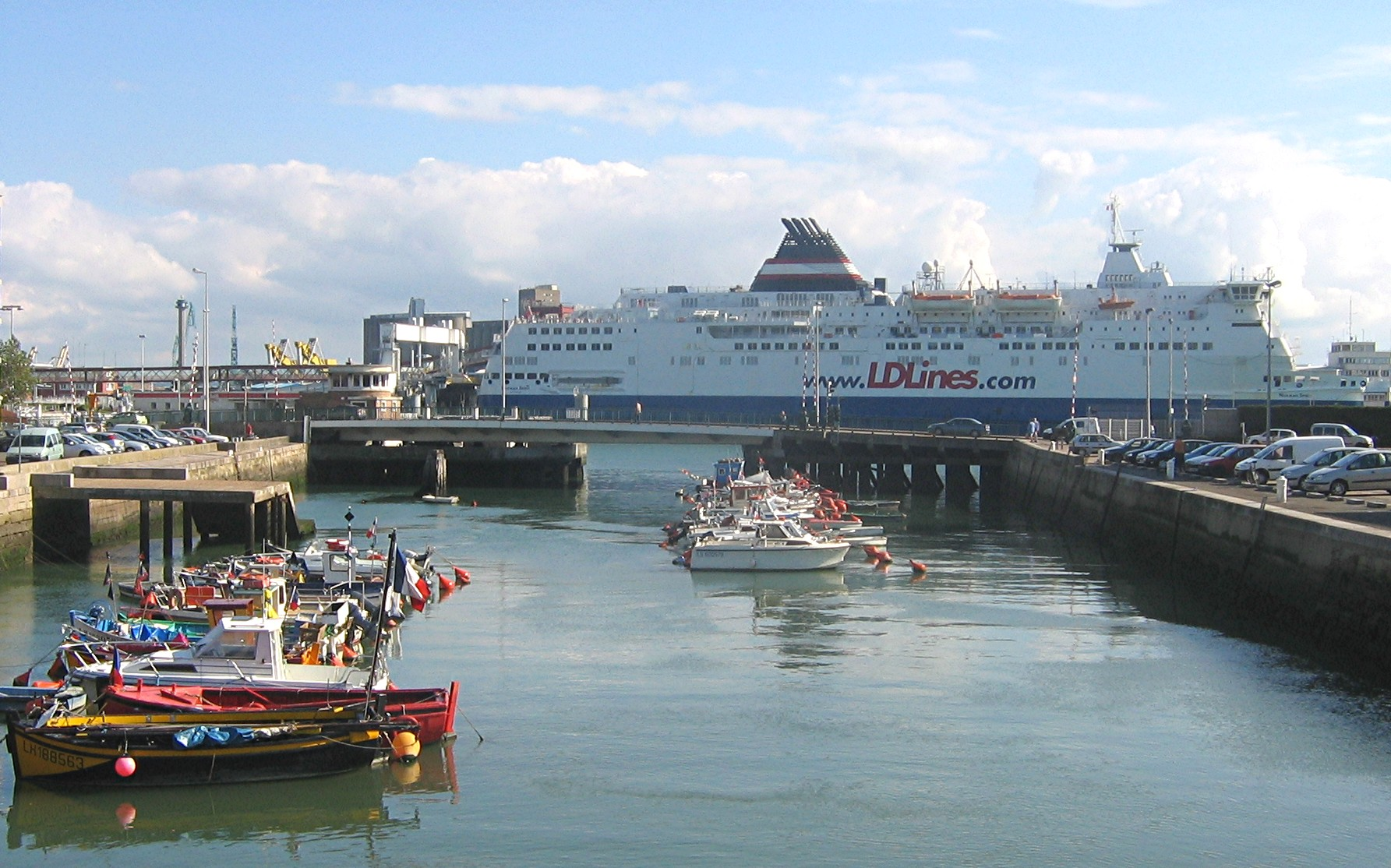
A LD Lines ferry in the port of Le Havre

Le Havre Octeville Airport which is located 5 km (3 mi) north of Le Havre at the town of Octeville-sur-Mer and managed by CODAH. The airport does not have any scheduled services to or from Le Havre at this time. Currently, air travel is served by the nearest Caen–Carpiquet Airport which is located approximately 54 km away from Le Havre.

The main destination is the Transport hub of Lyon. Many holiday destinations are offered each year (Tunisia, Balearic Islands, Portugal, Greece, Bulgaria, etc.) through local travel agencies that charter aircraft. There is also the Flying club Jean Maridor at the airport.

The Channel maritime links with Portsmouth in southern England with P&O Ferries ended on 30 September 2005 to be taken over by LD Lines who had changed the configuration. Two services to Portsmouth are provided daily from the Terminal de la Citadelle until ceasing operations in 2014, the route has since been taken over by Brittany Ferries. It will cease in September 2026. The link to Ireland was moved to the port of Cherbourg.

Crossing times to Portsmouth vary from five hours and thirty minutes to eight hours. Popular alternative routes going to areas close to Le Havre include Newhaven to Dieppe, and Poole to Cherbourg.

=== Urban transport ===
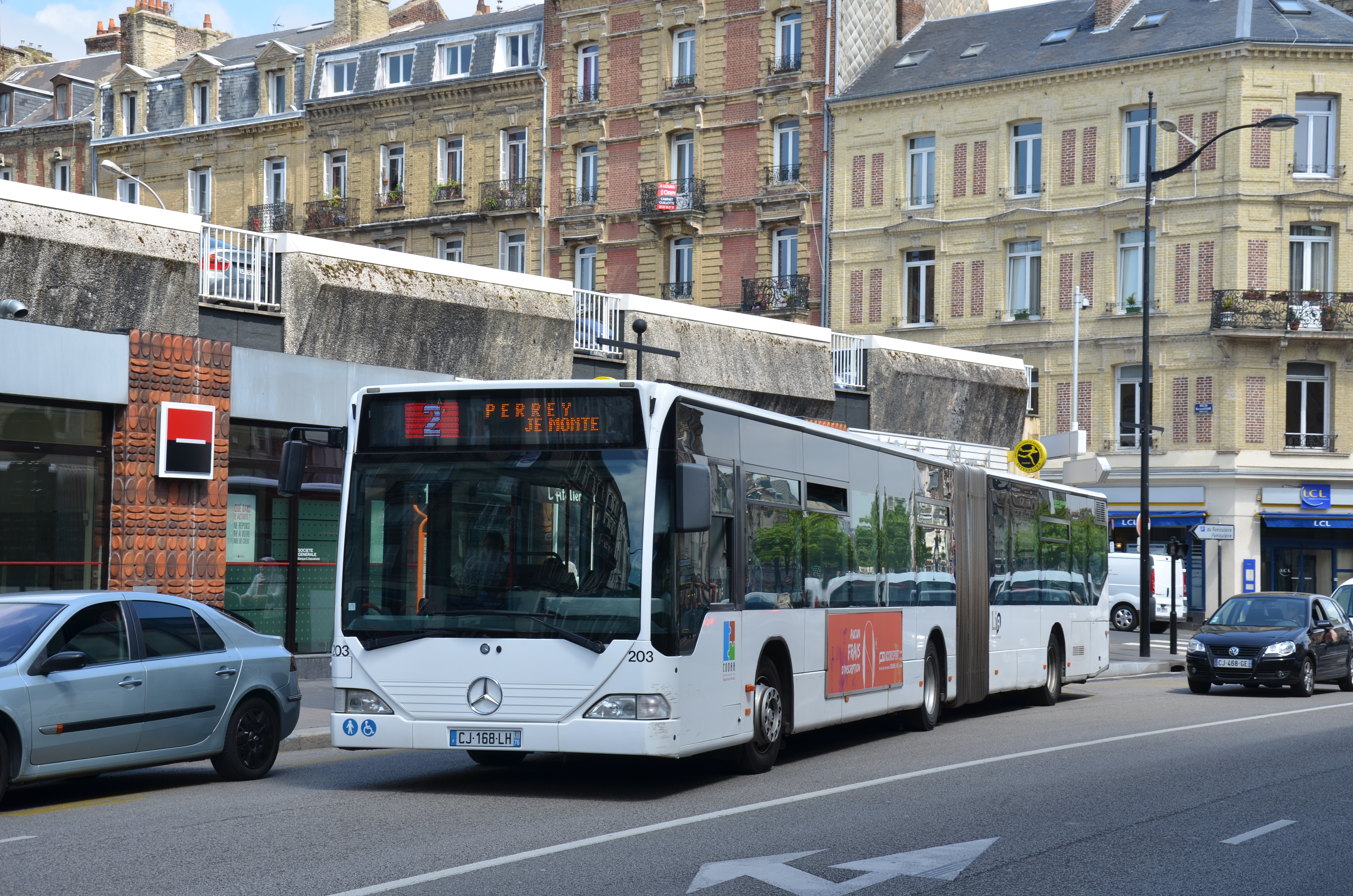
Mercedes-Benz Citaro of the CTPO

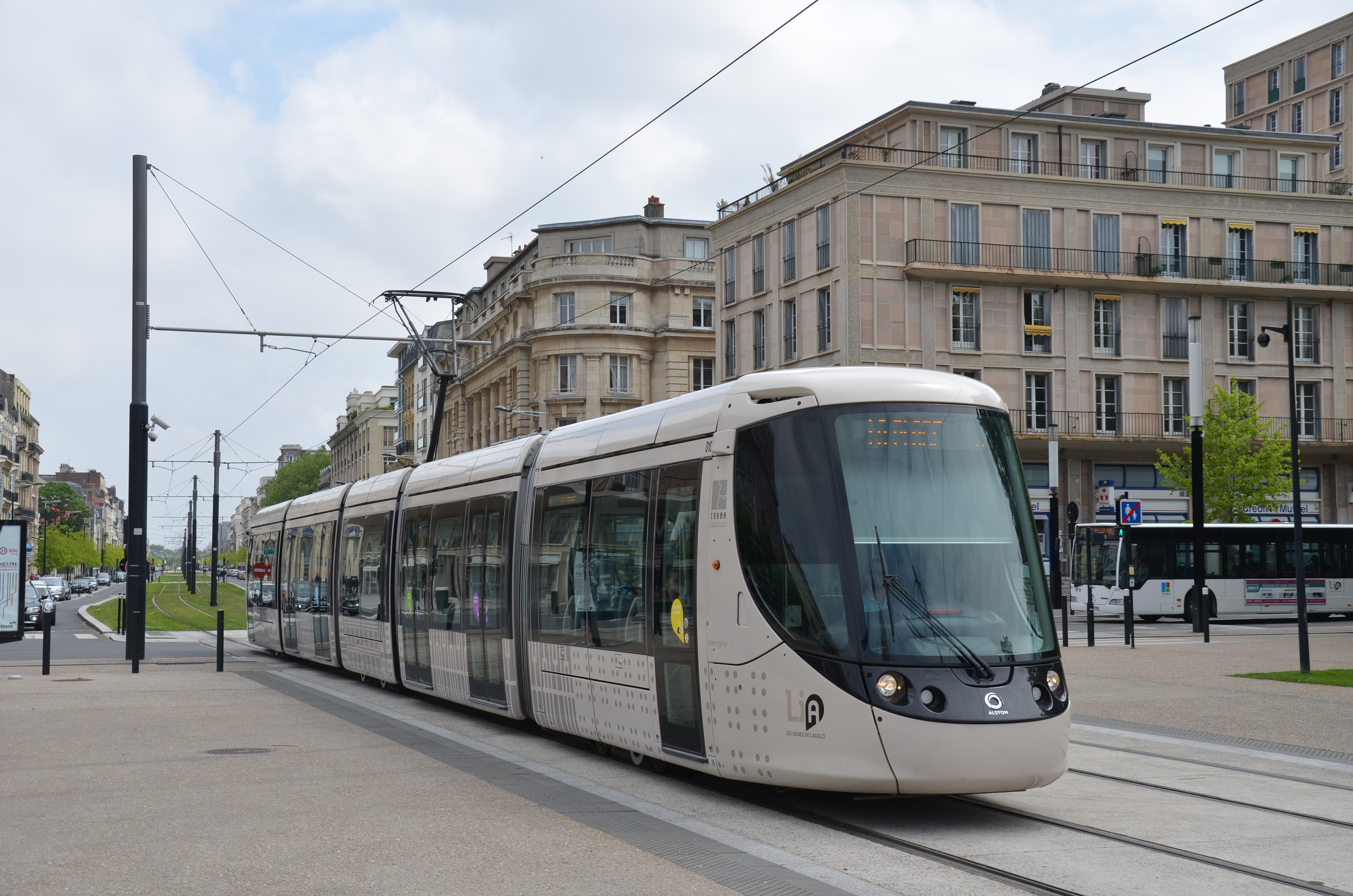
Tramway du Havre Alstom Citadis

The city and the metropolitan area has a dense transport network. This solves the problem of a break between the lower town and the upper town and the two parts of the city are connected by long boulevards, winding roads, many stairs, a funicular and the Jenner tunnel.

The CODAH transport network is called Lia and is operated by the Ocean Port Transport company (CTPO), a subsidiary of Veolia Transport. The overhaul of the bus network in 2008 helped to ensure a better service for all the towns in the metropolitan area. The CTPO operates a bus network consisting of 19 regular urban routes and six evening routes called the "Midnight Bus". The Le Havre urban area is served by 165 vehicles and 41 regular bus routes with an average of 100,000 passengers per day. From January 2011 there has been a regular shuttle service specific to the Industrial Zone and Port of Le Havre, thus adding to the cross-estuary service of VTNI. Since 1890 the funicular has provided a link between the upper town and the lower town in four minutes with a cable car.

Le Havre had a tramway system from 1894 until it closed in 1957. More recently a new tramway system, with 23 stations and 13 km (8 mi) of route, was built, and opened on 12 December 2012. The first part of the line connects the beach to the station climbing to the upper town through a new tunnel near the Jenner tunnel then it splits into two: one link going to Mont-Gaillard, the other to Caucriauville.

Since 2001 Le Havre agglomeration has operated the LER, a TER line connecting the Le Havre station to Rolleville passing through five other SNCF railway stations of the urban area.

From 2005, development work for Segregated cycle facilities have increased including a connection to the Greenway which promises to be an important network of quality. Between 2007 and 2011, the total length of cycle paths has doubled to 46 km (29 mi) in total length. It is possible to rent bicycles through agencies of the Océane bus or from the town hall (Vel-H) which has them on hand. A fleet of 140 taxis work in Le Havre and serve 25 stations.

== Politics and administration ==
Le Havre is one of two sub-prefectures of Seine-Maritime and the second largest subprefecture in France after Reims. It is the capital of the Arrondissement of Le Havre which includes 168 communes. It is also the largest member of the Le Havre Seine Métropole.

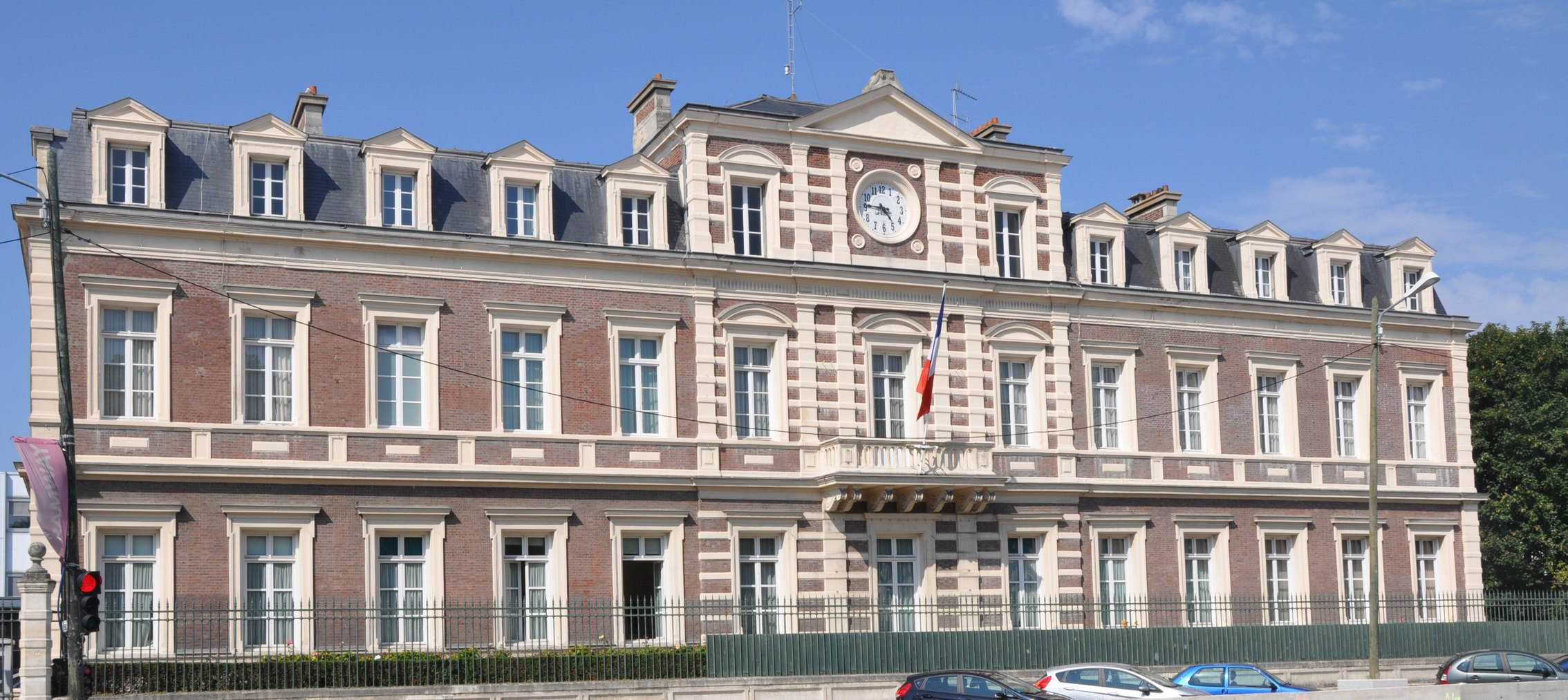
The Sub-préfecture

Since 2015, the city of Le Havre is divided over six Cantons, some of which also cover neighbouring communes. For the parliamentary elections, Le Havre spans two constituencies: the seventh (former cantons I, V, VI, and VII) and the eighth (former cantons II, III, IV, VIII, IX).

=== Political trends and results ===
Several politicians have spent part of their lives in the city: Jules Lecesne (1818–1878), Jules Siegfried (1837–1922), and Félix Faure (1841–1899) were elected as municipal councillors and MPs. A pool, a shopping centre and a street have been named after René Coty from Le Havre, who served as President of the French Republic from 1954 to 1959. Christine Lagarde (born 1956) attended high schools in Le Havre before becoming Minister of the Economy and Director-General of the International Monetary Fund in 2011.

Since 23 October 2010 the mayor has been Édouard Philippe (UMP). He also holds the presidency of the CODAH and has held a seat in the National Assembly for the 7th district of Seine-Maritime since 2012. He succeeded Antoine Rufenacht (UMP), who was mayor of Le Havre for fifteen years before resigning, as the head of the municipality. The city of Le Havre has long been the strongest bastion of the Communist Party of France, who directed it from 1956 to 1995. Overall, the inhabitants of Le Havre in the 7th electoral district (city centre and western neighbourhoods) tend to vote for the right while those of the 8th electoral district (eastern neighbourhoods) tend to choose the candidate of the left. For example, in the presidential election of 2007, the 7th electoral district voted for Nicolas Sarkozy (UMP) by 55.05% against 44.95% for Ségolène Royal (PS) while in the 8th electoral district 55.02% voted for the Socialist candidate. However, the results of the 2012 presidential elections gave the PS wins in both districts with a smaller margin in the 7th (Hollande: 51.71% / Sarkozy: 48.29%) than in the 8th (Hollande 64.21% / Sarkozy: 35.79%).

=== Municipal administration ===
The number of inhabitants in Le Havre is between 150,000 and 199,999 so the number of councillors is 59 members. The mayor, 41 aldermen and 17 deputies form the council of Le Havre elected in 2008. It meets on average once a month at the town hall. The debates are generally public except for certain proceedings.

Le Havre has experienced many territorial extensions by annexing neighbouring communes:

- 1852: Ingouville and parts of Graville-l'Eure and Sanvic
- 1919: all of Graville-Sainte-Honorine
- 1953: Bleville
- 1955: all of Sanvic
- 1971: part of Harfleur (a district of Caucriauville)
- 1973: Rouelles (with the status of associated commune, 3,184 inhabitants in 2006)

=== Mayors ===
Mayors of Le Havre from the French Revolution to 1940
From	To	Mayor	Party	Position
1790	1790	Pierre Duval		
1790	1791	Jean-Jacques Christinat		
1791	1791	Frédéric Heroult		
1791	1793	Jacques-Ambroise Rialle		
1793	1794	Jean-Marc Belot		
1794	1794	François Bayle		
1794	1795	Louis Lemesle		
1795	1797	Jean-Martin Gregoire		
1797	1797	Jacques Ambroise Rialle		
1797	1797	Marie Glier		
1797	1799	Alexandre Lacorne		
1799	1800	Marie Glier		
1800	1800	Pierre Fortin		
1800	1821	Guillaume-Antoine Sery		
1821	1830	André Begouen-Demeaux		
1830	1830	Lahoussaye		
1830	1831	Michel Delaroche		
1831	1848	Adrien Lemaistre		
1848	1849	Jules Ancel		
1849	1849	Alexandre Bertin		
1849	1849	Frédéric Perquer		
1849	1853	Adrien Lemaistre		
1853	1853	Isidore Maire		
1853	1855	Jules Ancel		
1855	1858	Edouard Larue		
1858	1864	Just Viel		
1864	1870	Edouard Larue		
1870	1874	Ulysee Guillemard		
1874	1874	Emmanuel Bigot de la Robillardiere		
1874	1878	Jules Masurier		
1878	1878	Ulysee Guillemard		
1878	1886	Jules Siegfried		
1886	1890	Paul Marion		
1890	1896	Louis Brindeau		
1896	1904	Théodule Marais		
1904	1908	Théodore Maillart		
1908	1914	Henry Genestal		
1914	1919	Pierre-François Morgand		
1919	1940	Léon Meyer		

Mayors from 1940
From	To	Mayor	Party	Position
1940	1941	Jean Risson		
1941	1941	Georges Patrimonio		
1941	1944	Pierre Courant		
1944	1947	Pierre Voisin	PCF	
1947	1947	Albert le Clainche		
1947	1947	Pierre Adolphe Jean Voisin		
1947	1954	Pierre Courant		
1954	1954	Eugène Gas		
1954	1956	Léopold Abadie		
1956	1959	René Cance	PCF	
1959	1965	Robert Monguillon	SFIO	
1965	1971	René Cance	PCF	
1971	1994	André Duromea	PCF	
1994	1995	Daniel Colliard	PCF	
1995	2010	Antoine Rufenacht	RPR, UMP	
2010	2017	Édouard Philippe	UMP, LR	
2017	2019	Luc Lemonnier	LR	
2019	2020	Jean-Baptiste Gastinne	LR	
2020		Édouard Philippe	LR	

=== Public institutions and services ===
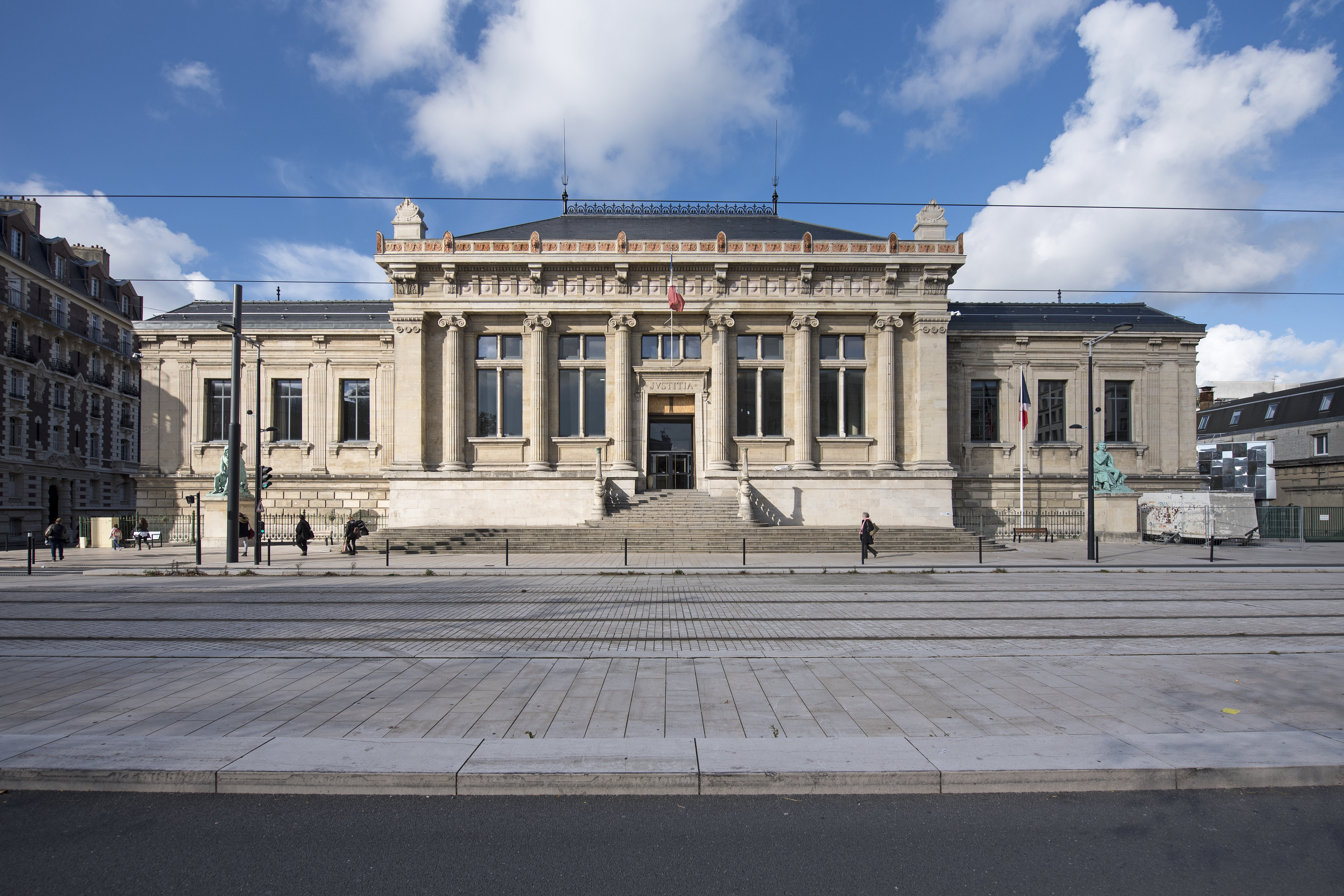
The Palace of Justice

The Le Havre Palace of Justice is located on the Boulevard de Strasbourg. With its annex, it includes a high court, a juvenile court, and a commercial court. The city also has a Labour Court and District Court. Among the legal services offered there are legal aid services and the application of penalties. Le Havre depends on the Court of Appeal of Rouen. The prison, which dates from the Second Empire, was completely destroyed in 2012. The new prison for Le Havre was completed in 2010 at Saint-Aubin-Routot east of the Le Havre agglomeration. It has an area of 32,000 m2 on a site of 15 hectares and can accommodate 690 people.

The Hospital Group of Havre is a public health facility managed by a supervisory board chaired by the Mayor of Le Havre. Its main structures are Flaubert Hospital (the oldest, located downtown), the Monod Hospital (in Montivilliers), the Pierre Janet Hospital (psychiatry), the house for adolescents, day hospitals, and seniors' residences. It is the largest employer in the CODAH. Built in 1987, the Jacques Monod Hospital offers a full range of care in medicine, surgery, gynecology, obstetrics, pediatrics, geriatrics, mental health follow-up care, rehabilitation, reintegration, and public health.

Finally, there are several private clinics that offer complete care: the private clinic of the Estuary groups together the old clinics of Petit Colmoulins and François I. The private clinic of Ormeaux is located in the neighbourhood of Eure.

During the first half of the 20th century, the 129th regiment of infantry of the line was stationed at Le Havre and left an important mark on the city so a street was named after them. The 74th Infantry Regiment of commandos was present from 1963 to 1976. Finally, Le Havre is the godmother city for BPC Mistral. The ceremony was held at the City Hall on 15 November 2009, during a stopover at the Building.

=== National politics ===
For elections to the National Assembly, Le Havre is divided between Seine-Maritime's 7th and 8th constituency. They are currently represented by Agnès Firmin-Le Bodo and Jean-Paul Lecoq.

== Twin towns and sister cities ==
Le Havre is twinned with:

- Dalian, China
- Magdeburg, Germany
- Saint Petersburg, Russia
- Southampton, England, United Kingdom
- Tampa, United States
- Venice, Italy

== Demographics ==
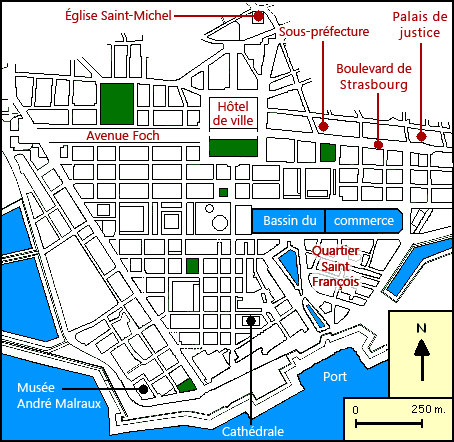
Downtown Le Havre

Le Havre experienced a population boom in the second half of the 19th century. Subsequently, the population drain of the First World War was offset by the annexation of the town of Graville (the city gained 27,215 people between 1911 and 1921). During the Second World War the population decreased significantly (a loss of 57,149 people between 1936 and 1946) because of the exodus and bombings. After the war the commune saw its population increase until 1975. Since then population has decreased again, especially between 1975 and 1982: during these years of industrial crisis the population fell by 18,494 people. The trend continued in the 1980s although at a slower pace. The current policy of the municipality is to build new housing to attract new residents with the goal of exceeding 200,000 inhabitants, a level that was reached in the 1960s. The population of the commune of Le Havre was 191,000 inhabitants in 1999 which placed the city at 12th place among the most populated cities in France and in the first place in Normandy. In 2022 INSEE counted 166,462 people living in the commune of Le Havre, while the urban area of Le Havre had 232,052 inhabitants and the metropolitan area of Le Havre had 335,499 inhabitants.

Historical population

Year	Pop.	±% p.a.
1793	20,620	—
1800	19,000	−1.16%
1806	19,482	+0.42%
1821	20,768	+0.43%
1831	23,816	+1.38%
1836	25,618	+1.47%
1841	27,154	+1.17%
1846	31,325	+2.90%
1851	56,964	+12.70%
1856	64,137	+2.40%
1861	74,336	+3.00%
1866	60,055	−4.18%
1872	85,825	+6.13%
1876	92,068	+1.77%
1881	105,867	+2.83%
1886	112,074	+1.15%
1891	116,369	+0.75%
1896	119,470	+0.53%
1901	130,196	+1.73%

Year	Pop.	±% p.a.
1906	132,430	+0.34%
1911	136,159	+0.56%
1921	163,374	+1.84%
1926	158,022	−0.66%
1931	165,076	+0.88%
1936	164,083	−0.12%
1946	106,934	−4.19%
1954	139,810	+3.41%
1962	185,029	+3.56%
1968	205,236	+1.74%
1975	217,882	+0.86%
1982	199,388	−1.26%
1990	195,854	−0.22%
1999	190,905	−0.28%
2007	179,751	−0.75%
2012	173,142	−0.75%
2017	170,147	−0.35%
2023	166,687	−0.34%

Source: EHESS and INSEE

Between 2012 and 2017, the birth rate was 14.3 per thousand and the mortality rate was 10.4 per thousand: even though the Rate of natural increase is positive it does not compensate for the clearly negative net migration rate (-0.7%). In 2017 19% of Le Havre's population was under 15 years old and 39% were under 30 years old, which was above the average for metropolitan France. 24% of men and 26% of women were over 60 years old. The most populous quarters are the city centre, Sanvic, Caucriauville, Anatole France/Danton and Côte Ouest/Ormeaux. In 2009 the foreign population was estimated at 8,525 persons or 4.8% of the population. 12,148 immigrants lived in Havre, or 6.8% of the urban population. Most had North African (5060) or African (3114) origins.

With the economic changes that have affected the city, the Professions and Socio-professional categories (PCS) have changed dramatically since the 1980s: between 1982 and 1999, the number of workers has declined by about a third (−10,593), their share of the active labour force was 16% in 1982 and 12.5% in 1999. The population of workers is concentrated in the southern suburbs close to the port and the industrial zone. At the same time the numbers of executives and intellectual professions increased by 24.5%, which is explained in part by the creation and development of the University of Le Havre. In 2017 the city had a lower proportion of managers and intellectual occupations than the national average (14.4% against 18.1%). The proportion of workers (22.5%) was higher than the national average (19.9%). Going from 16.7% to 21.7% of the labour force, the rate of unemployment has increased between 2007 and 2017, and it remains higher than in the rest of the country (13.9%). The proportion Le Havre people in short-term employment (CDD and interim work) is higher than the national average. Finally, the proportion of Le Havre people with a degree from higher education dramatically increased from 17.3% in 2007 to 23.2% in 2017 against 29.9% for entire France.

== Economy ==
=== General ===
Although well developed and diversified, the local economy relies heavily on industrial sites, international groups, and subcontracted SMEs. The Le Havre economy is far from decision centres which are located mainly in Paris and major European economic cities. There is therefore a low representation of head offices in the city with the exception of some local economic successes such as the Sidel Group (now a subsidiary of Tetra Pak) – a distributor of interior furniture, and the ship-owner Delmas which was recently acquired by the CMA CGM.

Major employers in the Le Havre area
Name	Commune	Sector
Renault Sandouville	Sandouville	Automotive
Centre Hospitalier Général	Le Havre	Health
Le Havre Commune	Le Havre	Public Administration
TotalEnergies	Gonfreville	Petrochemicals
Port Authority of Le Havre	Le Havre	Port Services
Aircelle	Gonfreville	Aeronautical Construction
Total Petrochemicals	Gonfreville	Petrochemicals
SNCF	Le Havre	Transport
Dresser-Rand	Le Havre	Mechanical Equipment
Chevron	Gonfreville	Petrochemicals

=== Port ===
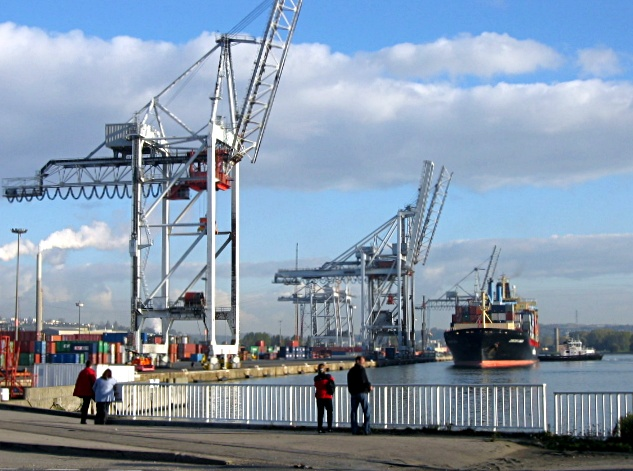
Container Terminal, near the François I lock.

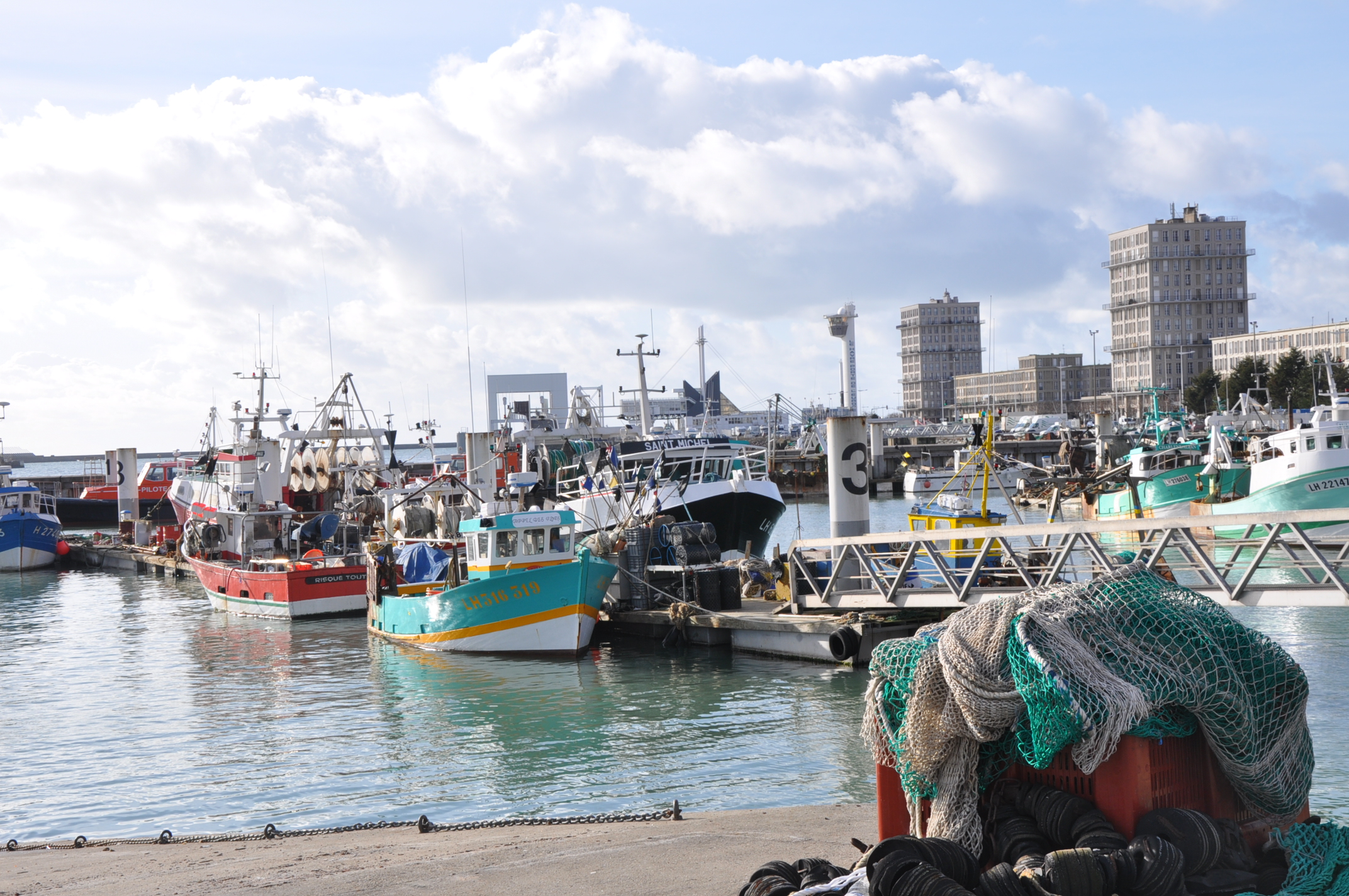
Fishing Port

With 68.6 million tons of cargo in 2011, the port of Le Havre is the second largest French seaport in trade volume behind that of Marseille and 50th largest port in the world. It represents 60% of total French container traffic with nearly 2.2 million Twenty-foot equivalent unit|EVP]s in 2011. At the European level, it is eighth largest for container traffic and sixth largest for total traffic. The Port receives a large number of oil tankers that transported 27.5 million tonnes of crude oil and 11.7 million tonnes of refined product in 2011. Finally, 340,500 vehicles passed through the Roll-on/roll-off terminal in 2010. 75 regular shipping lines serve 500 ports around the world. The largest trading partner of the port of Le Havre is the Asian continent which alone accounts for 58% of imports by container and 39.6% of exports. The rest of the traffic is distributed mainly to Europe and America.

Le Havre occupies the north bank of the estuary of the Seine on the Channel. Its location is favourable for several reasons: it is on the most frequented waterway in the world; it is the first and last port in the North Range of European ports – the largest in Europe which handles a quarter of all global maritime trade. As a deepwater port, it is accessible to all types of ships whatever their size around the clock. At the national level, Le Havre is 200 kilometres (124 mi) west of the most populous and richest region in France: Île-de-France. Since its founding in 1517 on the orders of François I, Le Havre has continued to grow: today it measures 27 km (17 mi) from east to west, about 5 km (3 mi) from north to south with an area of 10,000 hectares (24,711 acres). The last big project called Port 2000 increased the handling capacity for containers.

The port provides 16,000 direct jobs to the Le Havre region, to which must be added indirect jobs in industry and transport. With approximately 3,000 employees in 2006, the activities of distribution and warehousing provide more jobs, followed by road transport (2,420 jobs) and handling (2,319 jobs).

In 2011, 715,279 passengers passed through the port of Le Havre and there were 95 visits by cruise ships carrying 185,000 passengers. The port expects 110 cruise ship calls in 2012. Created in 1934, the leisure boat harbour of Le Havre is located to the west and is the largest French boat harbour in the Channel with a capacity of 1,160 moorings. Finally, there is a small fishing port in the Saint-François district and a Hawker centre.

=== Industry ===
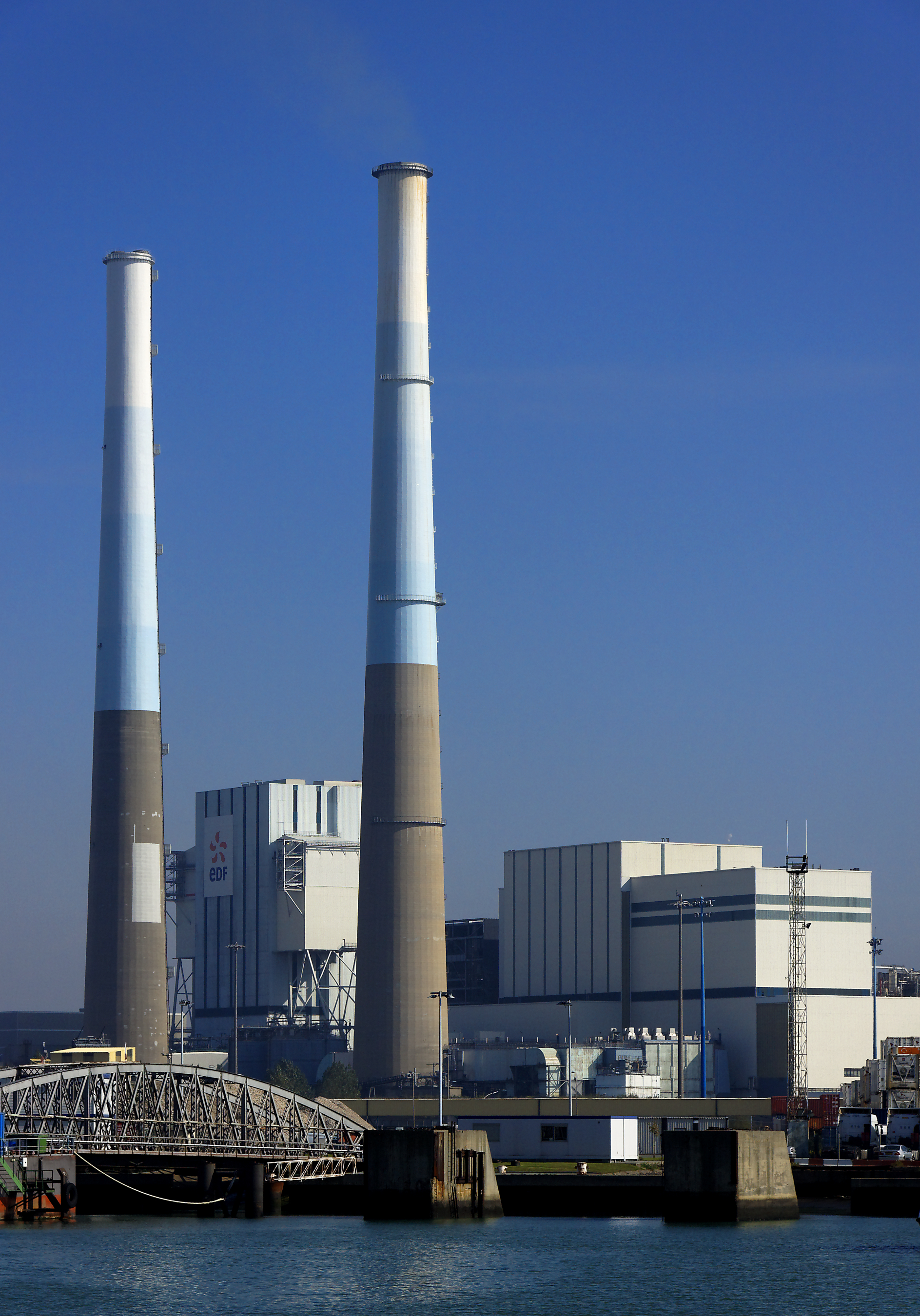
The EDF Thermal power plant of Le Havre.

Most industries are located in the industrial-port area north of the estuary and east of the city of Le Havre. The largest industrial employer (2,400 employees) of the Le Havre region is the Renault public company in the commune of Sandouville. The second important sector for the industrial zone is petrochemicals. The Le Havre region has more than a third of French refining capacity. It provides about 50% of the production of basic plastics and 80% of additives and oils with more than 3,500 researchers working in private and public laboratories. Large firms in the chemical industry are mainly in the communes of Le Havre (Millenium Chemicals Le Havre), Montivilliers (TotalEnergies, Yara, Chevron Oronite SA, Lanxess, etc.) and Sandouville (Goodyear Chemicals Europe). A total of 28 industrial establishments manufacture plastics in the Le Havre area many of which are classed as SECESO.

There are several firms in the aerospace industry: SAFRAN Nacelles, a supplier to Airbus, Boeing and other commercial air-framers, making jet engine nacelles and thrust reversers, is located in Harfleur and employs 1,200 people from the Le Havre area. Finally, Dresser-Rand SA manufactures equipment for the oil and gas industry and employs about 700 people. In the energy field, the EDF thermal power plant of Le Havre has an installed capacity of 1,450MW and operates using coal with 357 employees. The AREVA group announced the opening of a factory for building wind turbines: installed in the port of Le Havre, it should create some 1,800 jobs. The machines are designed for Offshore wind power in Brittany, the UK, and Normandy.

Other industries are dispersed throughout the Le Havre agglomeration: the Brûlerie du Havre, which belongs to Legal-Legoût, located in the district of Dollemard that roasts coffee, Sidel located both in the industrial area of Port of Le Havre and Octeville-sur-Mer designs and manufactures blow moulding machines and complete filling line machines for plastic bottles.

=== Services sector ===
The two largest employers in the service sector are the Groupe Hospitalier du Havre with 4,384 staff and the City of Le Havre with 3,467 permanent employees. The city has long been home to many service companies whose activity is related to port operations: primarily the ship-owning companies and also the marine insurance companies. The headquarters of Delmas (transport and communications, 1,200 employees) and SPB (Provident Society Banking, insurance, 500 employees) have settled recently at the entrance to the city. The head office of Groupama Transport (300 employees) is also present.

The transport sector is the largest economic sector in Le Havre with 15.5% of employment. Logistics occupies a large part of the population and the ISEL trains engineers in this field. Since September 2007 the ICC has welcomed local students in their first year in the relocated Europe-Asia campus of the Institute of Political Studies of Paris. Higher Education is represented by the University of Le Havre which employs 399 permanent professors and 850 lecturers as well as by engineering companies like Auxitec and SERO.

There are many growth factors in the tourist industry: blue flag rating, World Heritage status from UNESCO, the label French Towns and Lands of Art and History, cruise ship development, a policy of value-creation from heritage, and the City of the Sea project. In January 2020 the city had 26 hotels with a total of 1,428 rooms.

Le Havre is the seat of the Chamber of Commerce and Industry of Le Havre. It manages the Le Havre Octeville Airport.

== Culture ==
=== Events and festivals ===
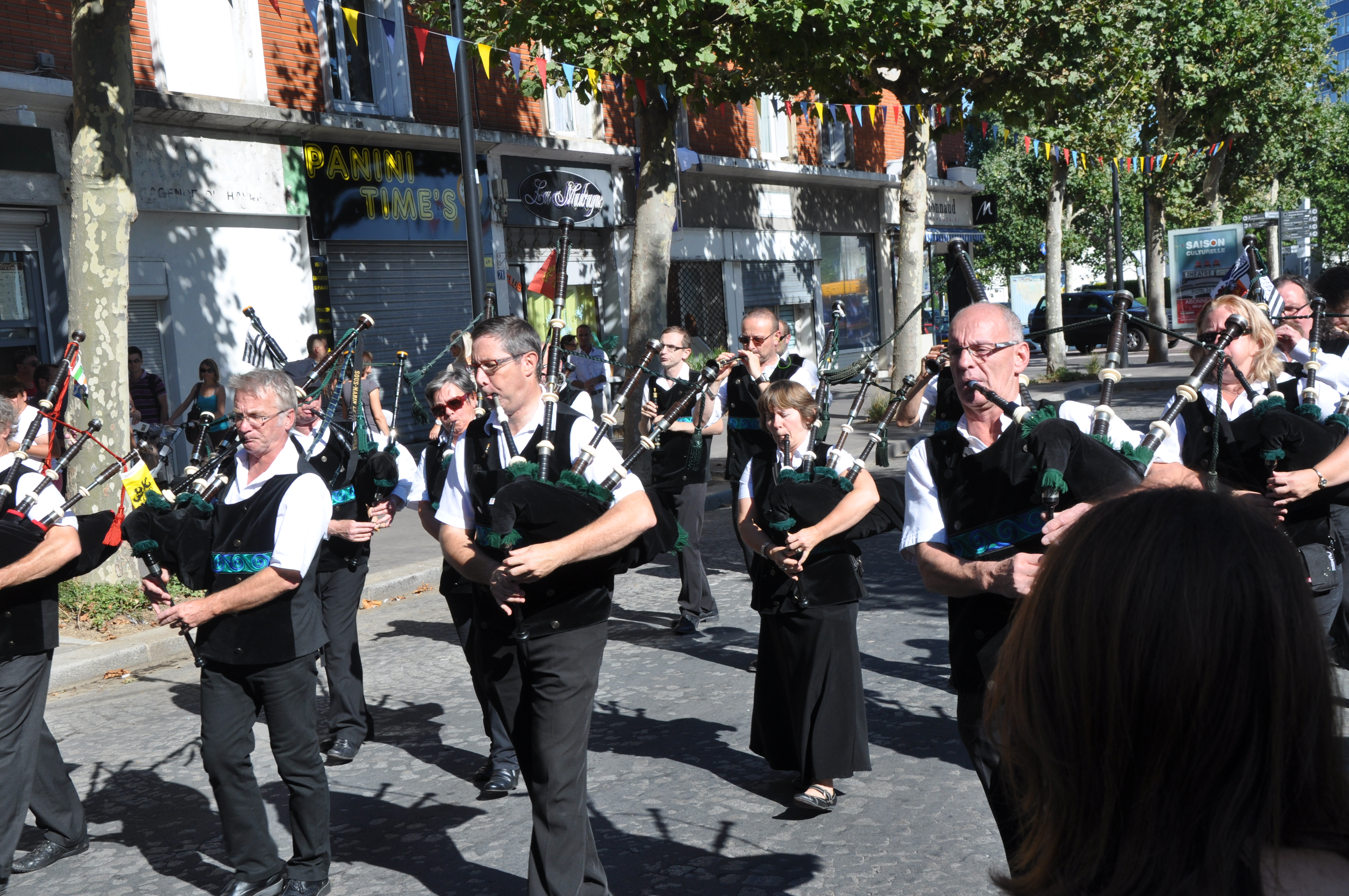
Breton Festival in the Saint-François district

Le Havre's festival calendar is punctuated by a wide range of events.

In spring a Children's Book Festival was recently created. In May there is the Fest Yves, a Breton festival in the Saint-François district. On the beach of Le Havre and Sainte-Adresse there is a jazz festival called Dixie Days in June. In July, detective novels are featured in the Polar room at the Beach hosted by The Black Anchors. Between the latter also in the context of Z'Estivales is an event offering many shows of street art throughout the summer supplemented by the festival of world music MoZaïques at the fort of Sainte-Adresse in August since 2010. In mid-August there is a Flower parade which passes through the streets of the central city.

In the first weekend of September the marine element is highlighted in the Festival of the Sea. This is a race between Le Havre and Bahia in Brazil. Also every November there is a fair held in the Docks Café. The Autumn Festival in Normandy, organized by the departments of Seine-Maritime and Eure, and the Region of Normandy, runs from September to November and offers numerous concerts throughout the region as well as theatre performances and dance. In late October, since 2009, there is rock music festival which has been at the fort of Tourneville since the moving of the Papa's Production association site there. The West Park Festival, after its inauguration in 2004, has been held in the park of the town hall of Harfleur.

Since 1 June 2006 a Biennale of contemporary Art has been organized by the group Partouche.

=== Cultural heritage and architecture ===
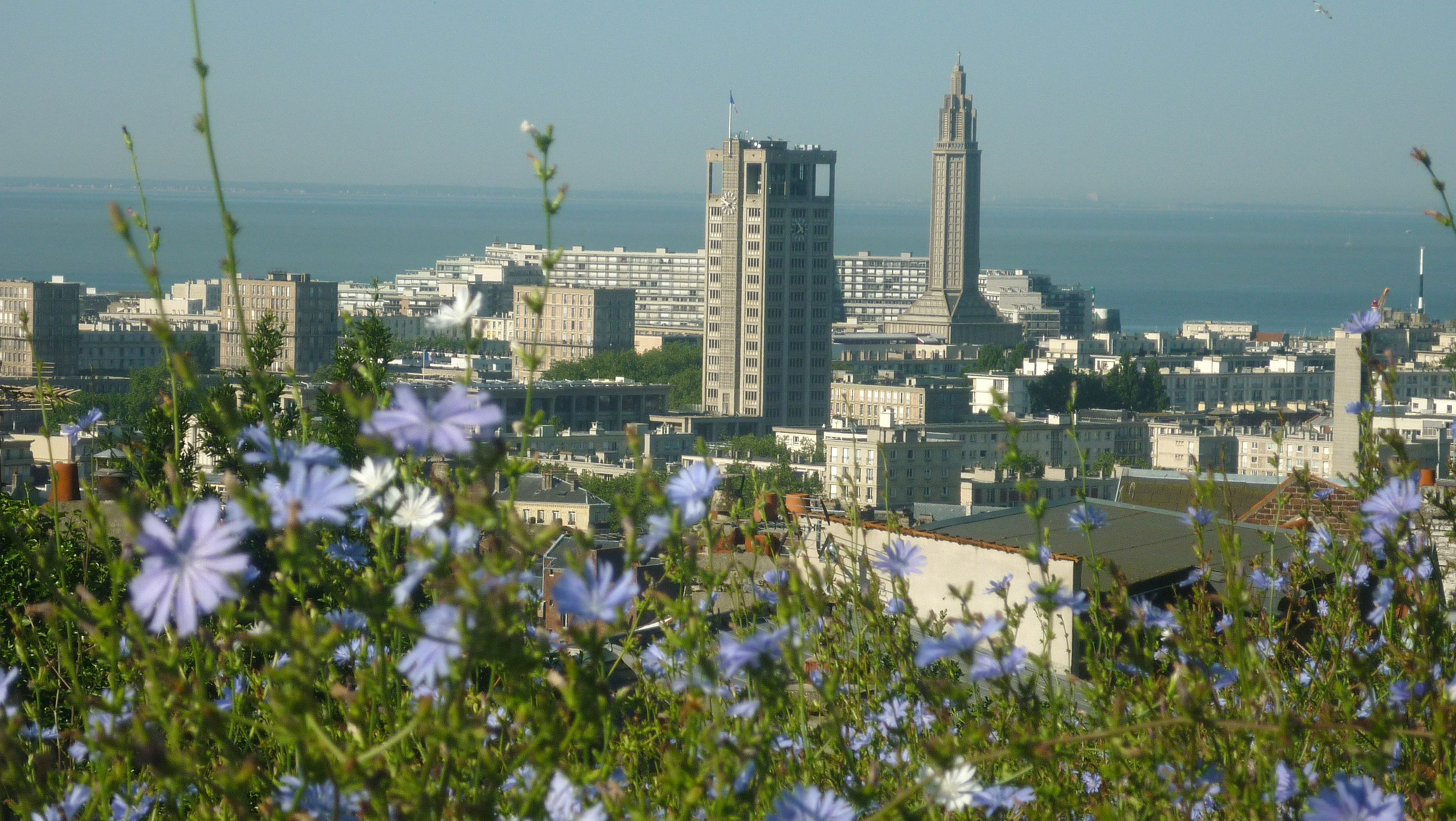
View of the rebuilt central city: the belfry of the town hall and the bell tower of the Church of Saint-Joseph du Havre.

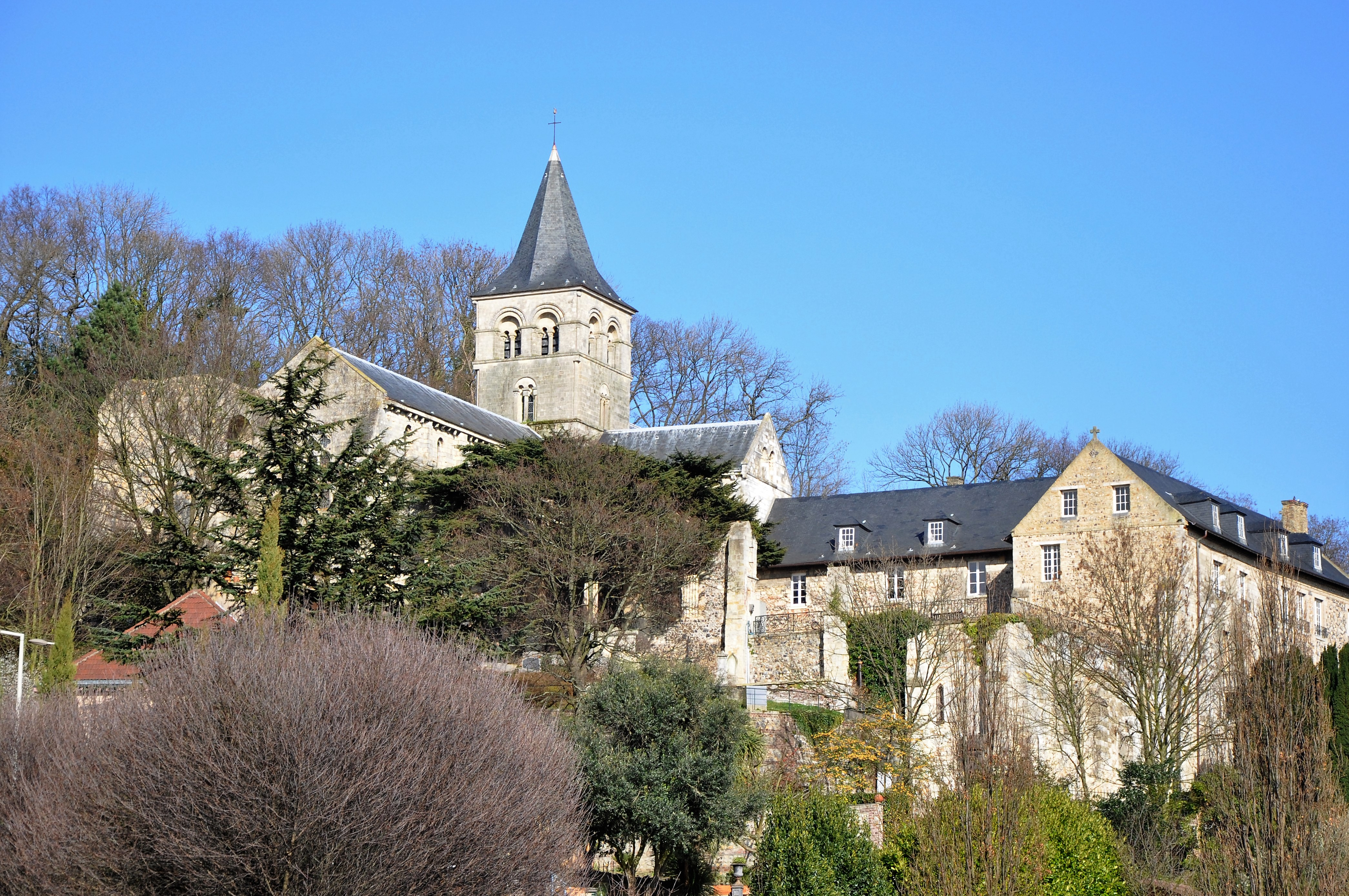
Graville Abbey

Many buildings in the city are classified as "historical monuments", but the 2000s marked the real recognition of Le Havre's architectural heritage. The city received the label "City of Art and History" in 2001, then in 2005 UNESCO inscribed the city of Le Havre as a World Heritage Site.

The oldest building still standing in Le Havre is the Graville Abbey. The other medieval building in the city is the Chapel of Saint-Michel of Ingouville. Because of the bombing in 1944, heritage from the modern era is rare: Le Havre Cathedral, the Church of Saint Francis, the Museum of the Hotel Dubocage of Bleville, the House of the ship-owner and the old palace of justice (now the Natural History Museum) are concentrated in the Notre-Dame and Saint-François areas. The buildings of the 19th century testify to the maritime and military vocations of the city: the Hanging Gardens, the Fort of Tourneville, Vauban docks, and the Maritime Villa. The heritage of the 1950s and 1960s which were the work of the Auguste Perret workshop forms the most coherent architecture: the Church of Saint Francis and the Town Hall are the centrepieces. The all curved architecture of the "Volcano", designed by Oscar Niemeyer, contrasts with that of the rebuilt centre. Finally, the reconstruction of many districts is a showcase for the architecture of the 21st century. Among the achievements by renowned architects are the Chamber of Commerce and Industry (René and Phine Weeke Dottelond), Les Bains Des Docks (Jean Nouvel). °

=== Churches ===
- Le Havre Cathedral: the first stone of the building was laid in 1536. It is the seat of the Bishop of Le Havre.
- Church of Saint Joseph, one of the most recognized symbols of the city. The belltower is one of the tallest in France, rising to a height of 107 metres. It was designed by Auguste Perret.
- Church of Saint Michel
- Church of Saint Vincent
- Church of Saint François
- Church of St. Anne
- Church of Saint Marie
- Chapel of Saint Michel d'Ingouville (15th century)
- Graville Abbey, a monastery dedicated to Sainte Honorine, set in grounds on the northern bank of the Seine River.
- Presbyterian Reform Church (Église Réformée), 47 rue Anatole France, built in 1857, bombed in 1941, the roof and ceiling were rebuilt in 1953 by two architects from the famous Auguste Perret office: Jacques Lamy and Gérard Dupasquier, The only building in town offering both ancient and the new Perret school of architecture in the same building. Holy Office each Sunday morning at 10.30.

=== Museums ===
Five Museums in Le Havre have the distinction of being classified as Musées de France (Museums of France) an official label granted only to museums of a high status. The five museums are:

==== Museum of modern art André Malraux – MuMa ====
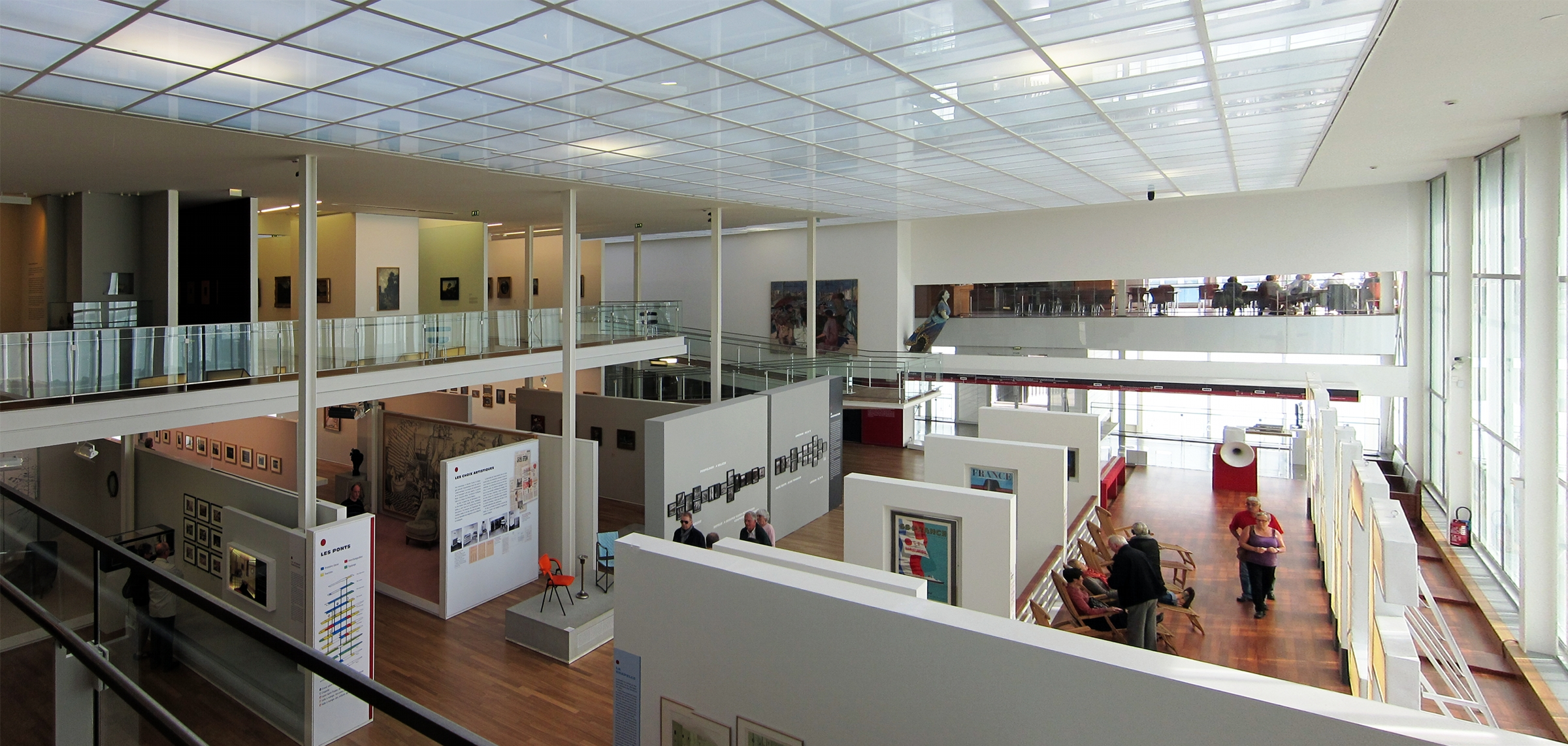
Overview of the Museum of modern art André Malraux - MuMa

The most important of the five, Museum Malraux was built in 1955 by the Atelier LWD and was opened in 1961 by André Malraux. This museum houses a collection of art from the late Middle Ages until the 20th century. The impressionist paintings collections are the second most extensive in France after those of the Orsay Museum in Paris. The museum houses some paintings of Claude Monet, Auguste Renoir, Raoul Dufy, Edgar Degas.

==== Musée du Vieux Havre (Museum of old Le Havre) ====
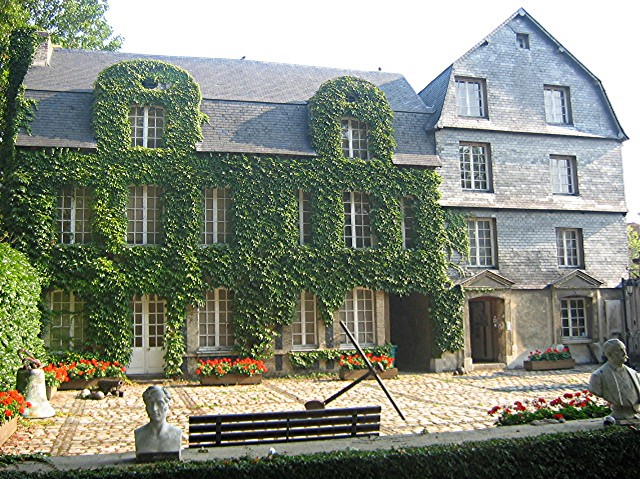
An old house in Le Havre, now Musée du Vieux Havre

A Museum dedicated to the history of Le Havre with many objects from the Ancien Régime and the 19th century: furniture, old maps, statues, and paintings.

==== Musée d'histoire naturelle (Museum of Natural History) ====
Founded in 1881 but heavily damaged during World War II, the Museum of Natural History is housed in Le Havre's former law courts, built in the mid-18th century; the façade and monumental staircase are listed as historical monuments. The museum houses mineralogy, zoology, ornithology, palaeontology and prehistory departments as well as 8,000 early 19th-century paintings from the collection of local naturalist and traveller Charles-Alexandre Lesueur (1778–1846). The museum was destroyed during Allied bombings on 5 September 1944. The library was lost, along with its collections of photographs, scientific instruments and archives. The mineral and geological collections were all destroyed, including a rare collection of local mineral specimens of Normandy. The destruction of the museum was so intense, that all the catalogues, lists of donations, lists of purchases and other archives prevented even a precise inventory of all that was lost."

==== The Shipowner's house ====
From the 18th century; like the Museum of Old Havre it is dedicated to the History of Le Havre and contains many relics from the Ancien Régime as well as furniture, old maps, statues, and paintings.

==== Museum of the Priory of Graville ====
The Museum at the Priory of Graville displays many items of religious art including statues, madonnas, and other religious objects many of which are classified by the Ministry of Culture. It also houses the Gosselin collection of 206 model houses created by Jules Gosselin in the 19th century.

==== Others ====
Other less important museums reflect the history of Le Havre and its maritime vocation. The apartment-control (Apartement-Temoine) was a standard apartment designed by in 1947–1950 and shows a place of daily life in the 1950s. The maritime museum displays objects related to the sea and the port. Finally, there are numerous exhibitions in the city such as the SPOT, a centre for contemporary art, art galleries, and Le Portique – a contemporary art space opened in 2008; the municipal library of Le Havre regularly organizes exhibitions.

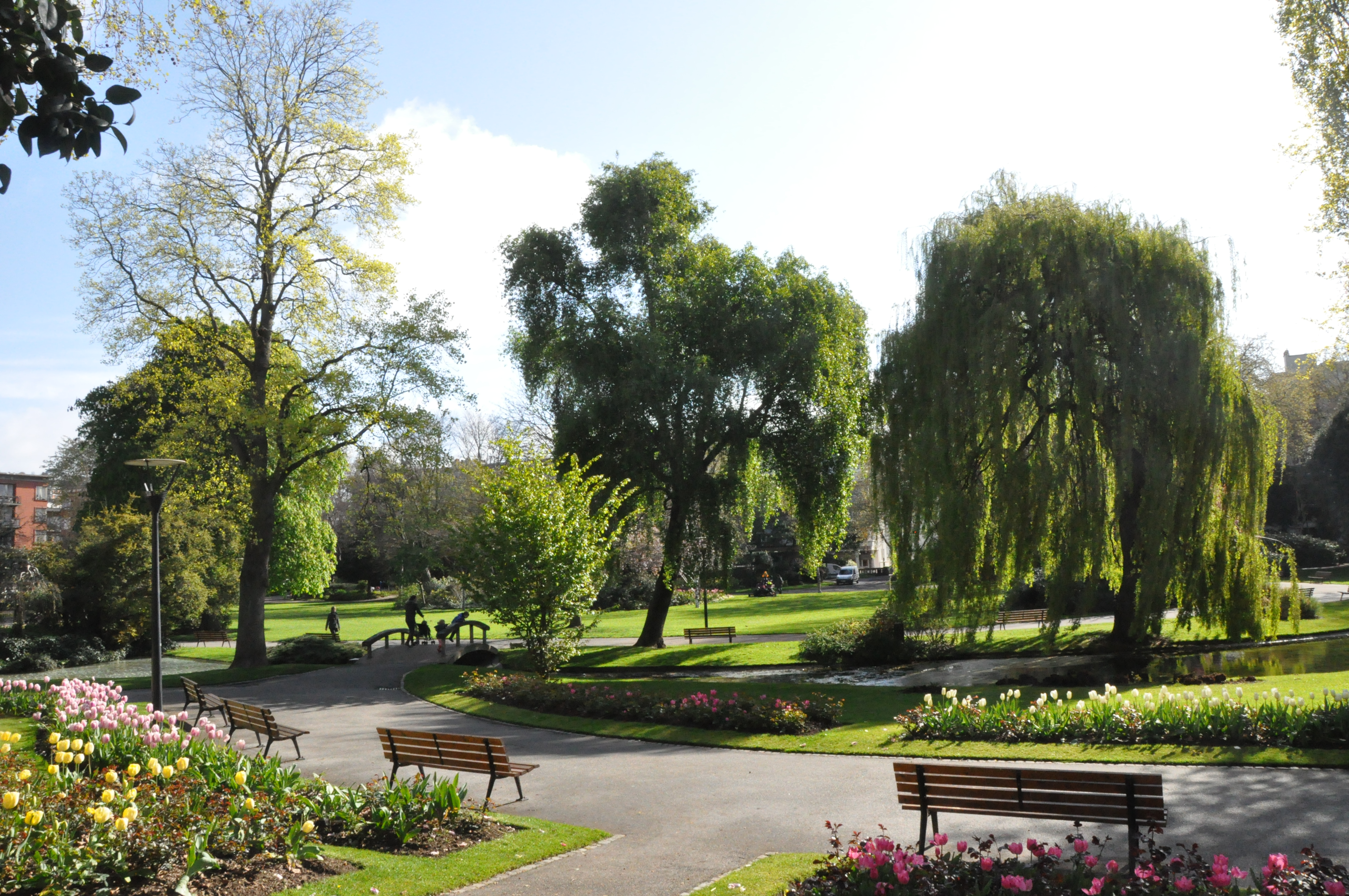
Saint Roch Square

Other attractions include:

- The former tribunal (18th century)
- The Town Hall: the modern belfry which now contains offices
- The "Volcan" cultural centre built by Oscar Niemeyer
- Square St. Roch
- Japanese Garden

=== Theatres, auditoriums and concerts ===
There are two main cultural axes in Le Havre: the central city and the Eure district. The Espace Oscar Niemeyer consists of a part of the "Great Volcano", a national theatre seating 1,093 (which houses the National Choreographic Centre of Le Havre Haute-Normandie directed by Hervé Robbe) and secondly the "Little Volcano" with a 250-seat multi-purpose hall for live performances. The whole Espace Oscar Niemeyer has been worked on since 2011: the little volcano will be transformed into a multimedia library. As for the performances at the Great Volcano, they are now taking place in the old ferry terminal until the end of construction. Other cultural institutions of the city centre are being transformed: the cinema of art and a trial of Le Sirius facing the university will reopen in 2013. Le Tetris at the fort of Tourneville will, in 2013, be a place devoted to contemporary music. Other cultural venues are scattered in the city centre: the cinema Le Studio, the theatre of the City Hall (700 seats), the Little Theatre (450 seats), the Théâtre des Bains Douches (94 seats), Akté theatre (60 seats), and the Poulailler (Henhouse)) (associative theatre with 50 seats) host numerous shows each year. The National Choreographic Centre of Le Havre Haute-Normandie specialises in the creation and production of dance shows. Other shows and performances are given in other places and at the Conservatory Arthur Honegger.

The second cultural centre of the city is in the Eure district near the Basin Vauban. Docks Océane is a multi-purpose hall (concerts, shows, and sporting events) which can accommodate up to 4,700 spectators in 1,800 square metres (19,000 sq ft). The largest cinema in Le Havre is located on the Docks Vauban (2,430 seats). The Docks Café is an exhibition centre of 17,500 square metres (188,000 sq ft) used for shows, fairs, and exhibitions. The Magic Mirrors offers many concerts managed by the city and leased to private organizers.

Following the closure of Cabaret Electric which was located in the Espace Oscar Niemeyer in 2011 a new auditorium, Le Tetris, is under construction at the Fort of Tourneville. It was scheduled to open in September 2013 with a large festival free-of-charge. It will consist of two halls with 800 and 200 seats, exhibition space, housing for artists in residence, a restaurant etc. Le Tetris will be a venue for contemporary music as well as theatre, dance, and visual arts. An "expectation" outside the walls was held on the site of the fort during 2012 and early 2013.

=== Libraries and archives ===
The main library is located in the city centre, named after the writer Armand Salacrou. It has branches in all districts. A new multimedia library at the "Volcano" is being refurbished for 2014. Thousands of references are available in specialized libraries in the Higher School of Art, the Museum of André Malraux, and the Natural History Museum. Medieval manuscripts and Incunables are conserved at the public library. The archives of the city, at the Fort of Tourneville, possesses documents from the 16th to the 20th centuries.

=== Representations in visual arts ===
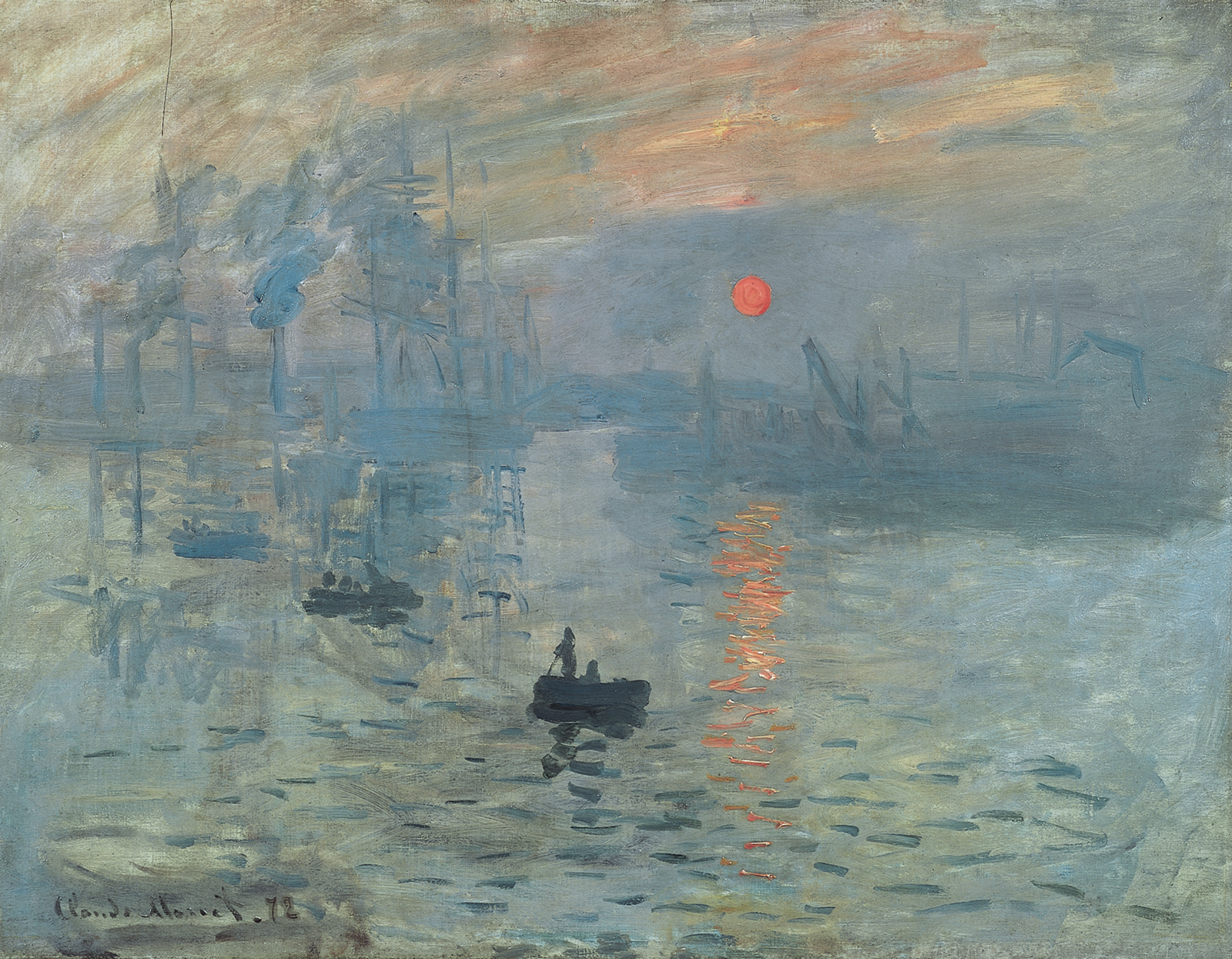
Claude Monet, Impression, Sunrise, 1872, painted in the Port of Le Havre.

The Port of Le Havre and the light on the estuary of the Seine inspired many painters: Louis-Philippe Crepin (1772–1851), Jean-Baptiste Corot (1796–1875), Eugène Isabey (1803–1886), Theodore Gudin (1802–1880), Adolphe-Felix Cals (1810–1880), Jean-François Millet (1814–1875) in 1845, Gustave Courbet (1819–1877) etc.. It is to Eugène Boudin (1824–1898) who created many representations of Le Havre in the 19th century. The artist lived for a time in the city. Thanks to its proximity to Honfleur, Le Havre was also represented by foreign artists such as William Turner, Johan Barthold Jongkind, Alfred Stevens, and Richard Parkes Bonington.

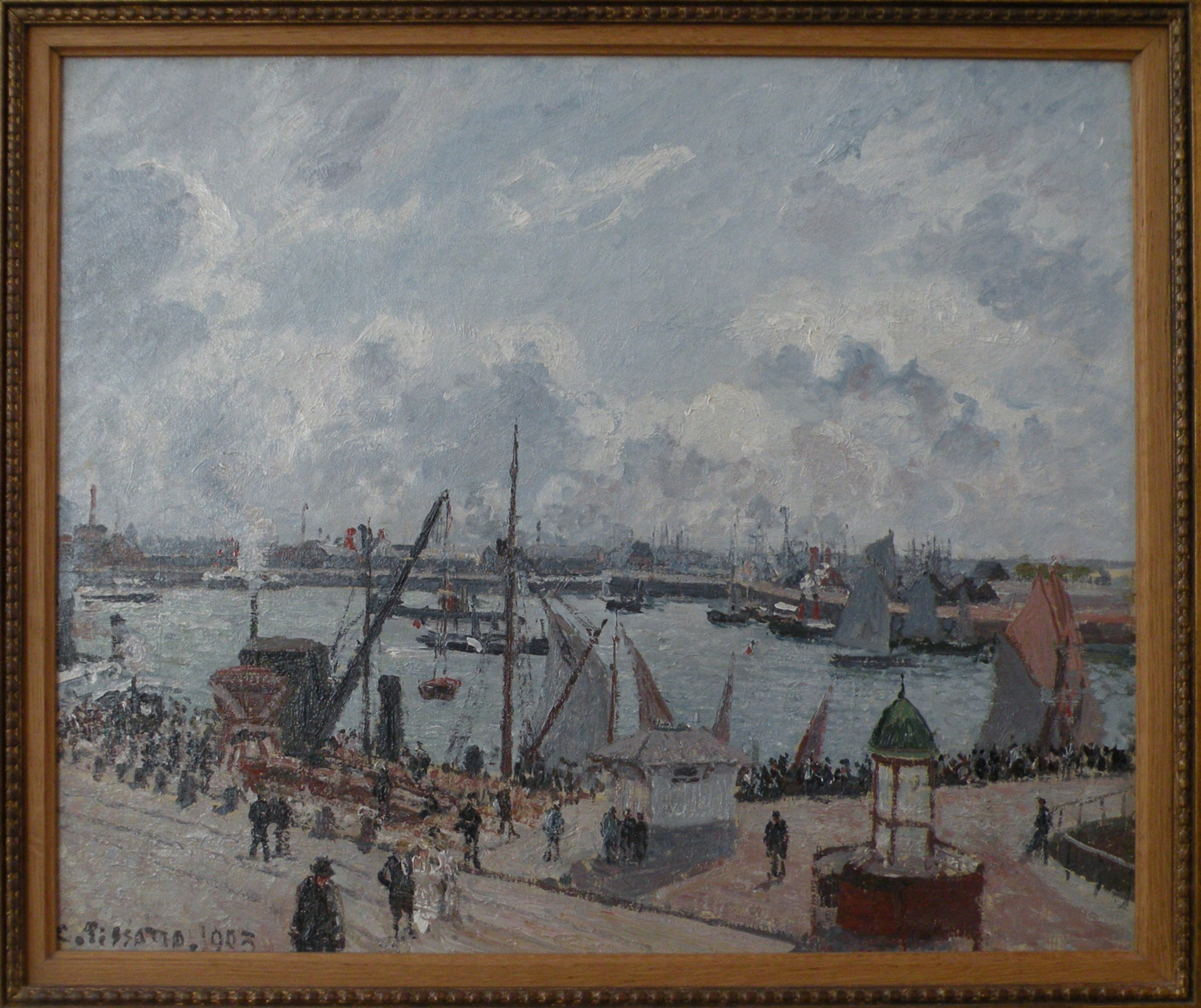
Camille Pissarro, The Outer Harbour of Le Havre, Morning, Sun, Tide, 1902, Museum of modern art André Malraux - MuMa

Claude Monet (1840–1926), a resident of Le Havre from the age of five, in 1872 painted Impression soleil levant (Impression, Sunrise), a painting that gave its name to the impressionist movement. In 1867–1868, he painted many seascapes in the Le Havre region (Terrasse à Sainte-Adresse (Garden at Sainte-Adresse), 1867 Bateaux quittant le port (Boats Leaving the Port), 1874). The Musée Malraux houses some of his paintings : Waterlilies, London Parliament et Winter Sun at Lavacourt. Two other Impressionists, Camille Pissarro (1830–1903) and Maxime Maufra (1861–1918) also represented the port of Le Havre which also inspired Paul Signac (1863–1935), Albert Marquet (1875–1947), and Maurice de Vlaminck (1876–1958).

Then came the school of Fauvism in which many artists did their training at Le Havre: Othon Friesz (1879–1949), Henri de Saint-Delis (1876–1958), Raoul Dufy (1877–1953), Georges Braque (1882–1963), Raymond Lecourt (1882–1946), Albert Copieux (1885–1956), who followed the course of the School of Fine Arts of Le Havre in the time of Charles Lhuillier. They left a number of paintings on the theme of the city and the port. In 1899, Henri de Toulouse-Lautrec (1864–1901) painted La serveuse anglaise du Star (The English waitress of Star) (Museum Toulouse-Lautrec, Albi) of a girl he met in a bar in the city.

Other painters who painted Le Havre and/or its surroundings such as Sainte-Adresse can be cited in particular: Frédéric Bazille, John Gendall, Thomas Couture, Ambroise Louis Garneray, Pablo Picasso (Souvenir du Havre). Jean Dubuffet studied at the School of Art in Le Havre.

=== Cinema ===
With nearly 70 films, Le Havre is one of the provincial cities most represented in the cinema. Several directors have chosen the port facilities as part of their movie:

- L'Atalante by Jean Vigo (1934)
- Le Quai des brumes by Marcel Carné (1938)
- Un homme marche dans la ville by Marcello Pagliero took place in the port and the Saint-François district after the Second World War.
- Ce qu'ils imaginent by Anne Théron (2004)

The city has also hosted the filming of several comedies such as:

- Le Cerveau by Gérard Oury (1968)
- La Beuze (2003)
- Disco (2008)
- La Fée, also presented at the Directors' Fortnight in 2011.

The film by Sophie Marceau, La Disparue de Deauville, made in 2007, contains many scenes around the port of Le Havre, in the Coty shopping centre of Coty and in the streets of the central city.

The film Le Havre by Aki Kaurismäki received two prizes at the 2011 Cannes Film Festival and also the Louis Delluc Prize. It was nominated three times for the 37th César Awards.

=== Literature ===
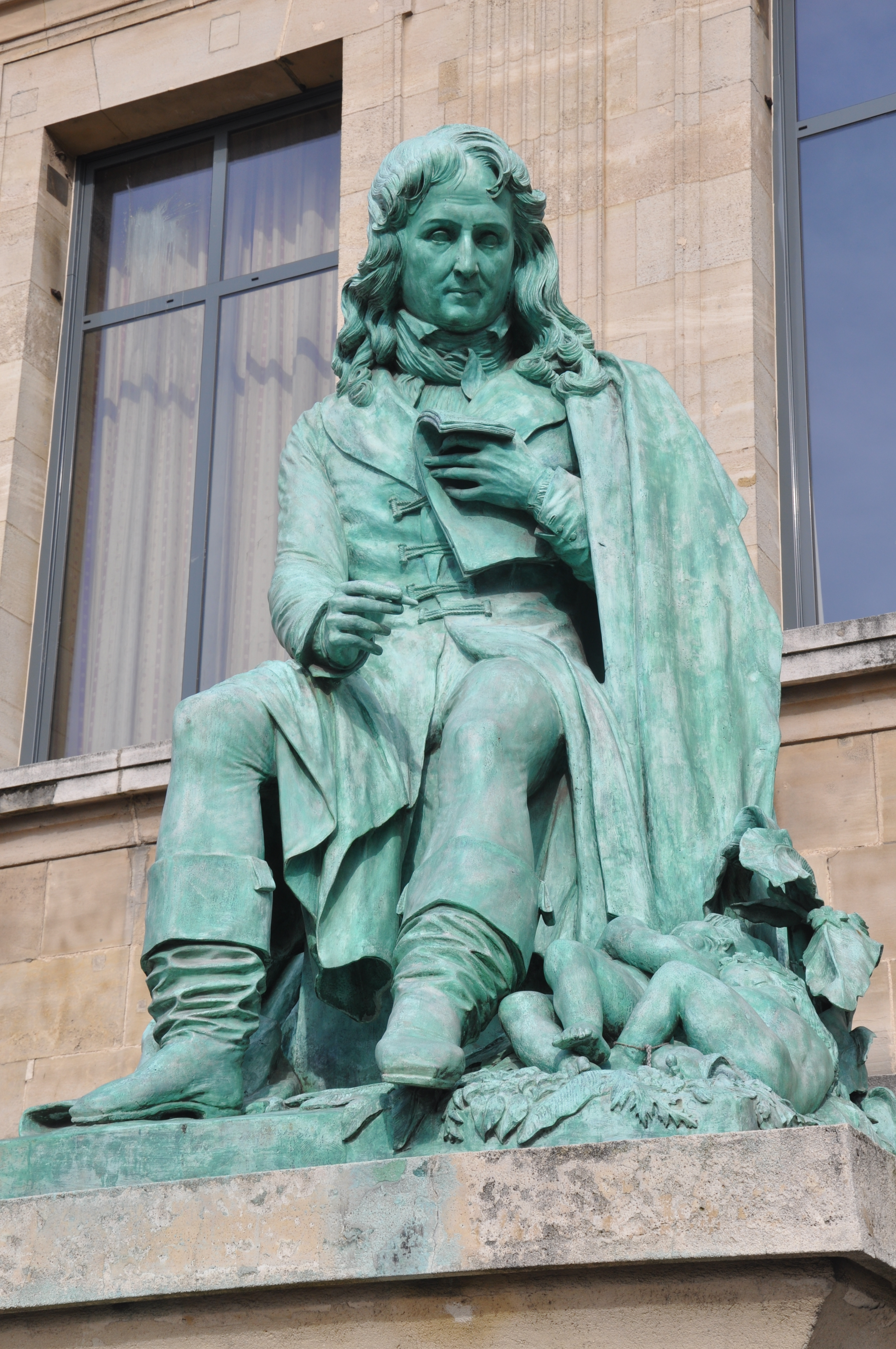
Statue of the writer Bernardin de Saint-Pierre in front of the Law Courts in Le Havre.

Le Havre appears in several literary works as a point of departure to America: in the 18th century, Father Prevost embarked Manon Lescaut and Des Grieux for French Louisiana. Fanny Loviot departed from Le Havre in 1852, as an emigrant to San Francisco and points further west, and recounted her adventures in Les pirates chinois (A Lady's Captivity among Chinese Pirates in the Chinese Seas, 1858).

In the 19th century, Le Havre was the setting for several French novels: Honoré de Balzac described the failure of a Le Havre merchant family in Modeste Mignon. Later, the Norman writer Guy de Maupassant located several of his works at Le Havre such as Au muséum d'histoire naturelle (At the Museum of Natural History) a text published in Le Gaulois on 23 March 1881 and again in Pierre et Jean. Alphonse Allais located his intrigues at Le Havre too. La Bête humaine (The Human Beast) by Émile Zola evokes the world of the railway and runs along the Paris–Le Havre railway. Streets, buildings, and public places in Le Havre pay tribute to other famous Le Havre people from this period: the writer Casimir Delavigne (1793–1843) has a street named after him and a statue in front of the palace of justice alongside another man of letters, Bernardin de Saint-Pierre (1737–1814).

In the 20th century, Henry Miller located part of the action in Le Havre in his masterpiece Tropic of Cancer, published in 1934. Bouville was the commune where the writer lived who wrote his diary in La Nausée (The Nausea) (1938) by Jean-Paul Sartre who was inspired by Le Havre city where he wrote his first novel. There are also the testimonies of Raymond Queneau (1903–1976), born in Le Havre, the city served as a framework for his novel Un rude hiver (A harsh winter) (1939). The plot of Une maison soufflée aux vents (A house blown to the winds) by Émile Danoën, winner of the Popular Novel Prize in 1951, and its sequel Idylle dans un quartier muré (Idyll in a walled neighbourhood) were located in Le Havre during the Second World War. Under the name Port de Brume Le Havre is the setting for three other novels by this author: Cerfs-volants (Kites), L'Aventure de Noël (The Adventure at Christmas), and La Queue à la pègre (Queue to the underworld). Michel Leiris wrote De la littérature considérée comme une tauromachie (Of literature considered like a bullfight) in December 1945.

Diana Gabaldon set the second novel in her Outlander series, Dragonfly in Amber (1992), partly in Le Havre.

Two mystery novels take place in Le Havre: Le Bilan Maletras (The Maletras Balance) by Georges Simenon and Le Crime de Rouletabille (Crime at the Roulette table) by Gaston Leroux. In Rouge Brésil (Red Brazil), winner of the Goncourt Prize in 2001, Jean-Christophe Rufin describes Le Havre in the 16th century as the port of departure of French expeditions to the New World: the hero Villegagnon leaves of the port to conquer new lands for the French crown which become Brazil. Martine–Marie Muller tells the saga of a clan of Stevedores from Le Havre in the 1950s to the 1970s in Quai des Amériques (Quay of the Americas).

Benoît Duteurtre published in 2001, Le Voyage en France (Travel in France), for which he received the Prix Médicis: the main character, a young American impassioned by France, lands at Le Havre which he describes in the first part of the novel. In 2008, Benoît Duteurtre publishes Les pieds dans l'eau (Feet in the water), a highly autobiographical book in which he describes his youth spent between Le Havre and Étretat. The city hosted writers such as Emile Danoën (1920–1999) who grew up in the district of Saint-François, Yoland Simon (born 1941), and Philippe Huet (born 1955). Canadian poet Octave Crémazie (1827–1879) died at Le Havre and was buried in Saint Marie Cemetery. The playwright Jacques-François Ancelot (1794–1854) was also a native of Le Havre. Two famous historians, Gabriel Monod (1844–1912) and André Siegfried (1875–1959) were from the city.

Le Havre also appears in comic books: for example, in L'Oreille cassée (The Broken Ear) (1937), Tintin embarks on the vessel City of Lyon sailing to South America. The meeting between Tintin and General Alcazar in Les Sept Boules de cristal (The Seven Crystal Balls) (1948) is in Le Havre, according to notes by Hergé in the margins of Le Soir, the first publisher of this adventure. The first adventure of Ric Hochet (1963), the designer Tibet and André-Paul Duchâteau, Traquenard au Havre (Trap at Le Havre) shows the seaside and the port. Similarly, in 1967, for the album Rapt sur le France (Rapt on France), the hero passes by the ocean port. Frank Le Gall, in Novembre toute l'année (November all year) (2000) embarks Theodore Poussin at Le Havre on the Cap Padaran.

=== Music ===
Le Havre is the birthplace of many musicians and composers such as Henri Woollett (1864–1936), André Caplet (1878–1925) and Arthur Honegger (1892–1955). There was also Victor Mustel (1815–1890) who was famous for having perfected the harmonium.

Le Havre has long been regarded as one of the cradles of French rock and blues. In the 1980s many groups have emerged after a first dynamic development in the 1960s and 1970s. The most famous personality of Le Havre rock is Little Bob who began his career in the 1970s. The port tradition in many of the groups was repeated in the unused sheds of the port, such as Bovis hall which could hold 20,000 spectators. A blues festival, driven by Jean-François Skrobek, Blues a Gogo existed for eight years from 1995 to 2002. Several artists have been produced such as: Youssou N'Dour, Popa Chubby, Amadou & Mariam, Patrick Verbeke etc. It was organized by the Coup de Bleu association whose former president was head of music Café L'Agora in the Niemeyer Centre which produced the new Le Havre scene. During these same years, the Festival of the Future, the local version of the Fête de l'Humanité (Festival of Humanity), attracted a large audience.

Currently, the musical tradition continues in the Symphony Orchestra of the city of Le Havre, the orchestra of Concerts André Caplet, the conservatory, and music schools such as the Centre for Vocal and Musical Expression (rock) or the JUPO (mainly jazz), associations or labels like Papa's Production (la Folie Ordinaire, Mob's et Travaux, Dominique Comont, Souinq, Your Happy End etc.). The organization by the association of West Park Festival since the 2000s in Harfleur and since 2004 at the Fort of Tourneville is a demonstration. Moreover, since 2008, the association I Love LH was started and promotes Le Havre culture and especially its music scene by organizing original cultural events as well as the free distribution of compilation music by local artists.

=== Board game ===
Main articles: Le Havre (board game)

Le Havre is a board game about the development of the town of Le Havre. It was inspired by the games Caylus and Agricola and was developed in December 2007.

=== Norman language ===
Main articles: Norman language and Cauchois dialect.

The legacy of the Norman language is present in the language used by the people of Le Havre, part of which is identified as speaking cauchois. Among the Norman words most used in Le Havre there are: boujou (hello, goodbye), clenche (door handle), morveux (veuse) (child), and bezot (te) (last born).

== Education ==
=== Schools ===
Le Havre is located in the Academy of Rouen. The city operates 55 kindergartens (254 classes) and 49 communal primary schools (402 classes). The department manages 16 colleges and the region of Normandy manages 9 schools. The Jules Valles college in Caucriauville is classified as a sensitive institution and eleven colleges are in a priority education zone (ZEP). A boarding school of excellence, the Claude Bernard college, opened in 2011. The first college in Le Havre dates to the 16th century, the high school François I was founded during the Second Empire and is the oldest in Le Havre. The philosopher Jean-Paul Sartre (1905–1980) and Raymond Aron (1905–1983) taught there. The writer Armand Salacrou (1899–1989) studied in this institution.

==== Public junior high schools (collèges) ====
- Collège Claude Bernard
- Collège des Acacias
- Collège Descartes
- Collège Eugène Varlin
- Collège Gérard Philipe
- Collège Guy Moquet
- Collège Henri Wallon
- Collège Irène Joliot-Curie
- Collège Jacques Monod
- Collège Jean Moulin
- Collège Jules Vallès
- Collège Léo Lagrange
- Collège Raoul Dufy
- Collège Romain Rolland
- Collège Théophile Gautier
- Collège Marcel Pagnol

==== Private junior high schools ====
- Collège du Sacré Cœur
- Collège Saint-Joseph
- Collège Les Ormeaux
- Collège Montesquieu

==== Public sixth-form colleges/senior high schools ====
- Lycée Claude Monet
- Lycée général et technologique Porte-Océane
- Lycée François I
- Lycée général et technologique Robert Schuman
- Lycée Jules Siegfried

==== Private sixth-form colleges/senior high schools ====
- Lycée Saint-Joseph

==== Public vocational high schools ====
- Lycée technique et professionnel Françoise de Grâce
- Lycée professionnel Jules Lecesne (Hotel trades and services)
- Lycée professionnel Jules Siegfried (Electronic and Mechanical trades)
- Lycée professionnel Antoine Laurent de Lavoisier (Transport and Logistics – Metallic structures – automobiles)
- Lycée professionnel Auguste Perret (Housing trades)
- Lycée professionnel Claude Monet (Accounting – Secretarial)
- Lycée professionnel Porte Océane (Accounting – Secretarial)
- Lycée professionnel Robert Schuman (Industry)

==== Private vocational high schools ====
- Lycée professionnel Germaine Coty
- Lycée professionnel Saint Vincent de Paul
- Lycée professionnel Jeanne d'Arc

=== Special schools and higher education ===
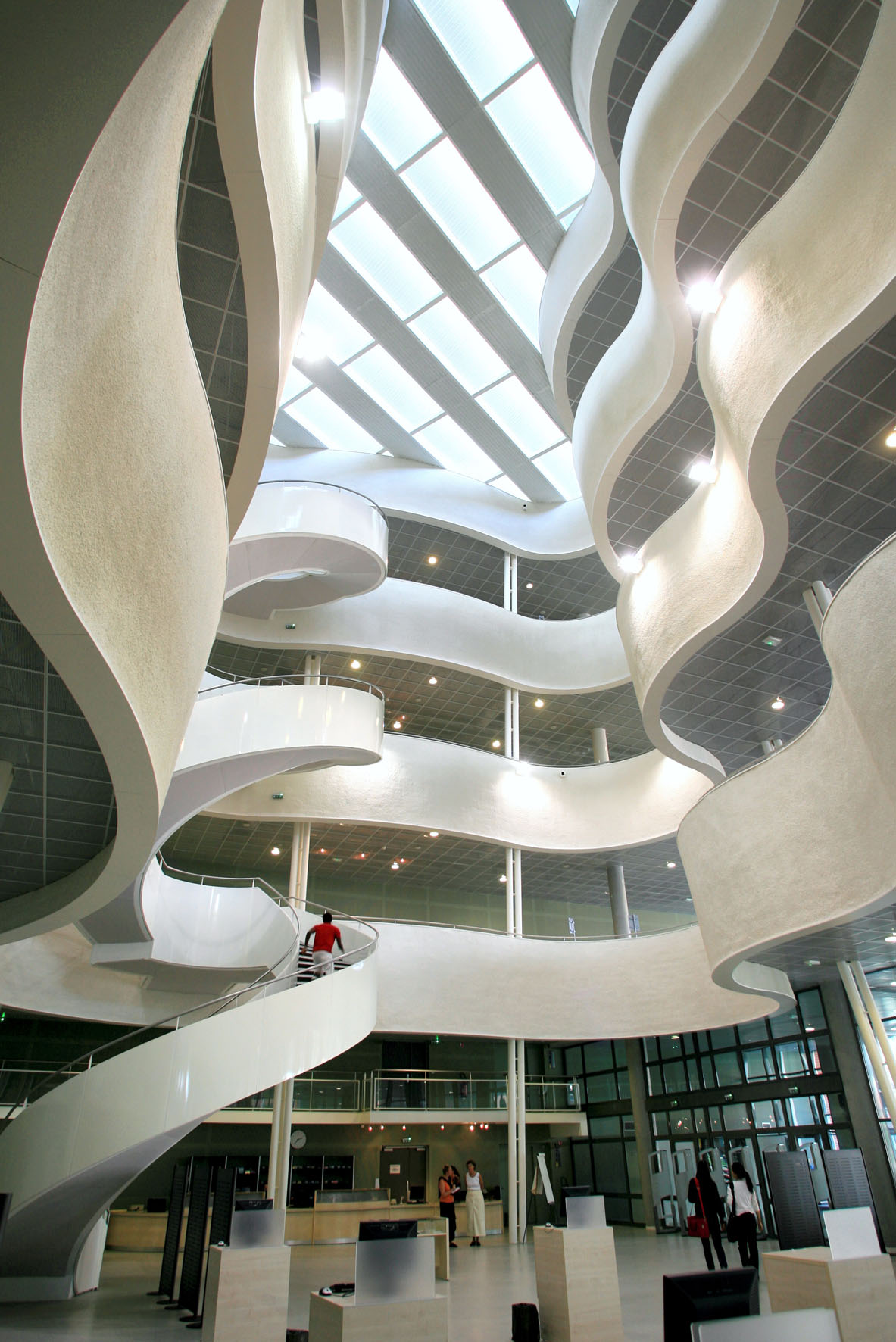
The interior of the University of Le Havre library

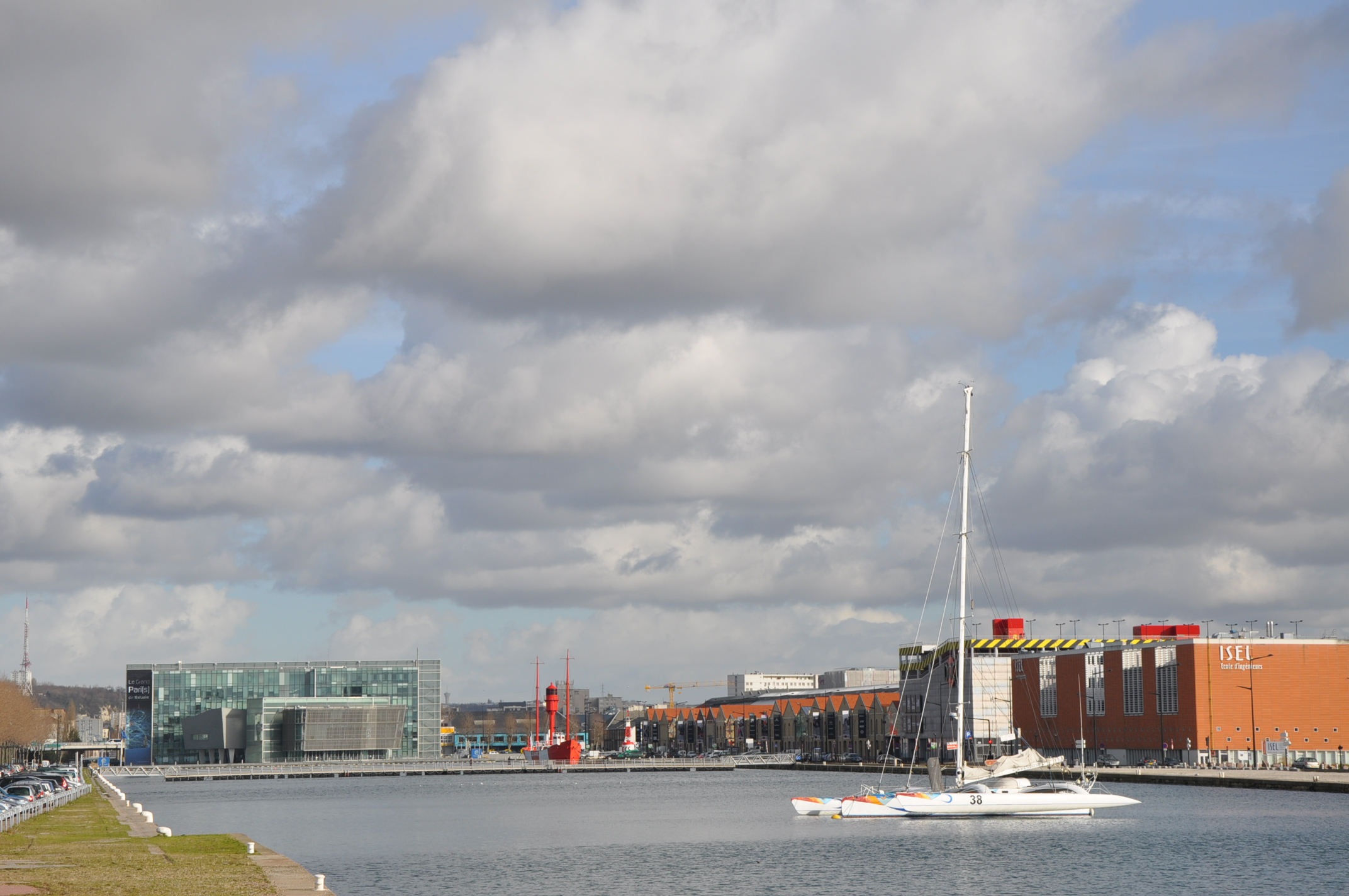
The Vauban Basin and the ISEL building (right)

In 2011 there were approximately 12,000 students in all disciplines in Le Havre. Opened in 1986, the University of Le Havre is recent, medium-sized and well located: the largest campus is virtually in the centre of the city near railway and tram stations. The campus includes a University Library (2006), a gym, several dining halls with student housing, a structure incorporating a theatre, an orientation service, and student associations. In 2010–2011, 6,914 students were enrolled including 5,071 undergraduates, 1,651 Masters students, and 192 postgraduate students. The university also trains 317 engineering students including the Logistical Studies Higher Education Institute (ISEL). It offers 120 Diplomas of State prepared by the Faculty of Science and Technology, Faculty of International Affairs, and the Faculty of Arts and Humanities. Many courses are offered are related to the port operations, logistics, industry, and sustainable development. Twelve languages are taught and 17% of students are foreigners. The University of Le Havre is also a research centre with nine laboratories. It works in partnership with other higher education institutions (INSA Rouen, IEP, IUFM, and Normandy University). The University Institutes of Technology of Le Havre occupies two main sites: one in the upper town in the Caucriauville-Rouelles district which was opened in 1967 and another in the Eure district since 2011. The IUT has a total of 1,881 students divided into ten departments preparing for the DUT. There is also a branch of the teacher training institute of Rouen (IUFM) for two courses (CAPET of technology and CRPE school teacher).

In addition there is a large number of specialized higher education institutions covering a wide range of different areas. Founded in 1871, the École Supérieure de Commerce du Havre, one of the oldest in France, has merged with Sup Europe and l'IPER to create the Normandy Business School in 2006. This school had over 2,800 students on its five campuses (Le Havre, Caen, Deauville, Oxford and Paris) in 2015. Since the 2007 school year, the Institute of Political Studies of Paris (Sciences Po) opened a campus focused on studies of Europe and Asia in Le Havre. The National School of The Merchant Marine trains Officers of the First Class for the Merchant Marine: currently located at Sainte-Adresse, it will move to the Bassin Vauban in 2015 in a building that will house 1,000 students. The National Higher School of Petrol and Motors (ENSPM) is a school for specialist petroleum engineers, petrochemists, and engine makers. The ITIP (National Institute for International Transportation and Ports) prepares students for careers in the multimodal transport and port business. The (Institut national des sciences appliquées|National Institute of Applied Sciences of Rouen) (INSA) opened a branch in Le Havre in 2008 with a civil engineering and sustainable construction department. The SPI (Axis of Science for the Engineer) is expected to reopen in 2012 in a new building in the Eure district.

In the arts, the Conservatory of Departmental Radiance Arthur Honegger is attended by 1,680 students (music, dance and drama). The Graduate School of Art of Le Havre (ESAH) offers several degrees and preparation for competition. Finally 800 people study in paramedical and social schools mostly in the IFSI (Institute of Training in Nursing) which has approximately 600 students.

== Sports ==
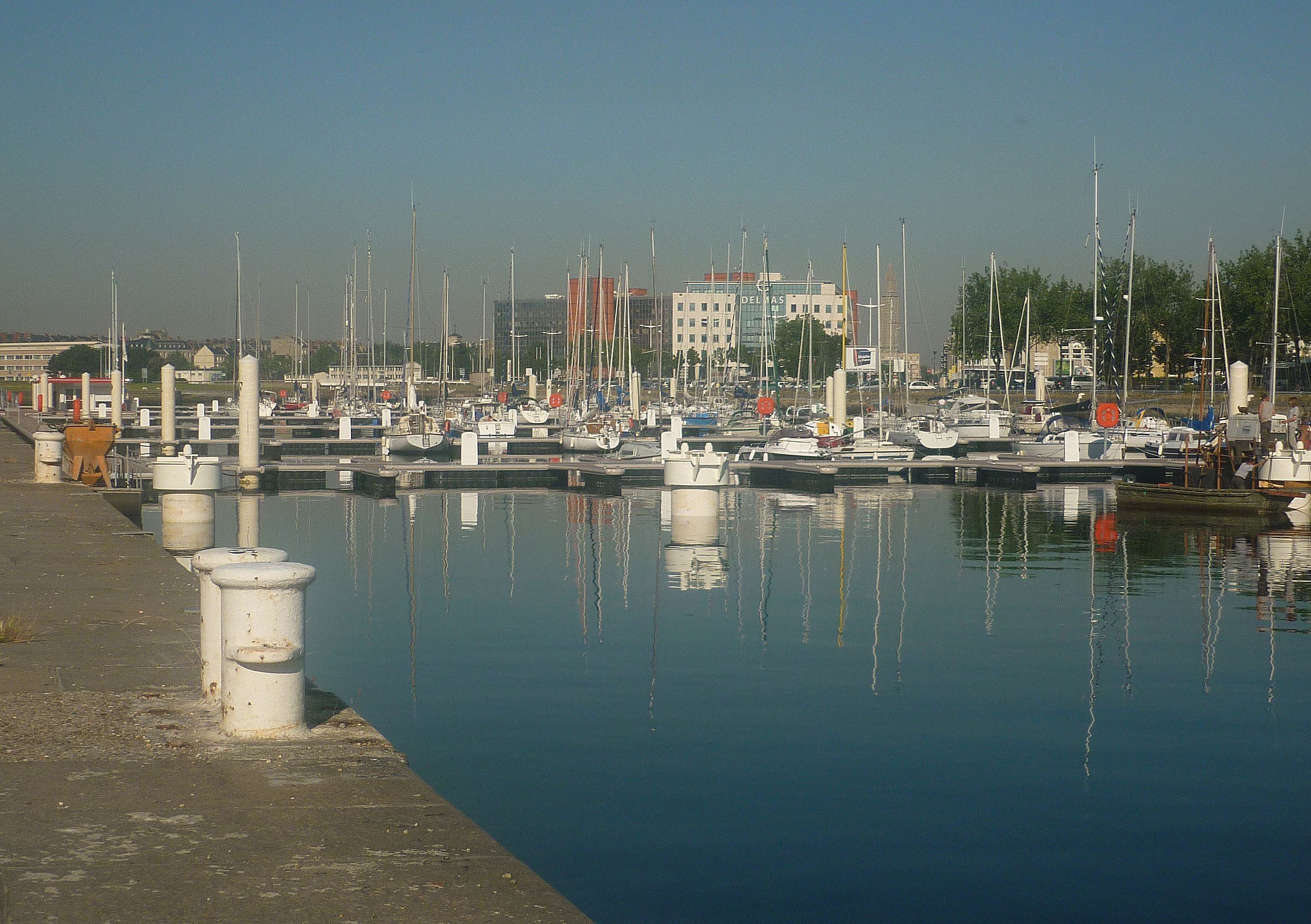
Port Vauban

The city of Le Havre has some of the oldest sports clubs in France: the Le Havre Rowing Society (1838), the Regatta Society of Le Havre (1838), and Le Havre Athletic Club (1872), doyen of French football and rugby clubs.

The city also hosted the sailing events for the 1900 and 1924 Summer Olympics, respectively.

Le Havre is dominated by three professional sports teams: the first is the Le Havre AC football team who were relegated from Ligue 1 after the 2008–2009 season but gained promotion back to Ligue 1 in 2023. Its training centre is well-reputed for having trained a number of international French players, including Vikash Dhorasoo, Julien Faubert, Jean-Alain Boumsong, Lassana Diarra, and Steve Mandanda. The second major sports team is Saint Thomas Basketball who represent the city in LNB Pro A. Thirdly the HAC women's team who play in the first division with many international players in its ranks. The team won their first major national title, the Coupe de France for women's handball in 2006.

In addition there are other sporting clubs, Le Havre Rugby athletic club plays in Fédérale 3 (equivalent to fifth division). Two local football clubs have reached the fifth tier of the French football league system, Le Havre Caucriauville Sportif who play at the Stade Jules Ladoumegue and Entente Sportive du Mont Gaillard, who play at Stade Du Mont Gaillard. The Hockey Club of Le Havre played at the fourth level nationally (Division 3) for the 2008–2009 season. The team is nicknamed the "Dock's du Havre".

The maritime side of the city is found in many sports: for example, the tradition of sailing is old. On 29 July 1840 the first French pleasure boat regatta was held. Today, Le Havre is known as a water sports and Seaside resort. The marina can host deepwater vessels around the clock in any weather. Built in the Interwar period, it is now the largest in Seine-Maritime with about 1,300 moorings additional moorings were installed in the Vauban basin in 2011–2012. The Havraise Rowing Society has trained many rowers to a high level as Thierry Renault. The Club Nautique Le Havrais (CNH) is the centre of mixed swimming, synchronized swimming, and men's water polo. The Centre Nautique Paul Vatine is the fifth largest club in the country for the number of sports licenses it holds; it ranks second in the Division 1 of the Championship France for Catamaran Clubs.

Several major local sportsmen began their career at Le Havre: the swimmer Hugues Duboscq was an Olympic medallist several times. In judo the French team has two members from Le Havre: Dimitri Dragin and Baptiste Leroy. Jerome Le Banner is a professional kick-boxer at world level who participates in the K-1 championship. Finally the navigator Paul Vatine, who was lost at sea in 1999, won the Transat Jacques Vabre several times.

=== Facilities ===
The Stade Océane

The city has 99 sports facilities including 46 gymnasiums, 23 sports fields, and 5 swimming pools. The Stade Océane (Ocean Stadium), inaugurated in July 2012, replaced the Stade Jules Deschaseaux. With 25,000 seats, it can host football matches as well as other sporting and cultural events. Basketball and Handball matches are playued in the Dock Océane hall (3600 seats) while ice hockey is played at the ice hockey rink (900 seats). Of the five swimming pools in the city, two are operated by the municipality: the CNH (which has an Olympic pool for competitions) and Les Bains Des Docks (which was designed by the architect Jean Nouvel). Le Havre has the largest free outdoor skatepark in France with approximately 7,000 m2 allocated to the urban Boardsport. The port infrastructure allows for many water activities such as sailing, fishing, canoeing, and rowing. Finally, the beach is a place for kitesurfing, windsurfing and surfing.

=== Events ===
Le Havre has been and is still the venue of major sports events: the Tour de France has passed a dozen times by the Ocean Gate, the last stage took place here in 2015. Sailing events are often held and the Transat Jacques Vabre transatlantic race has been held every two years since 1993 linking Le Havre to Latin America. The course of the Solitaire du Figaro was partly in Le Havre in 2010. Since 2006, weekends of freestyle board sports have been popular (skateboarding, rollerblading, funboard, kiteboarding, skydiving etc.). Every summer roller blade events are organized in the city on Friday evening every fortnight and have great success. The first International Triathlon was held in 2012. Finally, there are several opportunities for runners with ten kilometres (6.2 miles) in Le Havre or the strides of Montgeon.

== Media ==
Five newspapers cover the Le Havre agglomeration: the dailies Le Havre libre, Le Havre Presse, Paris Normandie in its Le Havre edition in collaboration with Le Havre Presse and Liberté-Dimanche (communal Sunday edition of the previous three) are part of the Hersant group which is currently in serious financial trouble and looking for a buyer. A free weekly of information, Le Havre Infos (PubliHebdo group) has been published since 2010 every Wednesday and is available in many places in the city.

Several magazines provide local information: LH Océanes (Municipal magazine) and Terres d'Agglo (Agglomeration Area magazine) to which must be added several free magazines: Aux Arts (cultural information more focused on the Basse-Normandie region) Bazart (cultural events in Le Havre but now with circulation across all of Normandy), and HAC Magazine (news about HAC). Several newspapers are also available on the Internet: Infocéane, Le Havre on the Internet.

A local televised edition on France 3, France 3 Baie de Seine, is broadcast every evening then again on France 3 Haute Normandie. Radio Albatros is a local station installed in the Sanvic du Havre district transmitting on FM frequency 88.2. Radio Vallée de la Lézarde, based in Épouville, RESONANCE on 98.9, and RCF Le Havre are other radio stations. It was in Le Havre radio stations that the journalist and television host Laurent Ruquier, who was born in Le Havre in 1963, began his career. Several national and regional radio stations are relays for Le Havre: local information on France Bleu Haute Normandie, local relay from 12 noon to 4pm on Virgin radio Normandie 101.8 FM, local relay for Information from 6am to 9am and from 4pm to 8pm on NRJ Le Havre 92.5 FM. Associations like LHnouslanuit and Only-Hit have tried to develop alternative and cultural local radio by featuring local community associations (Papa's Production, Ben Salad Prod, Asso6Sons, Agend'Havre, Pied Nu, I Love LH).

=== Religion ===
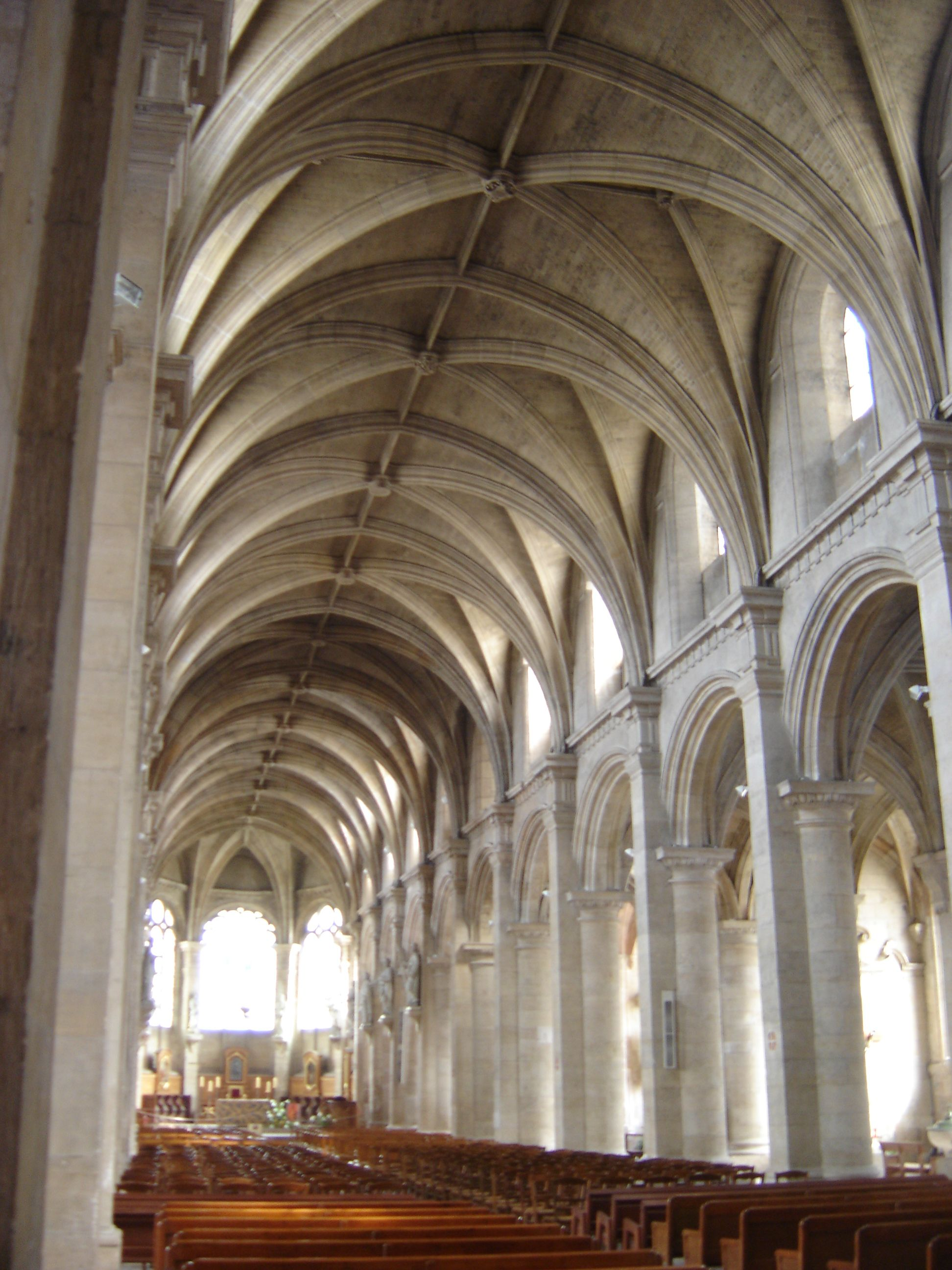
The nave of Le Havre Cathedral.

At the request of Monsigneur André Mulch, Archbishop of Rouen, Pope Paul VI decided on 6 July 1974 through the papal bull Quae Sacrosanctum on the creation of the diocese of Le Havre (Portus Gratiae in Latin meaning "Port of Grace"). The diocese was created from part of the parishes of the Archdiocese of Rouen to the west of a line joining Norville to Sassetot-le-Mauconduit. Monseigneur Michel Saudreau, its first bishop, was ordained on 22 September 1974. The church of Notre Dame was promoted to Cathedral Notre Dame du Havre. Today, the commune of Le Havre is divided into eight parishes and 24 places of worship (churches and chapels). The oldest chapel is Saint-Michel d'Ingouville which dates back to the 11th century. The Church of Saint Joseph du Havre, built by Auguste Perret, dominates the city with its spire 107m high. There are several monastic establishments (Carmel of the Transfiguration, Franciscan Monastery, Little Sisters of the Poor, etc.).

The Protestant Church of Le Havre was built in the city centre in 1862. Bombed in 1941, it lost its pediment, its bell tower, and roof. Rebuilt in 1953 by the architects Jacques Lamy and Gérard Dupasquier, who worked in the Auguste Perret office, is the only building in Le Havre uniting the original architecture of the 19th century with the architecture of the Perret school. Le Havre also has seven evangelical Protestant churches: Salvation Army, Seventh Day Adventist, Apostolic Church, Assembly of God, Baptist Church, Good News Church, et Church of Le Havre as well as several Protestant churches of African origin.

The city also has seven Muslim places of worship: the socio-cultural association of Muslims in Upper Normandy, En-Nour Mosque on Rue Paul Claudel, El Fath Mosque on rue Victor Hugo, Bellevue mosque on rue Gustavus Brindeau, and three prayer rooms located on rue Audran, Boulevard Jules Durant, and rue Lodi. The synagogue, located in the rebuilt central city, was visited by President Jacques Chirac in April 2002. It is the seat of the association consistoriale israélite du Havre whose president is Victor Elgressy.

== Notable people ==
Le Havre was the birthplace of:

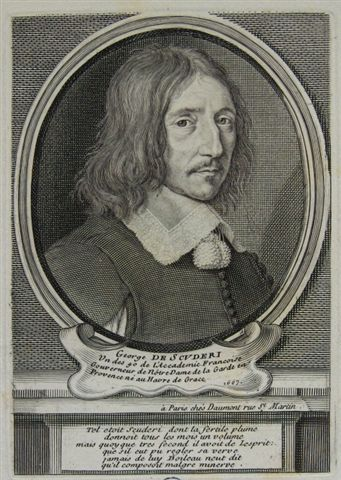
Georges de Scudéry

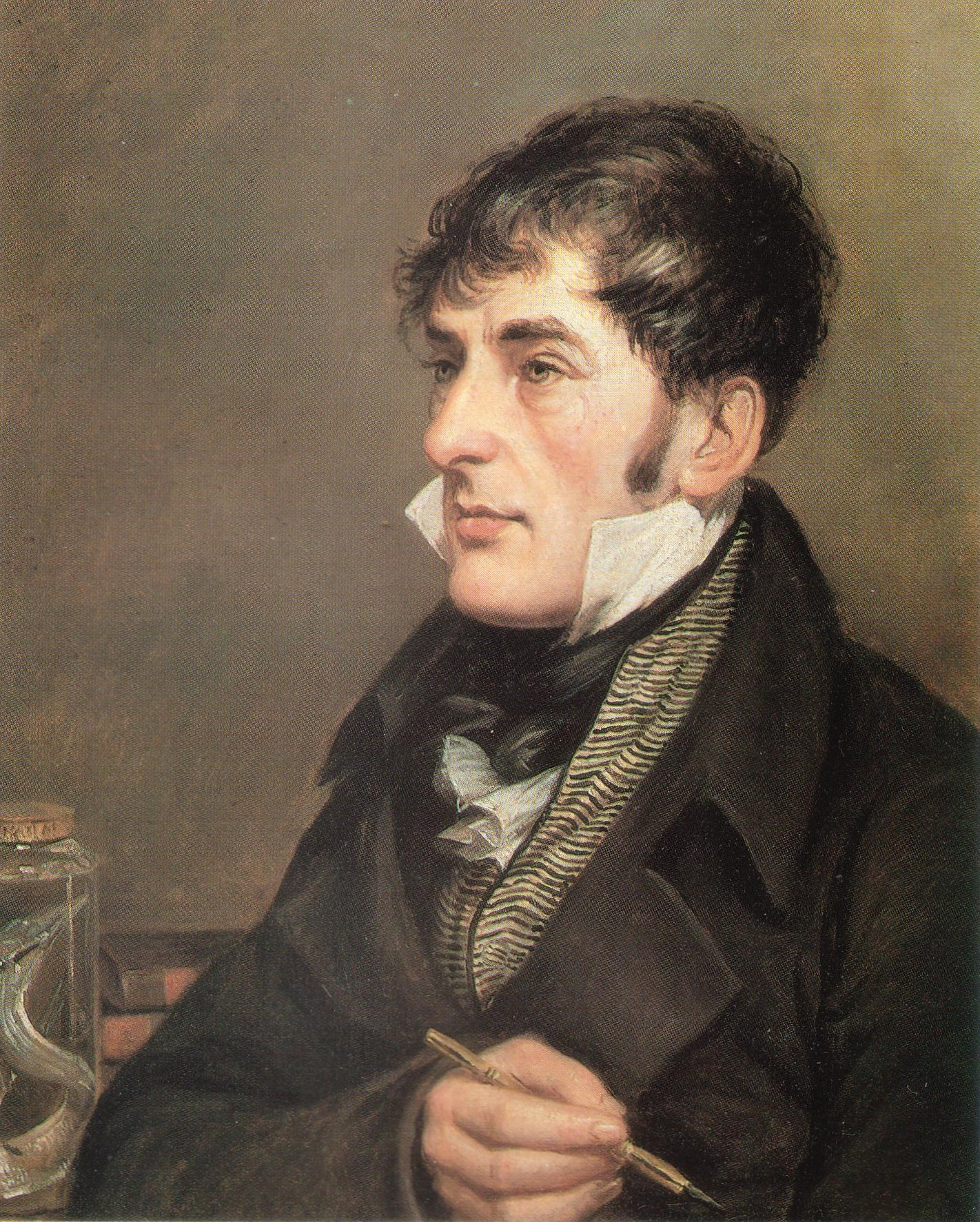
Charles Alexandre Lesueur, 1818

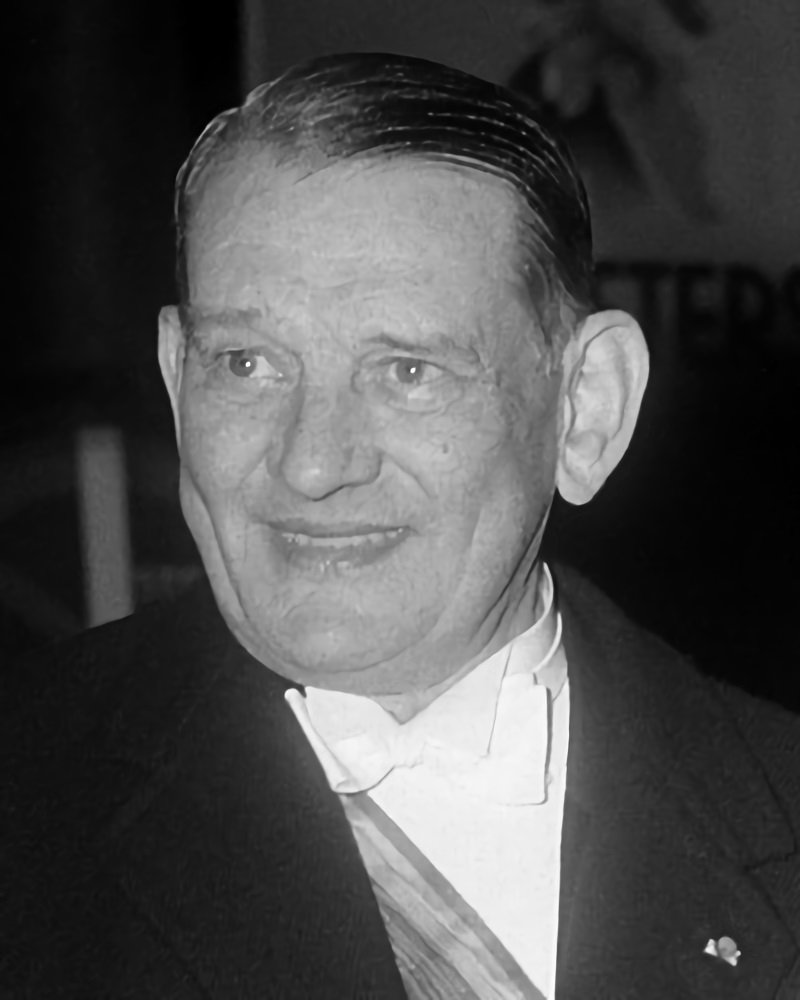
René Coty, 1954

- Georges de Scudéry (1601–1667), novelist, dramatist and poet.
- Madeleine de Scudéry (1607–1701), writer.
- Jacques-Henri Bernardin de Saint-Pierre (1737–1814), writer and botanist.
- Charles Alexandre Lesueur (1778–1846), naturalist, artist and explorer
- Casimir Delavigne (1793–1843), poet and dramatist.
- Jacques-François Ancelot (1794–1854), dramatist and litterateur.
- Frédérick Lemaître (1800–1876), actor and playwright.
- Eleanor Mary Dennistoun Sellar (1829–1918), Scottish memoirist
- Léon Gautier (1832–1897), literary historian.
- Gabriel Monod (1844–1912), historian.
- Alfred-Louis Brunet-Debaines (1845–c. 1935), artist
- Juliette Heuzey (1865-1952), writer
- Louis Bachelier (1870–1946), mathematician
- Raoul Dufy (1877–1953), painter
- André Caplet (1878–1925), composer and conductor
- René Coty (1882–1962), French president (1954–1959)
- Ivan Đaja (1884–1957), biologist, physiologist, author and philosopher
- Suzanne Balguerie (1888–1973), French soprano
- Arthur Honegger (1892–1955), composer, a member of Les Six
- Thomas Roberts (1893–1976), Roman Catholic archbishop
- Jean Dubuffet (1901–1985), artist
- Jean Mallon (1904–1982), palaeographer
- Raymond Queneau (1903–1976), poet and novelist
- Jacques Leguerney (1906–1997), composer
- Bénédicte Pesle (1927–2018), arts patron
- Jacqueline Danno (1931-2021). actress and singer.
- Tristan Murail (born 1947), composer
- Elvire Murail (born 1958), writer for children
- Laurent Ruquier (born 1963), journalist
- govy, (1981-2023), artist

=== Sport ===
- Paul Frère (1917–2008), Belgian racing driver
- Wilfried Nancy (born 1977), football manager
- Jérôme Le Banner (born 1972), kickboxer and K-1 fighter
- Vikash Dhorasoo, (born 1973), international footballer
- Olivier Davidas (born 1981), footballer
- Dimitri Dragin (born 1984), judoka
- Julien Faubert (born 1983), footballer
- Kevin Anin (born 1986), footballer
- Gueïda Fofana (born 1991), footballer
- Jaylen Hoard (born 1999), French-American basketball player for Hapoel Tel Aviv
- Dan Delaunay (born 1995), professional footballer.

=== Others, associated with the city ===
- Rex Cherryman (1896–1928), American actor, died here
- Jean-Paul Sartre (1905–1980), philosopher, taught at the Lycée François-Ier
- Patrick Demarchelier (1943–2022), fashion photographer, spent his childhood in Le Havre
- Christine Lagarde (born 1956), IMF managing director, grew up in Le Havre
- René Viénet (born 1944), sinologist
- Suzzane Fontaine (1894-1979), paternal grandmother of Pope Leo XIV

== See also ==
- Pierre-Marie Poisson, Le Havre War Memorial
- Jean-Marie Baumel, sculpture of several bas-reliefs in Le Havre
