= Dossou =

Dossou is both a given name and a surname. Notable people with the name include:

- Dossou Vignissy (born 1954), Beninese sprinter
- Daniel Dohou Dossou (born 1959), Beninese judoka
- Jodel Dossou (born 1992), Beninese footballer
- Robert Dossou (born 1939), Beninese politician
- Samuel Dossou-Aworet (born 1944), Beninese businessman
- Noel Dossou-Yovo (1943–2011), Beninese academic
- Myriam Dossou D'Almeida (born 1967), Togolese politician
- Honorine Dossou Naki (born 1946), Gabonese politician
- Celtus Dossou Yovo (born 1986), Beninese judoka
