= Luc Lemonnier =

French politician

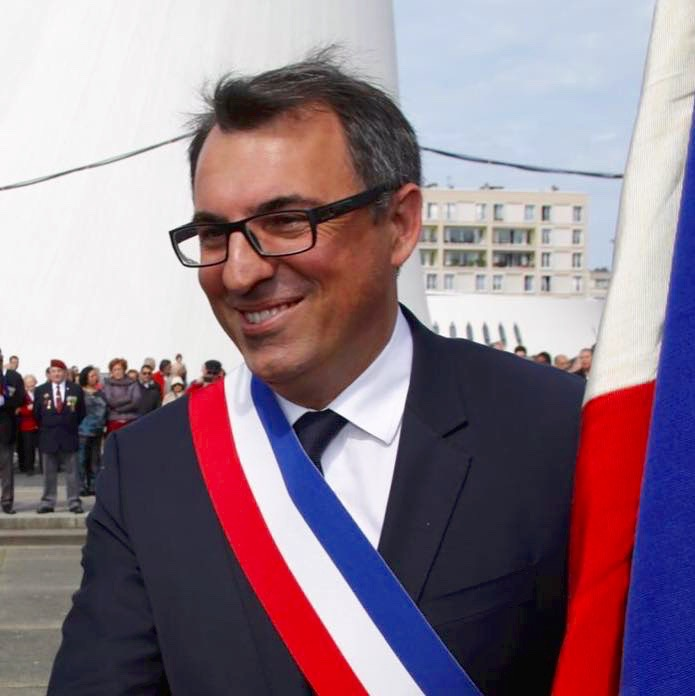
- Luc Lemonnier in 2016

Mayor of Le Havre
- In office 28 May 2017 – 21 March 2019
- Preceded by: Édouard Philippe
- Succeeded by: Jean-Baptiste Gastinne

President of the Le Havre Seine Métropole urban community
- In office 1 January 2019 – 21 March 2019
- Succeeded by: Jean-Baptiste Gastinne

President of the Agglomeration community of Le Havre
- In office 25 June 2017 – 31 December 2018
- Preceded by: Édouard Philippe

Departmental Councilor of Seine-Maritime
- In office 2 April 2015 – 25 March 2019

Vice-president of the departmental council of Seine-Maritime
- In office 2 April 2015 – 25 March 2019
- President: Pascal Martin
- Constituency: Canton of Le Havre-6

Personal details
- Born: May 22, 1968 (age 57) Le Havre, Seine-Maritime
- Party: LR (since 2015)
- Other political affiliations: UMP (2007-2015)
- Education: IUT of Le Havre; ENASS

Luc Lemonnier (French pronunciation: [lyk ləmɔnje]; born May 22, 1968, in Le Havre) is a French politician, mayor of Le Havre from 2017 to 2019.

== Biography ==
=== Early life ===
Luc Lemonnier spent part of his childhood in Creil.

He was a student at the Gabriel-Havez college in Creil from 1979 to 1983. Back in Le Havre, he took a DUT in marketing techniques at the University Institute of Technology in Le Havre and then graduated in 1992 from the National Insurance School (ENASS). It is within the maritime company Maersk, in Le Havre, that he began his career. In 1993, he joined MACSF, a mutual insurance company specializing in the health professions. After the creation of an agency in Le Havre, he joined the Rennes agency in 1997 and became regional councillor for Brittany until 2003.

In 2003, he chose to return to Le Havre and joined with his father to co-manage the family insurance firm AXA.

Luc Lemonnier has four children.

=== Political career ===
He became deputy mayor in 2013. He was re-elected in the 2014 municipal elections on the list of Édouard Philippe, of which he was the campaign manager, and became first deputy.

In 2015, he was elected to the departmental council of Seine-Maritime (6th canton of Le Havre) in tandem with Christelle Msica Guerout. He was delegated to finance, departmental domain and vehicle fleet.

Following the appointment of Édouard Philippe as Prime Minister, Luc Lemonnier was elected mayor of Le Havre on May 28, 2017. He also succeeded him as president of the urban community of Le Havre on June 25, 2017, as well as at the Metropolitan centre of the Seine Estuary.

He was a member of La France Audacieuse, a movement launched by Christian Estrosi. In January 2018, he expressed his doubts about the renewal of his membership in LR, indicating that he had not “had good signs since the appointment of Laurent Wauquiez".

In early 2019, he was accused of having repeatedly sent photos of himself naked to women without their consent. On March 21, 2019, he resigned from his mandate as mayor because of this scandal. According to Le Monde, he was forced to resign by Édouard Philippe. On March 25, 2019, he also resigned from his functions of vice-president and departmental advisor of Seine-Maritime.
