= Daniel Colliard =

French politician (1930–2022)

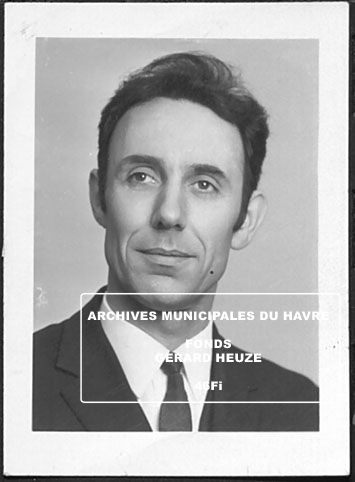

Mayor of Le Havre
- In office 10 October 1994 – 25 June 1995
- Preceded by: André Duroméa
- Succeeded by: Antoine Rufenacht

Member of the French National Assembly
- In office 2 April 1993 – 21 April 1997
- Preceded by: André Duroméa
- Succeeded by: Daniel Paul
- Constituency: Seine-Maritime's 8th constituency

General Councilor of the Canton of Le Havre-5
- In office 1976–1982
- Preceded by: Robert Lenoble
- Succeeded by: Jean-Yves Besselat

Personal details
- Born: 14 August 1930 Dieppe, France
- Died: 2 January 2022 (aged 91) Le Havre, France
- Party: PCF

Daniel Colliard (French pronunciation: [danjɛl kɔljaʁ]; 14 August 1930 – 2 January 2022) was a French politician. He was a member of the French Communist Party (PCF).

== Life and career ==
Colliard was born to a Catholic family who moved to Le Havre in 1938. During his education, he was a member of Jeunesse Étudiante Chrétienne. He became employed as a cement worker during the 1950s to help reconstruct the city following World War II. He joined the PCF in 1955 and took on responsibilities at the party's headquarters.

He was elected to the Municipal Council of Le Havre in 1956 and became deputy mayor to René Cance and André Duroméa. When Duroméa resigned on 10 October 1994, Colliard replaced him and became mayor of Le Havre. Colliard was elected to the National Assembly in 1993 and represented Seine-Maritime's 8th constituency from 1993 to 1997. Additionally, he was General Councilor of the Canton of Le Havre-5 from 1976 to 1982.

Colliard died in Le Havre on 2 January 2022, at the age of 91.
