= Jean-Baptiste Gastinne =

French politician

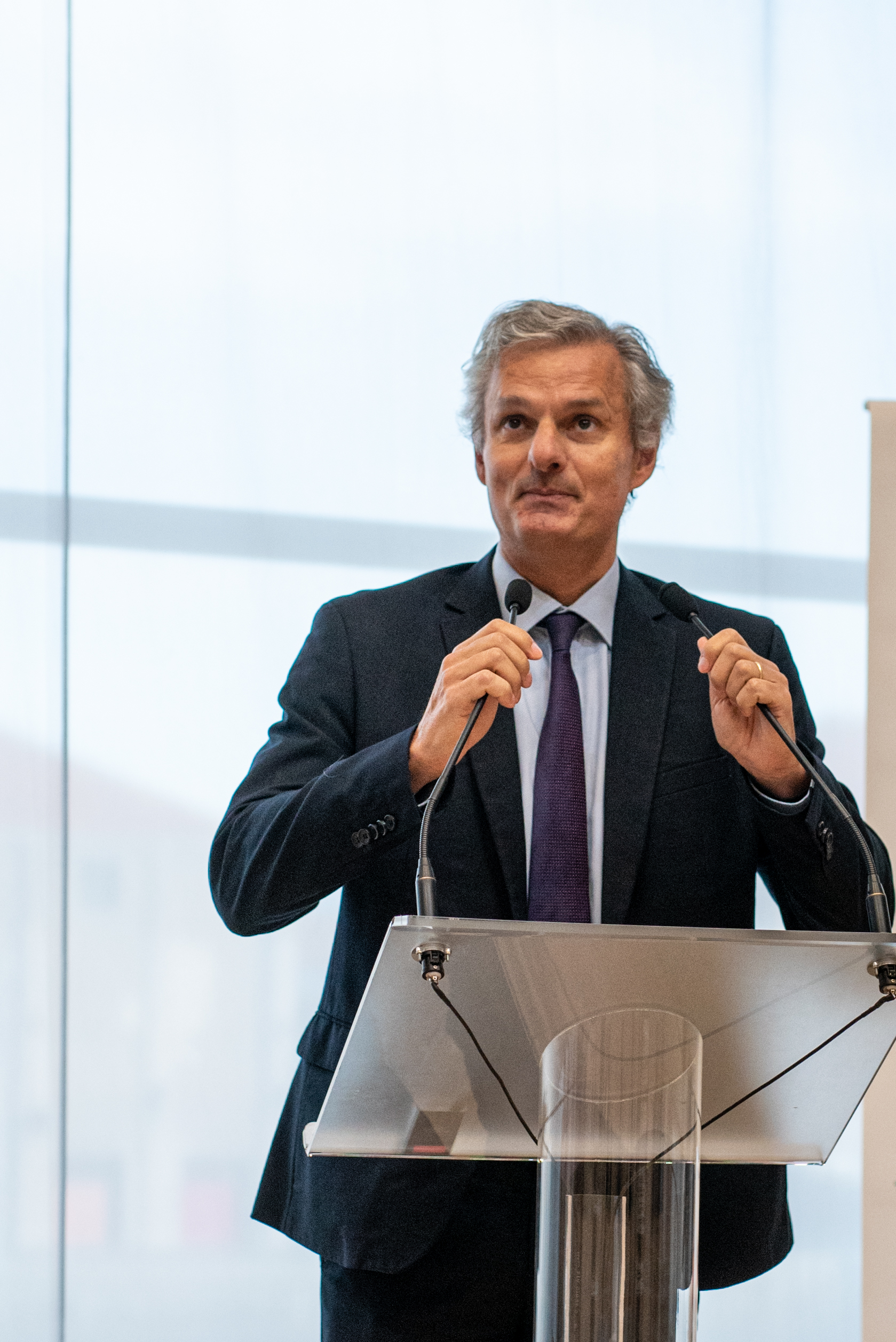
- Gastinne in Le Havre, 2021

Vice-president of the Regional Council of Normandy in charge of Transport, Ports and Seine Valley
- Incumbent
- Assumed office 4 January 2016
- President: Hervé Morin

Regional Councilor for Upper Normandy (later Normandy)
- Incumbent
- Assumed office 22 March 2010
- President: Alain Le Vern; Hervé Morin

President of Le Havre Seine Métropole
- In office 5 April 2019 – 15 July 2020
- Preceded by: Luc Lemonnier
- Succeeded by: Édouard Philippe

Mayor of Le Havre
- In office 30 March 2019 – 5 July 2020
- Preceded by: Luc Lemonnier
- Succeeded by: Édouard Philippe

Personal details
- Born: June 2, 1967 (age 59) Paris, France
- Party: The Republicans (since 2015)
- Other political affiliations: UMP (2002-2015); FRS-PCD (2002-2016)

Jean-Baptiste Gastinne (born June 2, 1967 in Paris) is a French teacher and politician. He was the mayor of Le Havre from 2019 to 2020.

== Biography ==
=== Professional career ===
Holder of an agrégation in history, he taught at Jacques-Monod college in Le Havre from 1993 to 1994 then at Raoul-Dufy college between 1994 and 2010. He has been teaching since 2010 at François-I high school in Le Havre. In 2019, he interrupted his professional activity after his election as mayor of Le Havre.

In 2008, he received a doctorate in history from the University of Paris IV Sorbonne.

=== Political journey ===
He was a member of the UMP and then of the Republicans since 2002. Between 2002 and 2016, he was a member of the Forum of Social Republicans, which was renamed to Christian Democratic Party.

In 2008, he was elected to the Havre city council on the list led by Antoine Rufenacht. In 2010, he was elected regional councilor for the Upper Normandy region on Bruno Le Maire's list.

In 2011, he became deputy mayor of Le Havre, Édouard Philippe, in charge of town planning and the environment. In 2014, he was elected vice-president of the agglomeration community of Le Havre and then of the Le Havre Seine Métropole urban community in charge of economic development and tourism.

During the 2015 regional elections in Normandy, he was elected on the list of Hervé Morin who appointed him the 6th vice-president of the Region in charge of transport, ports and the Seine Valley.

On March 30, 2019, after the resignation of the mayor of Le Havre Luc Lemonnier, replacing Édouard Philippe who had become Prime Minister, he was elected mayor in the municipal council.

On April 4, 2019, he was elected president of the Le Havre Seine Métropole urban community.

Following the 2020 municipal elections and the return of Édouard Philippe to Le Havre, Jean-Baptiste Gastinne left him his post of mayor and became his first deputy.

== Books ==
Jean-Baptiste Gastinne is co-author and author of two books on the history of Le Havre:

- Gastinne, Jean-Baptiste (2021). Le Havre: à vivre et à aimer (in French). Éditions l'Écho des vagues. ISBN 978-2-918616-54-2.
- de Marceilles, Guillaume; Rouet, Dominique (2012). La première histoire du Havre: les Mémoires de Guillaume de Marceilles (in French). Éditions l'Écho des vagues. ISBN 978-2-918616-15-3.
- Gastinne, Jean-Baptiste (2016-03-22). Le Havre 1517-1789: Histoire d'une identité urbaine (in French). Presses universitaires de Rouen et du Havre. ISBN 979-10-240-0566-9.
