= Jean-Paul Lecoq =

French politician

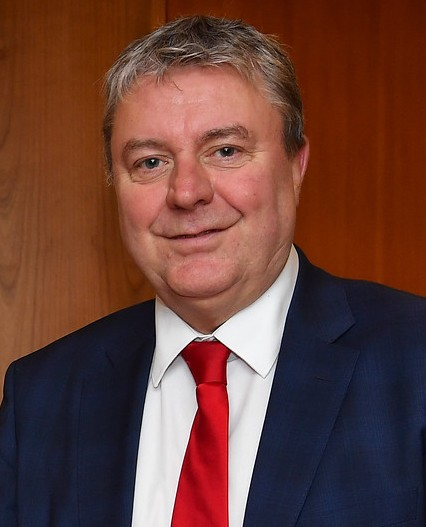
- Lecoq in 2018

Member of the National Assembly for Seine-Maritime's 8th constituency
- Incumbent
- Assumed office 21 June 2017
- Preceded by: Catherine Troallic

Member of the National Assembly for Seine-Maritime's 6th constituency
- In office 20 June 2007 – 20 June 2012
- Preceded by: Denis Merville
- Succeeded by: Sandrine Hurel

Municipal councillor of Le Havre
- Incumbent
- Assumed office 5 July 2020
- Mayor: Édouard Philippe

Mayor of Gonfreville-l'Orcher
- In office 25 June 1995 – 6 July 2017
- Preceded by: Marcel Le Mignot
- Succeeded by: Alban Bruneau

Personal details
- Born: 13 October 1958 (age 67) Le Havre, France
- Party: PCF

Jean-Paul Lecoq (French pronunciation: [ʒɑ̃ pɔl ləkɔk]; born 13 October 1958) is a member of the National Assembly of France. He represents Seine-Maritime's 8th constituency and is a member of the French Communist Party. In the 2020 French municipal elections, Lecoq was the lead Communist candidate opposing Edouard Philippe's municipal election campaign in Le Havre.
