= Seine-Maritime's 8th constituency =

Constituency of the National Assembly of France

8th constituency of Seine-Maritime
- inline Constituency of the National Assembly of France

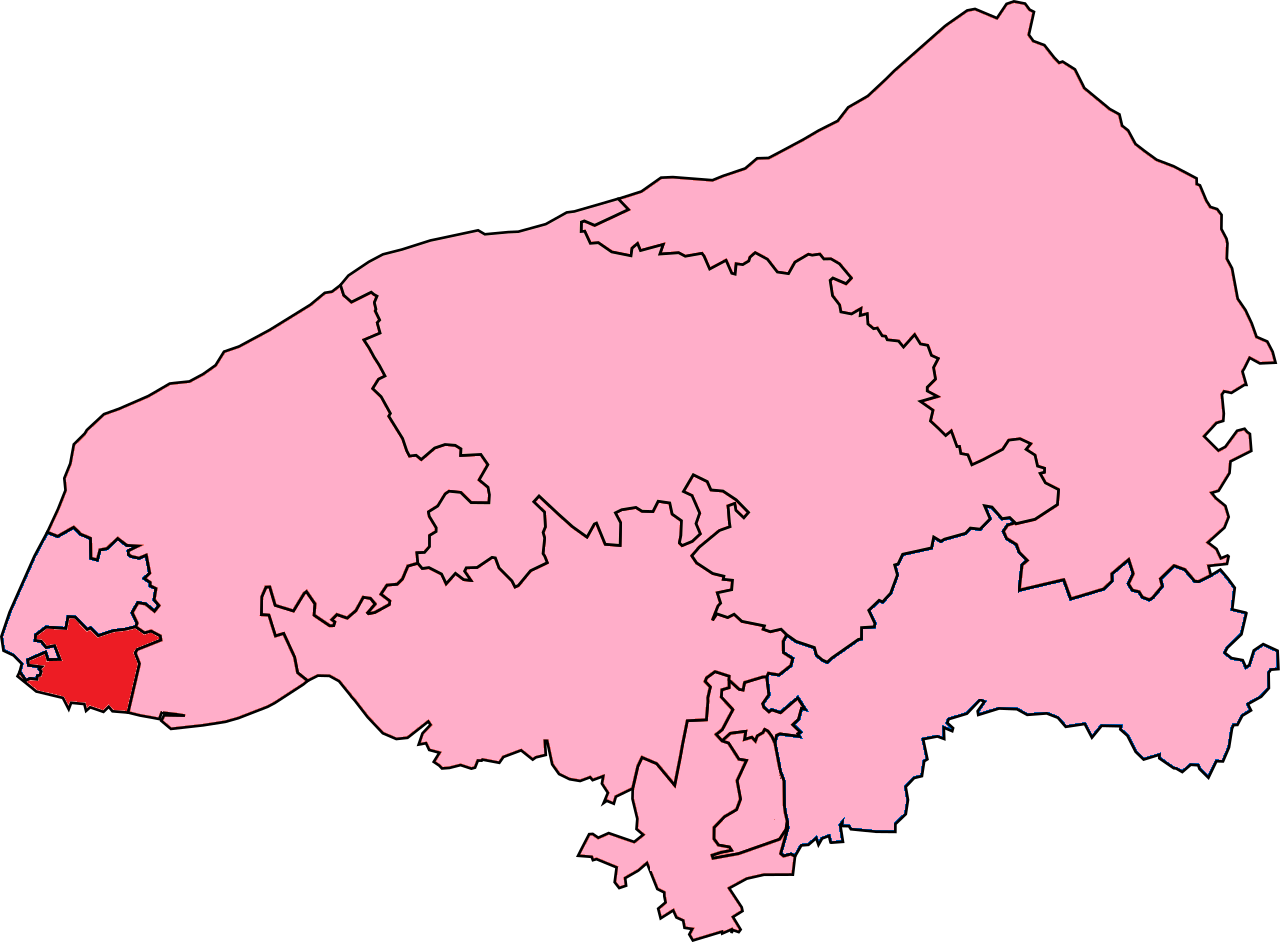
- Seine-Maritime's 8th Constituency shown within Seine-Maritime
- Deputy: Jean-Paul Lecoq; PCF
- Department: Seine-Maritime
- Cantons: Gonfreville-l'Orcher, Le Havre II, Le Havre III, Le Havre IV, Le Havre VIII, Le Havre IX
- Registered voters: 67666

The 8th constituency of the Seine-Maritime (French: Huitième circonscription de la Seine-Maritime) is a French legislative constituency in the Seine-Maritime département. Like the other 576 French constituencies, it elects one MP using the two-round system, with a run-off if no candidate receives over 50% of the vote in the first round.

== Description ==
The 8th Constituency of the Seine-Maritime covers Le Havre as well as Gonfreville-l'Orcher which was added as a result of the 2010 redistricting of French legislative constituencies.

The seat has historically been a stronghold of the French Communist Party, 2012 is the only recent election in which another party won, in this case the Socialist Party.

== Assembly Members ==
Election	Member	Party
1958	Robert Grèverie	CNIP
1962	Roger Fossé	UNR
1967	Roger Fossé	UDR
1968	Roger Fossé	UDR
1973	Roger Fossé	UDR
1978	Roger Fossé	RPR
1981	Roger Fossé	RPR
1986	Proportional representation – no election by constituency	
1988	André Duroméa	PCF
1993	Daniel Colliard	PCF
1997	Daniel Paul	PCF
2002	Daniel Paul	PCF
2007	Daniel Paul	PCF
2012	Catherine Troallic	PS
2017	Jean-Paul Lecoq	PCF
2022	Jean-Paul Lecoq	PCF

== Election results ==
=== 2024 ===
Legislative Election 2024: Seine-Maritime's 8th constituency
Party	Candidate	Votes	%	±%
LR	Benoît Naous	1,245	3.29	N/A
LO	Magali Cauchois	504	1.33	+0.06
HOR (Ensemble)	Régis Debons	8,040	21.24	−3.16
LR (UXD)	Isabelle Le Coz	11,855	31.32	+12.84
PCF (NFP)	Jean-Paul Lecoq	16,205	42.81	−5.94
Turnout		37,849	97.44	+58.09
Registered electors		64,476		
2nd round result
PCF	Jean-Paul Lecoq	23,040	63.08	−2.68
LR	Isabelle Le Coz	13,485	36.92	N/A
Turnout		36,525	93.69	+56.48
Registered electors		64,491		
PCF hold		Swing		

=== 2022 ===
Legislative Election 2022: Seine-Maritime's 8th constituency
Party	Candidate	Votes	%	±%
PCF (NUPÉS)	Jean-Paul Lecoq	12,227	48.75	+1.71
HOR (Ensemble)	Wasil Echchenna	6,120	24.40	+1.90
RN	Isabelle Le Coz	4,636	18.48	+4.00
REC	Isabelle Ducoeurjoly	854	3.40	N/A
PA	Joachim Legendre	553	2.20	N/A
LP (UPF)	Tony Lepretre	372	1.48	N/A
LO	Magali Cauchois	319	1.27	N/A
Turnout		25,879	39.35	−1.73
2nd round result
PCF (NUPÉS)	Jean-Paul Lecoq	15,117	65.76	+3.06
HOR (Ensemble)	Wasil Echchenna	7,872	34.24	−3.06
Turnout		22,989	37.21	+2.05
PCF hold				

=== 2017 ===
Legislative Election 2017: Seine-Maritime's 8th constituency
Party	Candidate	Votes	%	±%
PCF	Jean-Paul Lecoq	7,011	25.83	−4.43
LREM	Béatrice Delamotte	6,107	22.50	N/A
FN	Damien Lenoir	3,931	14.48	−0.12
LR	Sébastien Tasserie	2,658	13.48	−6.16
LFI	François Panchout	3,328	12.26	N/A
PS	Catherine Troallic	1,652	6.09	−24.41
EELV	Joséphine Landormi	775	2.86	+0.45
Others	N/A	680		
Turnout		27,798	41.08	−6.24
2nd round result
PCF	Jean-Paul Lecoq	13,911	62.70	N/A
LREM	Béatrice Delamotte	8,276	37.30	N/A
Turnout		23,790	35.16	+9.70
PCF gain from PS		Swing		

=== 2012 ===
Legislative Election 2012: Seine-Maritime's 8th constituency
Party	Candidate	Votes	%	±%
PS	Catherine Troallic	10,182	30.50	+12.65
PCF (FG)	Jean-Paul Lecoq*	10,099	30.26	+5.07
UMP	Agnès Canayer	6,555	19.64	−14.70
FN	Philippe Fouche-Saillenfest	4,875	14.60	+7.66
EELV	Pierre Dieulafait	803	2.41	N/A
Others	N/A	865		
Turnout		33,379	47.32	−2.61
2nd round result
PS	Catherine Troallic	17,959	100.00	N/A
Turnout		17,959	25.46	−24.45
PS gain from PCF				

* Withdrew before the 2nd round.

=== 2007 ===
Legislative Election 2007: Seine-Maritime's 8th constituency
Party	Candidate	Votes	%	±%
UMP	Agathe Cahierre	8,683	34.34	+6.32
PCF	Daniel Paul	6,369	25.19	−6.32
PS	Najwa Confaits	4,512	17.85	N/A
FN	Jean-François Touzé	1,755	6.94	−7.61
MoDem	Florent Saint Martin	1,271	5.03	N/A
DVG	Eric Donfu	612	2.42	−7.88
Others	N/A	2,080		
Turnout		26,115	49.93	−3.55
2nd round result
PCF	Daniel Paul	14,423	57.43	−0.03
UMP	Agathe Cahierre	10,689	42.57	+0.03
Turnout		26,101	49.91	−0.50
PCF hold				

=== 2002 ===
Legislative Election 2002: Seine-Maritime's 8th constituency
Party	Candidate	Votes	%	±%
PCF	Daniel Paul	8,708	31.51	+3.89
UMP	Édouard Philippe	7,742	28.02	N/A
FN	Nadine Le Monnier	4,021	14.55	−7.61
DVG	Eric Donfu	2,847	10.30	N/A
DIV	Philippe Fouche-Saillenfest	1,180	4.27	N/A
LV	Jerome Deschamps	842	3.05	+0.25
LCR	Pierre Jeanne	610	2.21	N/A
Others	N/A	1,682		
Turnout		28,139	53.48	−9.25
2nd round result
PCF	Daniel Paul	14,763	57.46	−9.28
UMP	Édouard Philippe	10,928	42.54	N/A
Turnout		26,521	50.41	−13.54
PCF hold				

=== 1997 ===
Legislative Election 1997: Seine-Maritime's 8th constituency
Party	Candidate	Votes	%	±%
PCF	Daniel Paul	9,140	27.62	
FN	Philippe Fouche-Saillenfest	7,333	22.16	
PS	Maryse Barec	6,743	20.37	
UDF	Agathe Cahierre	5,795	17.51	
GE	Edouard Delarue	1,065	3.22	
LV	Pierre Dieulafait	927	2.80	
Others	N/A	2,094		
Turnout		34,424	62.73	
2nd round result
PCF	Daniel Paul	21,132	66.74	
FN	Philippe Fouche-Saillenfest	10,529	33.26	
Turnout		35,083	63.95	
PCF hold				
