= Sainte-Adresse =

- Commune
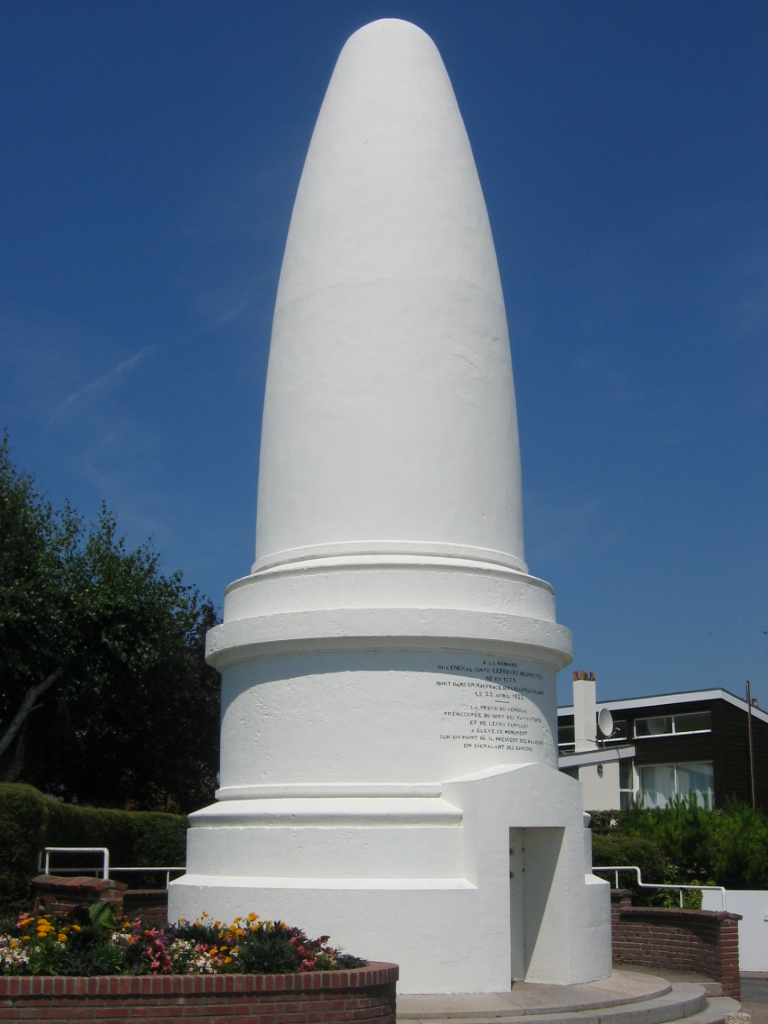
- Pain de sucre (Sugar-loaf) memorial

- Coat of arms
- Location of Sainte-Adresse
- Location within France Location within Normandy
- Coordinates: 49°31′N 0°05′E
- Country: France
- Region: Normandy
- Department: Seine-Maritime
- Arrondissement: Le Havre
- Canton: Le Havre-6
- Intercommunality: Le Havre Seine Métropole

Government
  - Mayor (2020–2026): Hubert Dejean de La Batie
- Area^{1}: 2.26 km^{2} (0.87 sq mi)
- Elevation: 100 m (330 ft)
- Highest elevation: 100 m (330 ft)
- Lowest elevation: 0 m (0 ft)
- Population (2023): 7,004
  - Density: 3,100/km^{2} (8,030/sq mi)
- Time zone: UTC+01:00 (CET)
  - Summer (DST): UTC+02:00 (CEST)
- INSEE/Postal code: 76552 /76310
- ^{1} French Land Register data, which excludes lakes, ponds, glaciers > 1 km^{2} (0.386 sq mi or 247 acres) and river estuaries.

Sainte-Adresse (French pronunciation: [sɛ̃t adʁɛs]) is a commune in the Seine-Maritime department in the region of Normandy, France.

== Geography ==
A coastal suburb situated some 2 miles (3.2 km) northwest of Le Havre city centre, at the junction of the D147 and the D940. The English Channel forms the western border of the commune.

=== Climate ===
Sainte-Adresse has an oceanic climate (Köppen climate classification Cfb). The average annual temperature in Sainte-Adresse is 11.8 °C (53.2 °F). The average annual rainfall is 789.8 mm (31.09 in) with December as the wettest month. The temperatures are highest on average in August, at around 18.4 °C (65.1 °F), and lowest in January, at around 5.7 °C (42.3 °F). The highest temperature ever recorded in Sainte-Adresse was 38.2 °C (100.8 °F) on 18 July 2022; the coldest temperature ever recorded was −13.8 °C (7.2 °F) on 17 January 1985.

Climate data for Sainte-Adresse (Cap-de-la-Heve, altitude 100m, 1991–2020 normals, extremes 1891–present)
Month	Jan	Feb	Mar	Apr	May	Jun	Jul	Aug	Sep	Oct	Nov	Dec	Year
Record high °C (°F)	15.0 (59.0)	20.0 (68.0)	24.5 (76.1)	26.5 (79.7)	30.0 (86.0)	34.7 (94.5)	38.2 (100.8)	36.3 (97.3)	33.6 (92.5)	28.5 (83.3)	20.0 (68.0)	16.4 (61.5)	38.2 (100.8)
Mean daily maximum °C (°F)	7.6 (45.7)	8.0 (46.4)	10.5 (50.9)	13.3 (55.9)	16.2 (61.2)	19.0 (66.2)	20.9 (69.6)	21.2 (70.2)	19.1 (66.4)	15.5 (59.9)	11.3 (52.3)	8.4 (47.1)	14.3 (57.7)
Daily mean °C (°F)	5.7 (42.3)	6.0 (42.8)	8.1 (46.6)	10.4 (50.7)	13.3 (55.9)	16.0 (60.8)	18.0 (64.4)	18.4 (65.1)	16.4 (61.5)	13.1 (55.6)	9.3 (48.7)	6.5 (43.7)	11.8 (53.2)
Mean daily minimum °C (°F)	3.9 (39.0)	3.9 (39.0)	5.6 (42.1)	7.5 (45.5)	10.3 (50.5)	13.1 (55.6)	15.1 (59.2)	15.6 (60.1)	13.7 (56.7)	10.8 (51.4)	7.4 (45.3)	4.7 (40.5)	9.3 (48.7)
Record low °C (°F)	−13.8 (7.2)	−12.5 (9.5)	−7.8 (18.0)	−1.0 (30.2)	1.2 (34.2)	4.4 (39.9)	8.0 (46.4)	8.4 (47.1)	3.3 (37.9)	−0.2 (31.6)	−8.5 (16.7)	−8.6 (16.5)	−13.8 (7.2)
Average precipitation mm (inches)	67.5 (2.66)	53.7 (2.11)	52.5 (2.07)	52.3 (2.06)	56.5 (2.22)	58.0 (2.28)	48.7 (1.92)	66.0 (2.60)	65.4 (2.57)	86.2 (3.39)	87.5 (3.44)	95.5 (3.76)	789.8 (31.09)
Average precipitation days (≥ 1.0 mm)	12.4	11.2	10.1	9.6	9.0	8.6	7.8	9.2	9.1	12.4	13.5	14.7	127.7
Source: Météo-France

== Heraldry ==
Arms of Sainte-Adresse	The Arms of Sainte-Adresse are blazoned : Quarterly, 1 and 4, azure a tower argent masoned sable, 2 and 3 gules an escallop Or; a cross Or surmounted by an inescutcheon tierced in pale sable, Or and gules.

== Population ==
Historical population
Year	Pop.	±% p.a.
1968	8,261	—
1975	8,754	+0.83%
1982	8,029	−1.23%
1990	8,047	+0.03%
1999	7,883	−0.23%
2007	7,731	−0.24%
2012	7,426	−0.80%
2017	7,389	−0.10%
2023	7,004	−0.89%
Source: INSEE

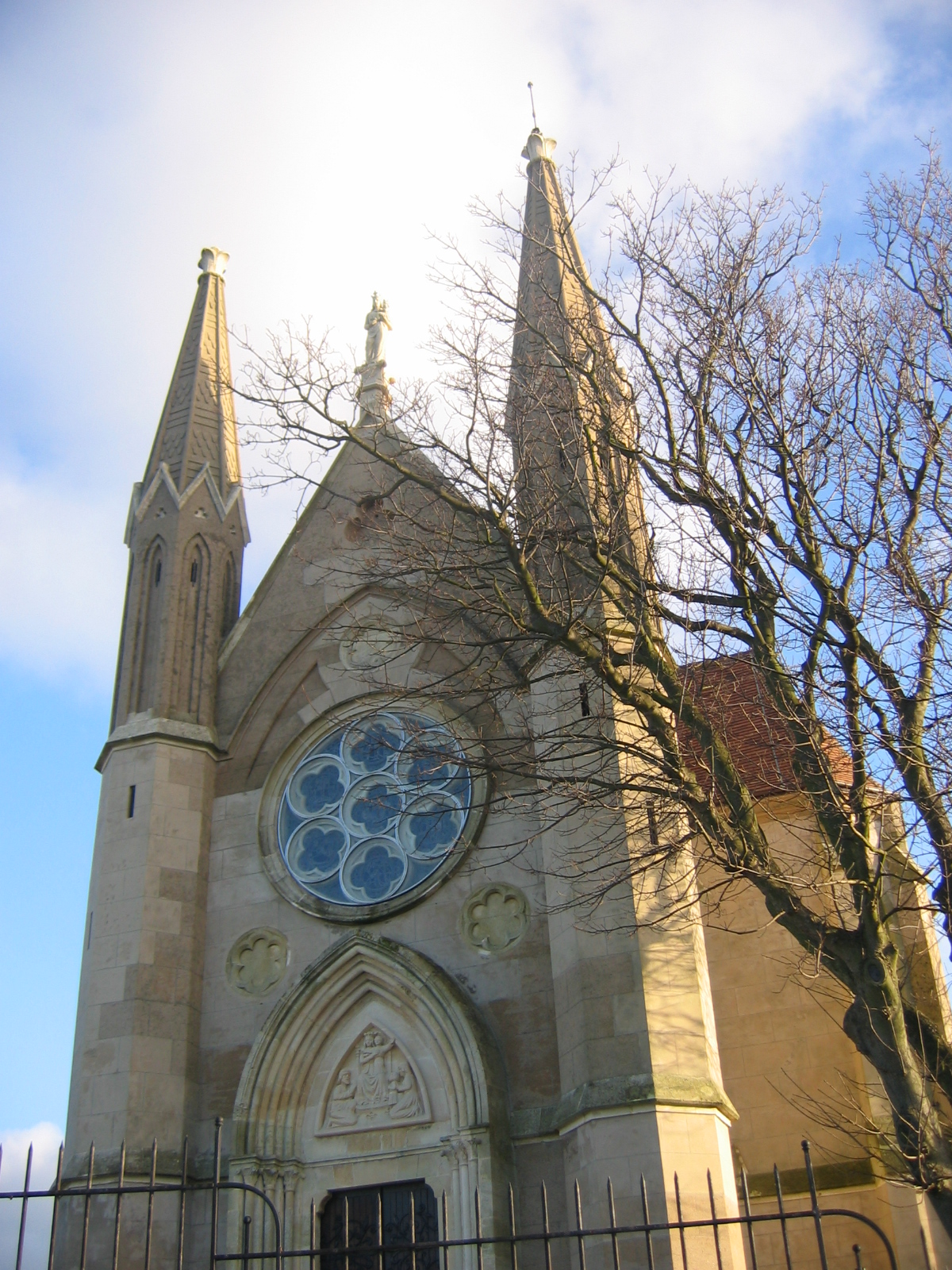
The chapel of Notre-Dame-des-flots

== History ==
The oldest known name of the commune was "Caput Caleti" mentioned in 1240. It was later known as Saint-Denis-Chef-de-Caux, after an ancient place of worship and its position on the cape. In 1415, Henry V of England landed with his fleet here to claim the throne of France.

In 1905, Georges Dufayel, a Parisian businessman, created a residential seaside resort known as Nice havrais (the "Nice of Le Havre"), at Sainte Adresse. The local architect Ernest Daniel directed operations. Avenue de Regatta, on the waterfront, is designed in the image of Promenade des Anglais, in Nice.

During World War I, Sainte-Adresse was the administrative capital of Belgium. The Belgian government-in-exile was installed from October 1914 to November 1918 in the Dufayel Building, named after the businessman, who had built it in 1911. The building had at its disposal a post office that used Belgian postage stamps. As a result, the centre of the town's seal has the Belgian flag.

During World War II, the Germans built several fortifications here for the Atlantic Wall to defend the port of Le Havre.

== Places of interest ==
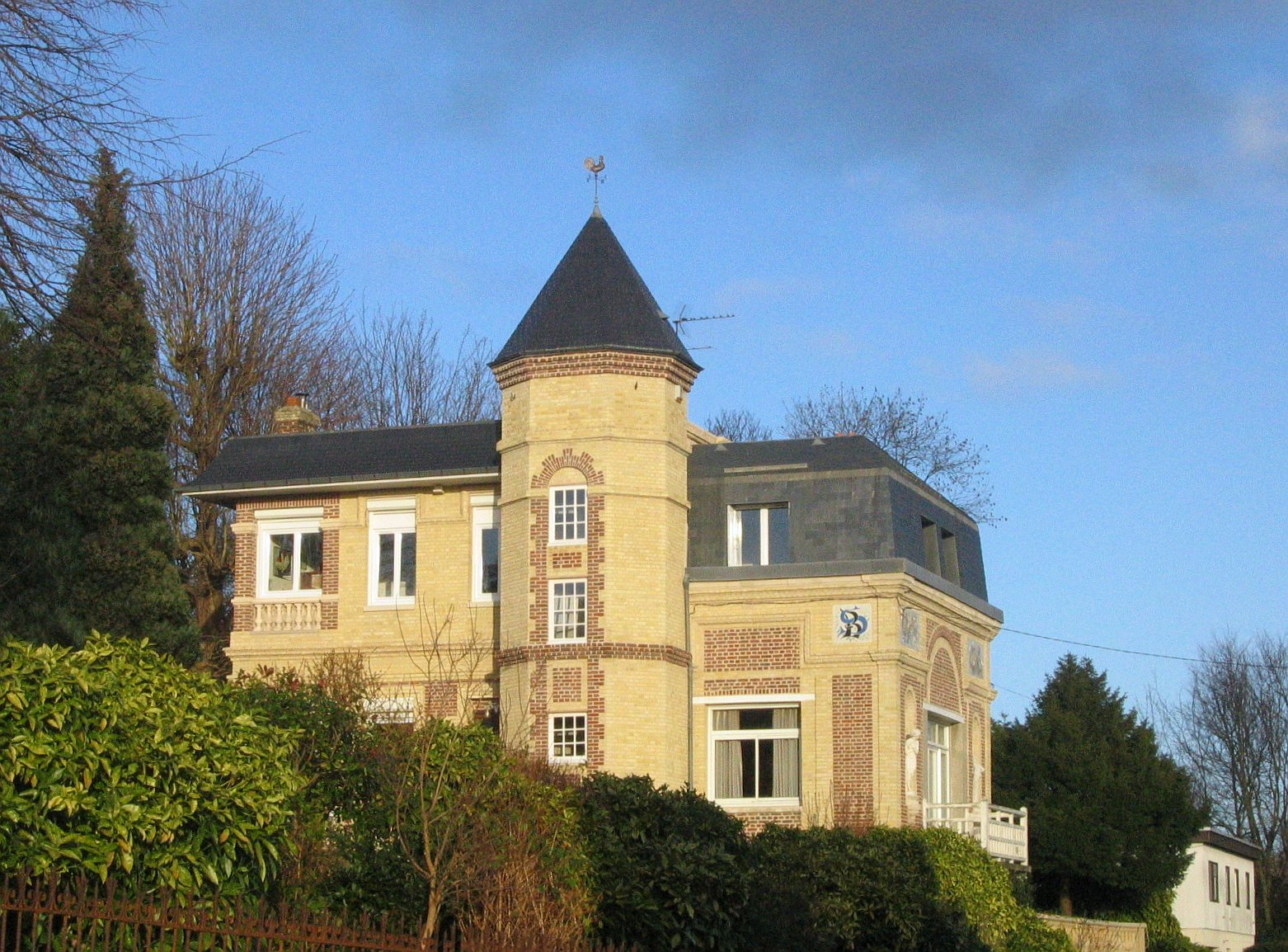
Sarah Bernhardt's villa

- The church of St. Denis, dating from the nineteenth century.
- The de la Hève lighthouse
- A fifteenth-century manorhouse
- The chapel of Notre-Dame-des-Flots built in 1857
- The Pain de sucre, a mausoleum in memory of General Charles Lefebvre-Desnouëttes by his widow Stephanie Rollier, a cousin of Napoleon.
- The villa of Sarah Bernhardt

== Paintings ==
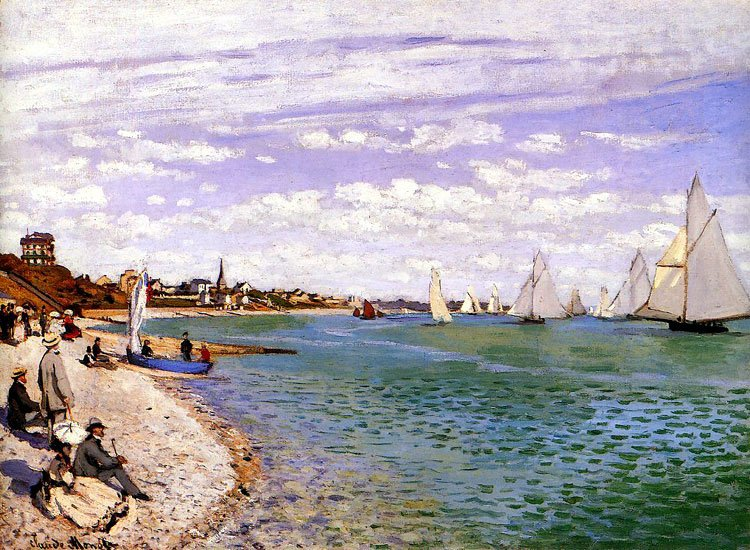
Régates à Sainte-Adresse by Claude Monet

- Claude Monet, La pointe de la Hève, Sainte-Adresse, 1864, National Gallery, London
- Claude Monet, La Pointe de la Hève à marée basse, 1865, 90.2 × 150.5 cm, Kimbell Art Museum, Fort Worth, Texas.
- Claude Monet, Jardin à Sainte-Adresse, 1867, 98.1 cm × 129.9 cm, Metropolitan Museum of Art, New York.
- Claude Monet, La plage de Sainte-Adresse, 1867, Art Institute of Chicago
- Claude Monet, La côte de Sainte-Adresse
- Claude Monet, La mer à Sainte-Adresse
- Claude Monet, Promenade sur les falaises de Sainte-Adresse
- Claude Monet, Régates à Sainte-Adresse, 1867, Metropolitan Museum of Art, New York.
- Claude Monet, Les cabanes à Sainte-Adresse, 1868
- Claude Monet, Rue à Sainte-Adresse
- Claude Monet, La falaise de Sainte-Adresse
- Claude Monet, Sainte-Adresse, bateau à voile échoué
- Claude Monet, Sainte-Adresse
- Claude Monet, Sainte-Adresse, bateaux de pêche sur le rivage
- Jean-Baptiste-Camille Corot, Maison de pêcheurs à Sainte-Adresse, entre 1830 et 1840, Musée du Louvre, Paris
- Raoul Dufy, La plage de Sainte Adresse, 1902
- Alfred Stevens, La Villa des Falaises à Sainte-Adresse, 1884

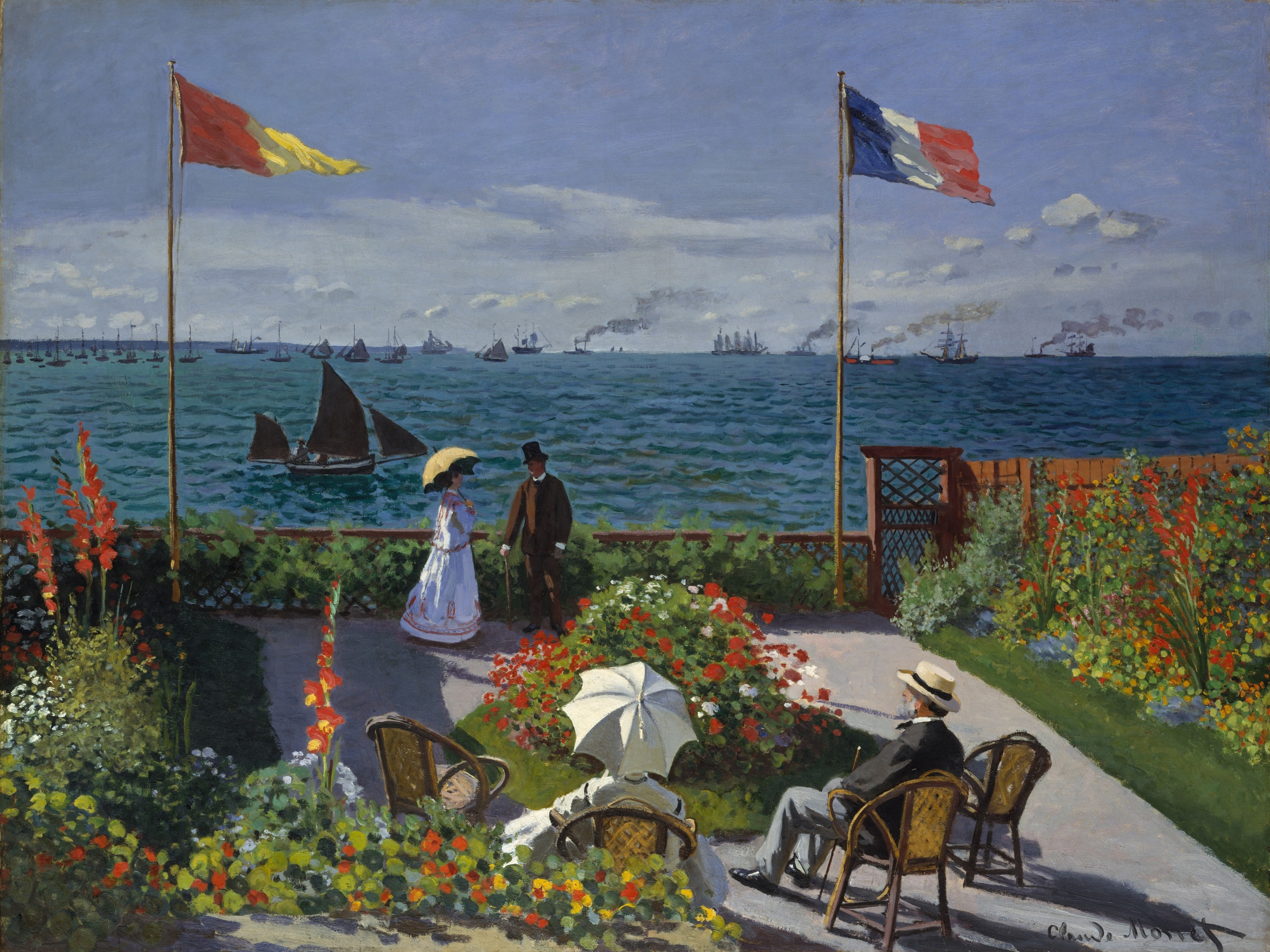
Jardin à Sainte-Adresse by Claude Monet

== People ==
- Flavien Belson (born 1987), footballer
- Fanny Dombre-Coste (born 1956), politician
- Claudine Loquen (1965–), French painter
- Sarah Bernhardt, actress, built a property here in the late nineteenth century
- Caroline Ducey (born 1976), actress, born to a marine pilot and a science teacher here in 1977
- Georges Dufayel, Parisian businessman who built the "Nice havrais" resort and the building that still bears his name
- Henri de Gaulle and his wife Jeanne, parents of Charles de Gaulle, are buried here
- Alphonse Karr, director of Figaro, launches the first resort in 1841
- Prosper Mérimée located the action of his story at Sainte-Adresse
- Claude Monet has painted numerous paintings of the city

== See also ==
- Communes of the Seine-Maritime department
