= Daniel Paul =

French politician (1943–2023)

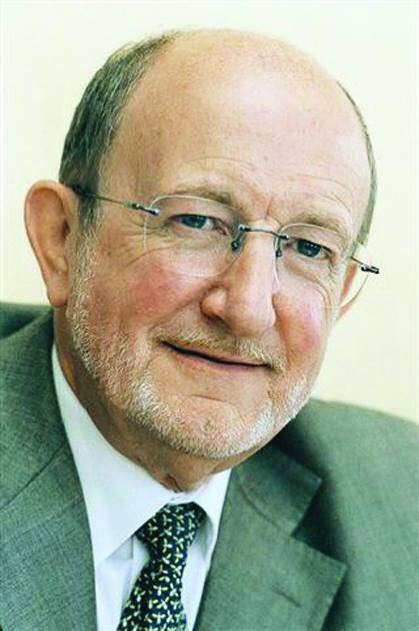

Member of the National Assembly for Seine-Maritime's 8th constituency
- In office 12 June 1997 – 17 June 2012
- Preceded by: Daniel Colliard
- Succeeded by: Catherine Troallic

Personal details
- Born: 16 August 1943 Plourivo, Brittany, German-occupied France
- Died: 16 May 2023 (aged 79) Montivilliers, Seine-Maritime, France
- Party: French Communist Party
- Profession: Teacher

Daniel Paul (16 August 1943 – 16 May 2023) was a French politician who was a member of the National Assembly of France. He represented Seine-Maritime's 8th constituency, and was a member of the Gauche démocrate et républicaine. Paul died on 16 May 2023, at the age of 79.

== Biography ==
Daniel Paul was born in 1943 in Plourivo (Côtes-du-Nord) into a modest family. His father was a merchant seaman and member of the General Confederation of Labor (CGT); his mother ran a small farm and was an activist in the Femmes solidaires (UFF).

Trained at the École normale de Saint-Brieuc, he became a teacher in 1964 and worked in Le Havre (Bléville district) after moving to the city in 1967.

A member of the French Communist Party since 1962, he won his first elected office in 1977, becoming deputy mayor of Le Havre. He remained a member of the city council for 37 consecutive years, during which time he was twice unsuccessful in his bid for mayor, in the 2001 and 2008 municipal elections, when he headed the PCF lists. Shortly after being re-elected, he resigned from the city council on April 2, 2014.

As a municipal representative, he was particularly committed to the creation of the Le Havre Normandy University, which was founded in 1984, to supporting workers at the Le Havre shipyards, which closed in the late 1990s, and to working with the Renault Sandouville unions to defend jobs at the site.

Daniel Paul succeeded Daniel Colliard when he was elected representative of the 8th district of Seine-Maritime on June 1, 1997. He was re-elected in 2002 and 2007. In the National Assembly, he worked in particular on energy, transport, and industrial policy issues, as well as those concerning disability. He also chaired the parliamentary commission of inquiry into the sinking of the MV Erika and was rapporteur for the commission on public financial aid received by large industrial and financial groups.

After retiring from political life, he remains involved in community work alongside his wife, who is a teacher by profession. Both are involved with Secours Populaire Français and an association that helps people with disabilities.

In 2020, he published his memoirs entitled Pour un monde meilleur (For a Better World), with a preface by André Chassaigne, president of the Democratic and Republican Left group in the National Assembly.

He died on May 16, 2023, in Montivilliers (Seine-Maritime) at the age of 79, three months before his 80th birthday.
