= Claudine Loquen =

French painter and sculptor

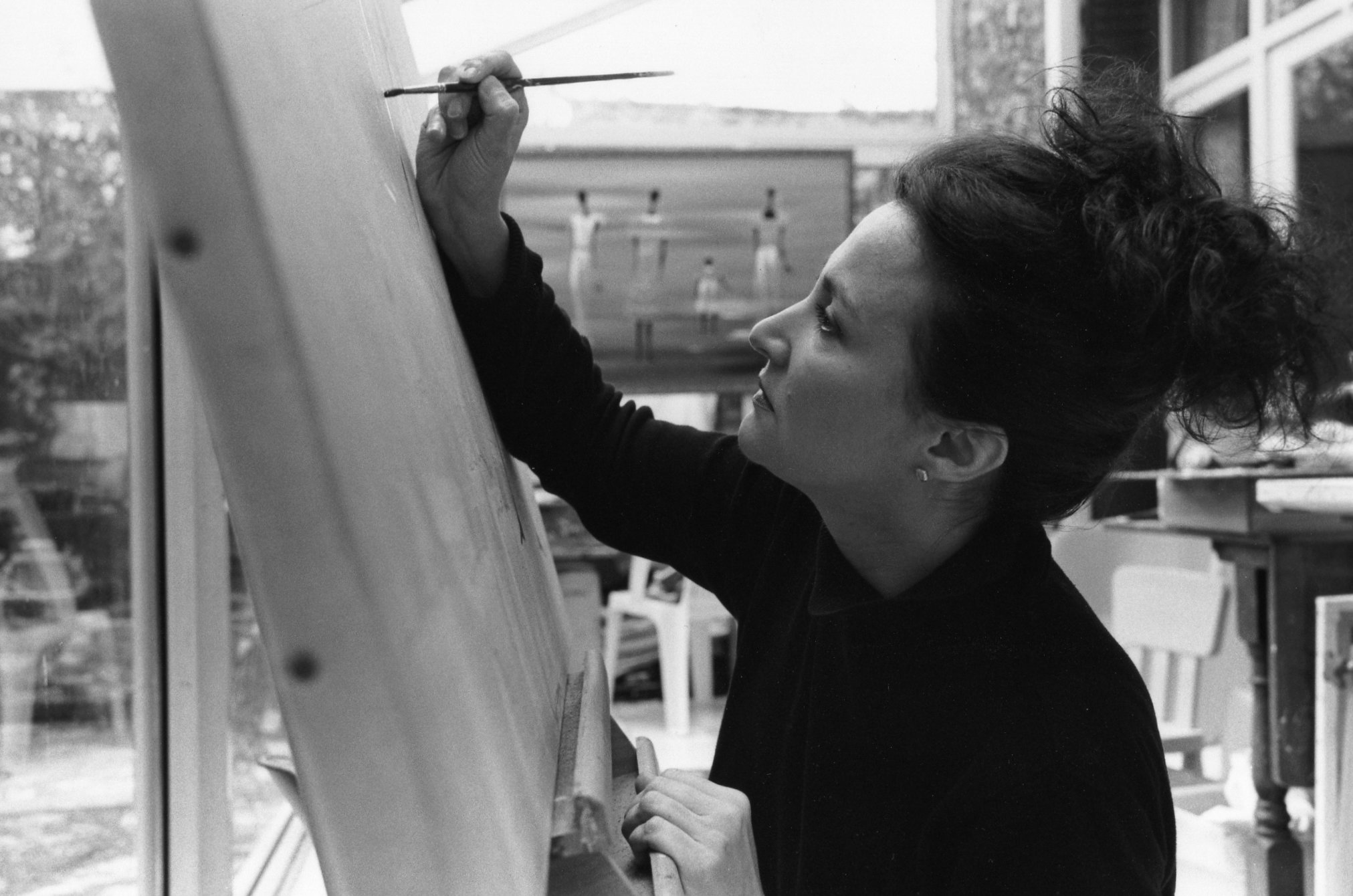
- Loquen in 2018
- Born: 22 February 1965 (age 61); Sainte-Adresse (Seine Maritime), France
- Known for: Painting, sculpting, drawing
- Movement: Naïve art, outsider art
- Awards: Jean Anouilh award; Naive Art award

Claudine Marie Claire Loquen (born 1965), known as Claudine Loquen [Klodin loʊkən], is a French painter in the naïve style.

Several of her works are held in French and foreign museums (Musée Daubigny in Auvers-sur-Oise, Musée international d'art naïf in Magog, Musée d'art spontané in Brussels).

== Biography ==
=== Early life ===
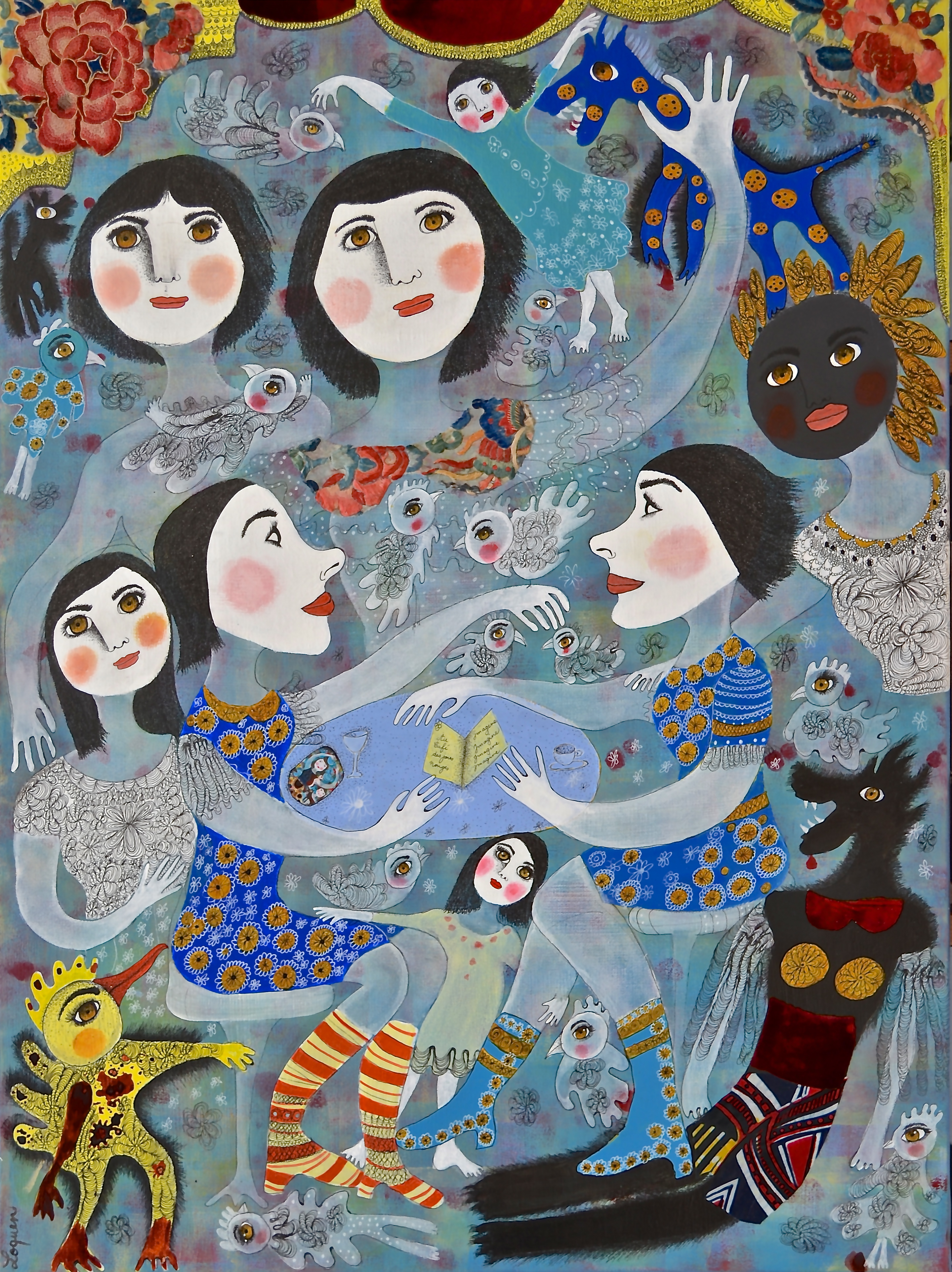
Au café des joues rouges – Claudine Loquen

Loquen is born in Sainte-Adresse (Normandy) on 22 February 1965. She studied at the Ecole des Beaux Arts of Le Havre.

=== Career ===
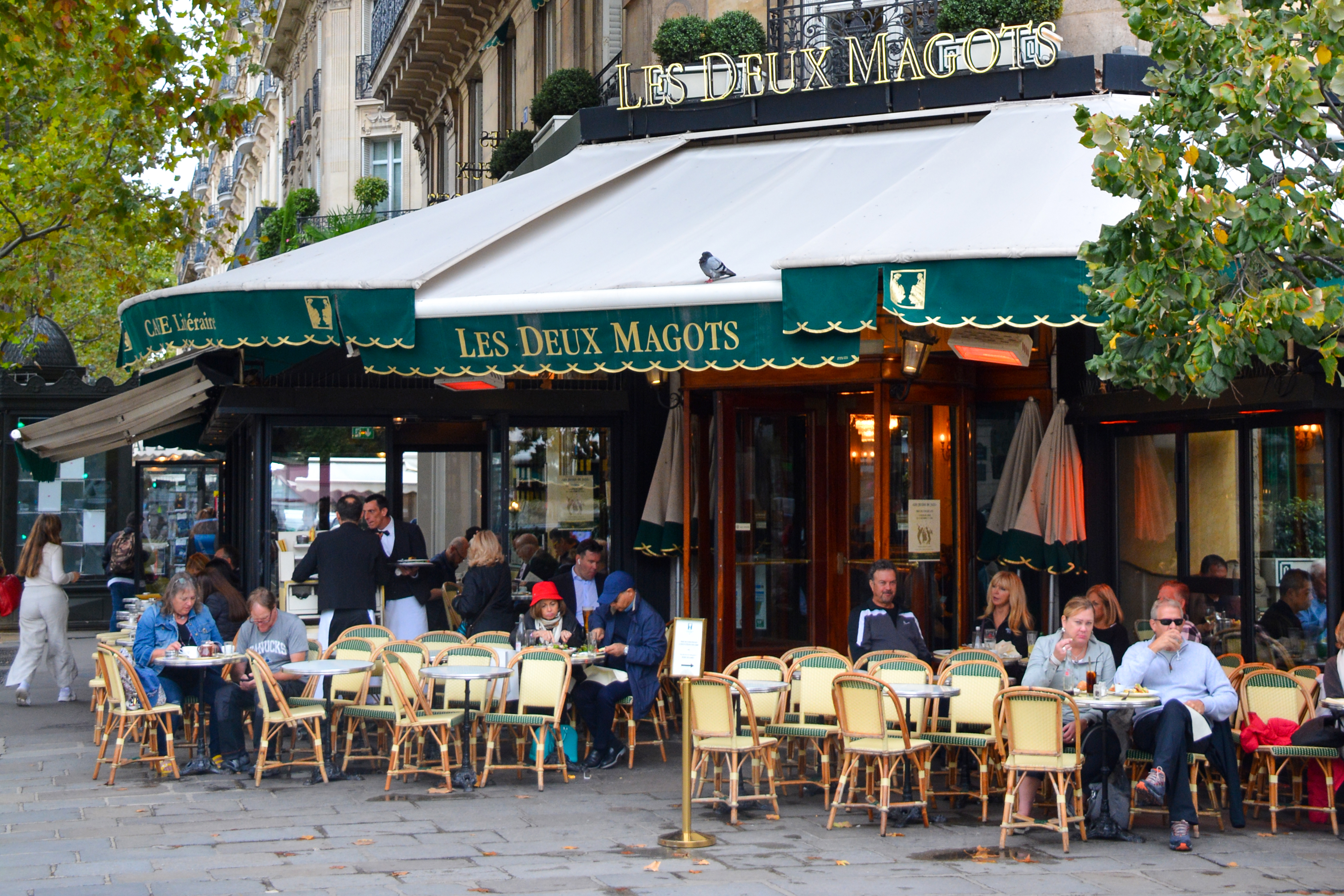
Les Deux Magots

In 2003, her first exhibition took place in Café Les Deux Magots in Paris.

Colombe Anouilh, on 8 December 2014, awarded her the Jean Anouilh prize for her work on canvas Young women with wolves (Jeunes filles aux loups) presented at the Salon d'automne, in Paris. In 2021, still at the Salon d'Automne, she was awarded the Naive Art prize for a painting In the shadow of the flowering maidens (A l'ombre des jeunes filles en fleurs).

From 2021, she presides over the Naive Art section at the Salon d'automne in Paris, bringing together some twenty artists from the naive art movement.

=== Themes ===
Loquen mainly paints women and historical figures, drawing her inspiration from literature, history, poetry and fairytales. She has made the wolf her animal symbol. Gemellity and sorority are also recurring themes in her work.

== Selected exhibitions ==
=== Solo exhibitions ===
- 2024 : One upon a time, University of Rouen Normandy, Mont-Saint-Aignan, France
- 2023 : Sisters...and stories, Centre Culturel Jean-Pierre Fabrègue, Saint-Yrieix-la-Perche, France
- 2021 : Wolves, Les peintres du Marais Galery, Paris
- 2019 : La maison de l'Etang, Louveciennes, France
- 2019 : The ladies of the Andelys, Musée Nicolas Poussin, Les Andelys, France
- From 2018 to 2023 : Galery Rollin, Rouen, France
- 2016 : As long as there are wolves, Museum of Spontaneous Art, Brussels, Belgium
- 2011 : Singular portraits, Sénat, Pavillon Davioud, Le Jardin du Luxembourg, Paris
- 2003 : Café Les Deux Magots, Paris

=== Paris salons ===
- 2025 : Biennale 109, Bastille Design Center, Paris, France
- 2025 : Salon d'Automne, Place de la Concorde, Paris, France
- 2024 : Salon Figuration Critique, Bastille Design Center, Paris, France
- 2019 : Société Nationale des Beaux-Arts, Carrousel du Louvre, Paris, France
- From 2017 to 2025 : Salon Comparaisons, Grand Palais, Paris, France
- From 2015 to 2016 : Salon des artistes Français, Grand Palais, Paris, France
- From 2010 to 2019, 2024 : Salon d'Automne, Champs-Élysées, Paris, France
- 2021, 2022 : Salon d'Automne, Grande Halle de la Villette, Paris, France

=== Group exhibitions ===
- 2025 : The spring of the naive, La halle aux blés, Saint-Flour, France
- 2023 : Edith Stein Museum, Amplitude project, Salon d'Automne, Lubiniec, Poland
- 2023 : Masta Jaworzna Museum, Amplitude project, Salon d'Automne, Jaworzno, Poland
- 2023 : International Museum of Naive Art of Magog, If I were told the story of France..., Canada
- 2022 : The National Art center Museum, Salon d'automne, Tokyo, Japon
- 2019 : International Children's Art Museum, Salon d'automne, Xi'an, China
- 2016 : National Art center Museum, Salon d'automne à Tokyo, Japon
- 2016 : International Museum of Naive Art of Magog, Imaginaïves, Canada
- 2012 : Hainan Museum, Salon d'automne, Haikou, China
- 2011 : Museum of Spontaneous Art, Evere, Belgium

== See also ==
- Outsider art

== Bibliography ==
- Frédérique-Anne Oudin (preface), 2020, Les oubliées, Tome 1, éditions La Grisette, 36 p ISBN 978-2-9557039-1-5
- Luis Porquet (preface) 2018, Loquen, 18 p ISBN 978-2-9557039-9-1
- Jean-Paul Gavard-Perret, (preface), 2011, Claudine Loquen, Portraits singuliers. Paris : éditions Lelivredart, 28 p
- HeleneCaroline Fournier, (preface), 2011, Sénat, Portraits singuliers, Claudine Loquen. Québec : Art Total Multimédia, 20 p ISBN 978-2-923622-11-8
- IIeana Cornea, (preface), textes de Sylvie Loquen, 2008, Claudine Loquen. éditions Lelivredart, 40 p ISBN 9782355320187
- HeleneCaroline Fournier, (preface), 2008, Claudine Loquen. Québec : Art Total Multimedia
- Jean-Louis Redval (preface), 2004, Loquen, éditions Sémios, 44 p
