= Catène de Containers =

Coordinates: 49°29′06″N 0°06′26″E

Catène de Containers is a sculpture by French artist Vincent Ganivet.

== Description ==
On 27 May 2017, the French port city of Le Havre celebrated its 500th anniversary. For the celebrations, artistic director Jean Blaise organised the art exhibition Un été au Havre; France Info described Catène de Containers as the "most spectacular". The sculpture consists of 36 shipping containers arranged in two arches, the smaller reaching 15 metres in height and the larger reaching 29 metres.

A catenary is the curve of a hanging chain held between two ends. A catenary arch is shaped in the inverse of a catenary. The 288-ton sculpture stands without pillars or wires due to this arch, on which the containers rest in points ensuring that there are no weak spots. The same technique was used by Antoni Gaudí for the vaults of the Sagrada Familia in Barcelona.

== Copyright ==
In France, artists retain copyright of their works for their entire life and 70 years after their death, even if those works are permanently displayed in a public place. The commercial or promotional use of photographs of Catène de Containers is only permitted with permission from Ganivet or the artistic rights group ADAGP. After being approached by associates of Ganivet, a local kickboxing club had to withdraw promotional flyers with the sculpture in the background. During the 2026 French municipal elections, the National Rally and the party Horizons of mayor Édouard Philippe used the image in electoral material without authorisation; Ganivet initiated legal action which would not conclude until after the election, and called for all other candidates to use the image so that the election could be fair and democratic.
