= Honorine Dossou Naki =

Gabonese politician and diplomat

Honorine Dossou Naki (born 14 March 1946) is a Gabonese politician and diplomat. She was Gabon's Ambassador to France from 1994 to 2002 and subsequently served in the Gabonese government from 2002 to 2009.

== Political and diplomatic career ==
A member of the Myene ethnic group, Dossou Naki was born in Port-Gentil, where she also attended primary school; she subsequently attended secondary school in Libreville. She was appointed to the Ministry of Foreign Affairs as its Director of Cooperation and Deputy Secretary-General in January 1975, and she was Deputy Director of the Cabinet of President Omar Bongo from March 1976 to February 1980. Subsequently, she served in the government as Secretary of State under the Minister of Foreign Affairs and Cooperation from 1980 to 1990 and was Adviser to the President for International Relations from 1990 to 1994. Dossou Naki was then appointed as Gabon's Ambassador to France, the United Kingdom, and Switzerland. She presented her credentials as Ambassador to France on 7 December 1994, remaining in that post until 2002.

In the December 2001 parliamentary election, Dossou Naki was elected to the National Assembly as a candidate of the Gabonese Democratic Party (PDG) in Ogooué-Maritime Province. Following the election, she was appointed to the government as Minister of Justice on 27 January 2002. In the December 2006 parliamentary election, she was again elected to the National Assembly as the PDG candidate from the second seat in Bendje/Port-Gentil Department. She was then moved to the position of Minister of the Merchant Marine and Port Facilities on 25 January 2007 before being again moved to the position of Minister of State Control, Inspections, the Fight Against Corruption and the Fight Against Illicit Enrichment. On 7 October 2008, she was promoted to the rank of Deputy Prime Minister, while retaining the same ministerial portfolio.

President Bongo died in June 2009. After Bongo's son, Ali Bongo Ondimba, won the 30 August 2009 presidential election, Naki was removed from her post as Deputy Prime Minister and instead appointed as High Representative in charge of the Mandji Island Free Zone, a post at the Presidency of the Republic, on 17 October 2009.

== Personal life ==
Dossou Naki is married to Samuel Dossou-Aworet, who was born in Cotonou but later became a naturalized citizen of Gabon and held various high-ranking positions; he was Omar Bongo's oil adviser for a time. After marriage, she continued to use her maiden name of Naki, in conjunction with her married name of Dossou. Dossou Naki and her husband have six children.
