= Regatta at Sainte-Adresse (Monet) =

1867 painting by Claude Monet

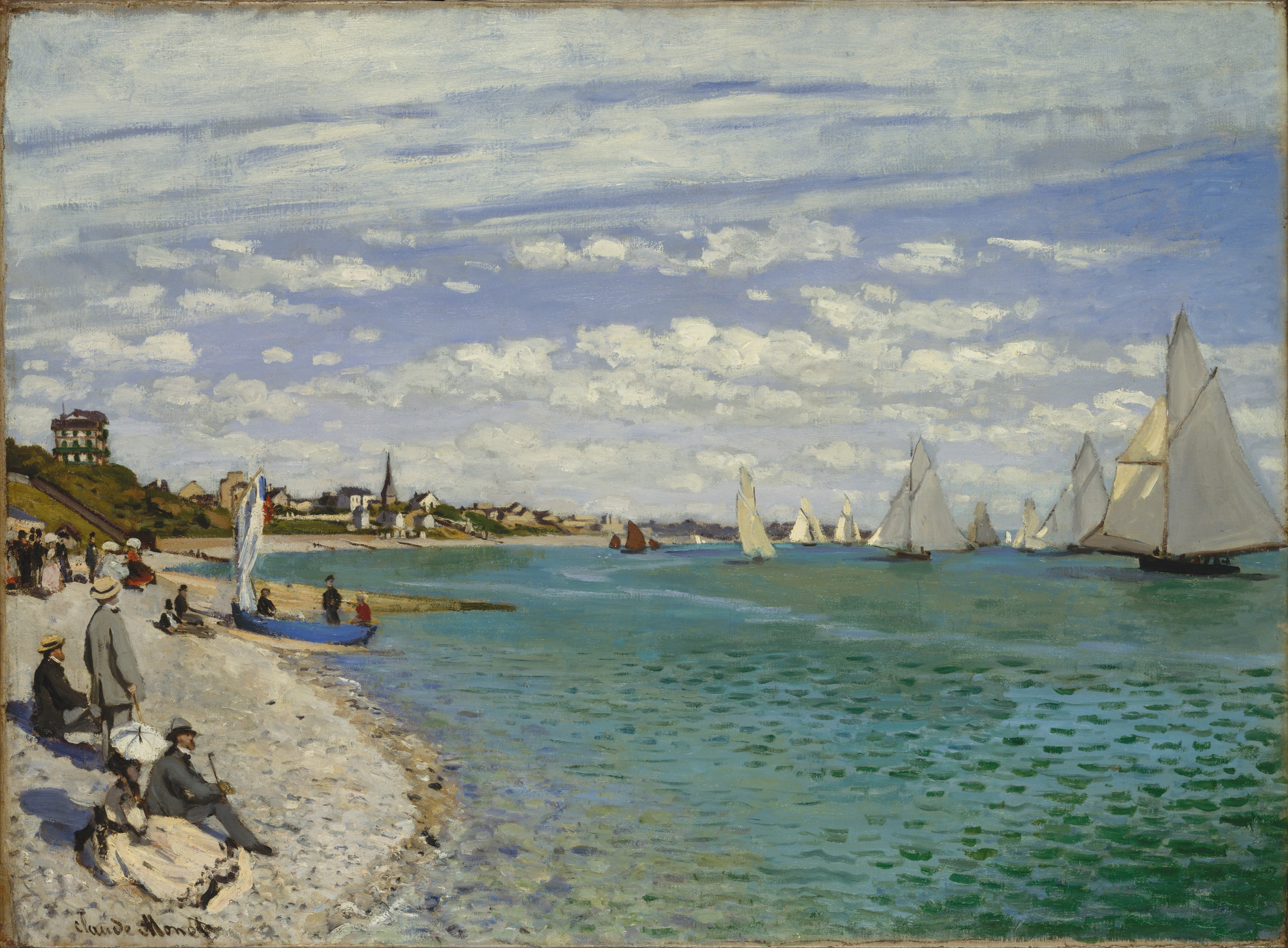
- Artist: Claude Monet
- Year: 1867
- Medium: oil paint, canvas
- Dimensions: 75.2 cm (29.6 in) × 101.6 cm (40.0 in)
- Location: Metropolitan Museum of Art
- Accession: 51.30.4

The Regatta at Sainte-Adresse is an oil-on-canvas painting by the impressionist painter Claude Monet. It was painted in 1867 and is owned by the Metropolitan Museum of Art.

This painting and The Beach at Sainte-Adresse (Art Institute of Chicago) were probably conceived as a pair. They are identical in size, and their viewing point differs by only a few yards.

== Description ==
Sainte-Adresse, the well-to-do suburb of Le Havre, was the home of Monet's father. Destitute, Monet spent the summer of 1867 with his father and aunt Sophie Lecadre at the cost of abandoning his companion, Camille Doncieux, and their newborn son, Jean. Monet attended the birth in Paris and returned to the coast a few days later.

The pair of paintings juxtaposes this sunny regatta watched at high tide by well dressed bourgeois, with an overcast scene at low tide, fishing boats hauled onto the beach peopled with sailors and workers. Since Monet never exhibited the paintings side by side, the contrast between them was probably not intended as a social manifesto but instead reflected differing conditions under which the same place could be painted.

On 25 June 1867, Monet reported that he was working on about twenty pictures:

"Among the seascapes, I am doing the regattas of Le Havre with many figures on the beach and the outer harbor covered with small sails." (Claude Monet)

The painting is signed at the lower left.

== Provenance ==
?Henri Hecht, Paris (1873; bought in January for Fr 500 from the artist); ?sale, Hôtel Drouot, Paris, April 5, 1884, no. 25, as "Sainte-Adresse"; [Durand-Ruel, Paris, about 1888–91, sold on August 20, 1891 to Widener]; P. A. B. Widener, Ashbourne, near Philadelphia (1891–1907; sold on February 27, 1907 to Durand-Ruel); [Durand-Ruel, New York, 1907]; William Church Osborn, New York (1907–d. 1951)

== Selected exhibitions ==
- Galerie de la société des amis des arts de Bordeaux. "Salon des amis des arts de Bordeaux," 1868, no. 449 (as "Les régates du Havre," possibly this picture) [see Wildenstein 1996, vol. 2].
- London. Durand-Ruel. "Society of French Artists: Eighth Exhibition," Spring 1874, no. 142 (as "Ste Adresse near Havre," possibly this picture).
- New York. The Metropolitan Museum of Art. "Loan Exhibition of Impressionist and Post-Impressionist Paintings," May 3–September 15, 1921, no. 76 (as "Plage de Sainte Adresse," lent by William Church Osborn).
- New York. Durand-Ruel. "Loan Exhibition of French Masterpieces of the Late XIX Century," March 20–April 10, 1928, no. 12 (as "Ste. Adresse," lent anonymously).
- New York. Durand-Ruel. "Exhibition of Masterpieces by Claude Monet Commemorating the Hundred and Thirtieth Anniversary of the House of Durand-Ruel 1803-1933," March 20–April 15, 1933, no. 12 (as "La plage de Ste. Adresse," 1869, lent by a private collection).
- San Francisco. Palace of Fine Arts. "Golden Gate International Exposition," 1940, no. 284 (lent by William Church Osborn).
- New York. Wildenstein. "A Loan Exhibition of Paintings by Claude Monet for the Benefit of the Children of Giverny," April 11–May 12, 1945, no. 4 (as "La Plage de Sainte Adresse," c. 1865, lent by William Church Osborn).
- New York. The Metropolitan Museum of Art. "The Painter's Light," October 5–November 10, 1971, no. 29.
- Paris. Grand Palais. "Hommage à Claude Monet (1840-1926)," February 8–May 5, 1980, no. 16 (as "Les régates à Sainte-Adresse").
- New York. The Metropolitan Museum of Art. "Origins of Impressionism," September 27, 1994 – January 8, 1995, no. 135.
- Art Institute of Chicago. "Claude Monet, 1840–1926," July 22–November 26, 1995, no. 13.
- Moscow. State Pushkin Museum. "Claude Monet," November 26, 2001 – February 10, 2002, no. 4 (as "Les Régates à Saint-Adresse" [sic]).
- St. Petersburg. State Hermitage Museum. "Claude Monet," March 1–May 15, 2002, no. 4 (as "Les Régates à Saint-Adresse" [sic]).
- Fine Arts Museums of San Francisco. "Monet in Normandy," June 17–September 17, 2006, no. 4.
- Cleveland Museum of Art. "Monet in Normandy," February 18–May 20, 2007, no. 4.
- London. Royal Academy of Arts. "Impressionists by the Sea," July 7–September 30, 2007, no. 33.
- Hartford. Wadsworth Atheneum Museum of Art. "Impressionists by the Sea," February 9–May 11, 2008, no. 33.

== See also ==
- List of paintings by Claude Monet
