= Myriam Dossou D'Almeida =

Myriam Dossou-d'Almeida
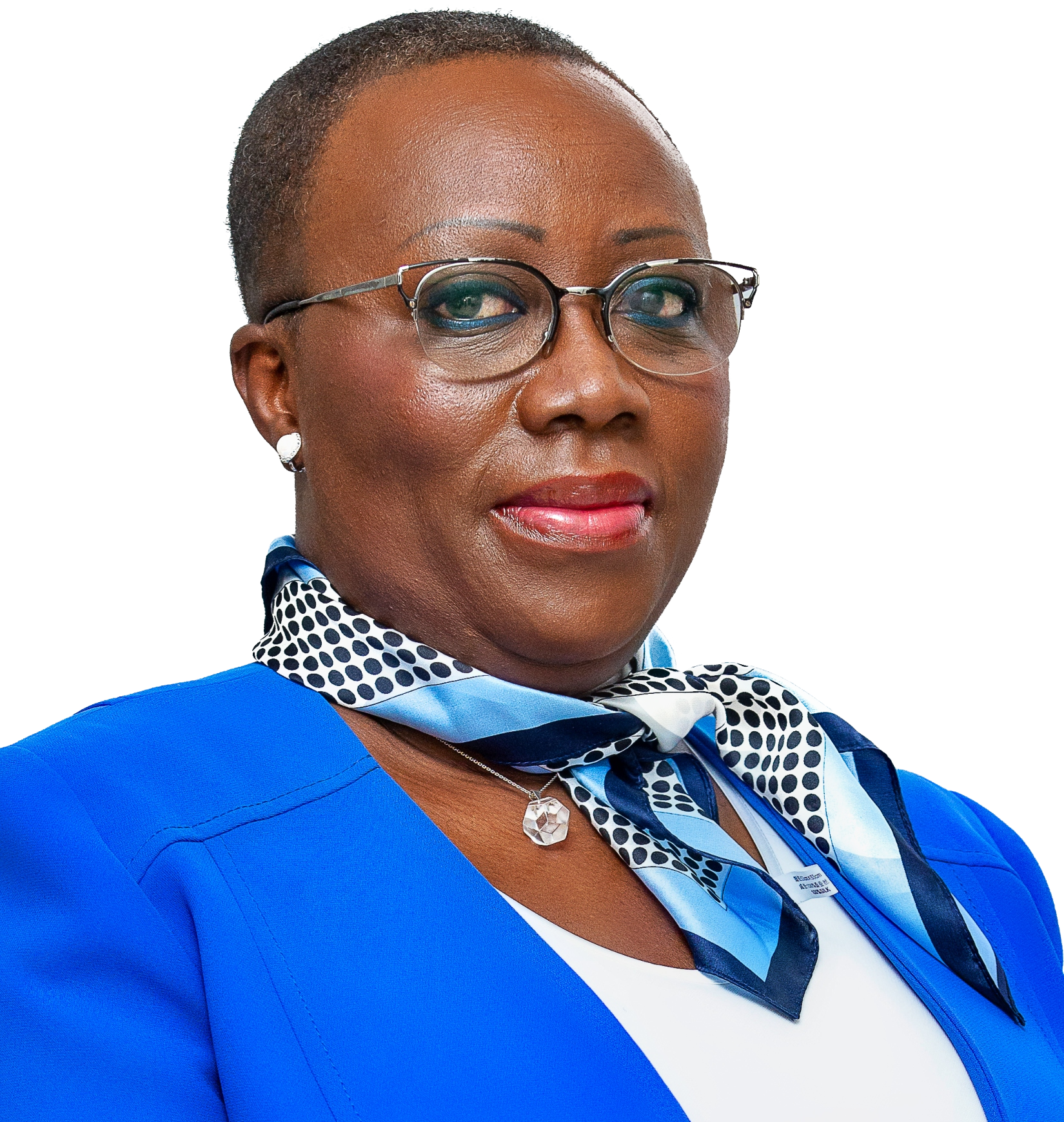

6th Vice-President of the National Assembly of Togo
- Incumbent
- Assumed office 14 June 2024

Minister of Grassroots Development, Youth, and Youth Employment
- In office October 1, 2020 – August 20, 2024
- President: Faure Gnassingbé
- Prime Minister: Victoire Tomegah Dogbé
- Preceded by: Victoire Tomegah Dogbé
- Succeeded by: Mazamesso Assih

Director General of the National Health Insurance Institute
- In office February 2012 – October 2024
- Preceded by: Office established
- Succeeded by: Justin Pilante

Personal details
- Born: Myriam Dossou D'Almeida; May 27, 1967 (age 59) Lomé, Togo
- Party: UNIR

Myriam Dossou de Souza-D'Almeida (born May 27, 1967, in Lomé) is a Togolese politician who has served as the sixth Vice-President of the National Assembly of Togo since June 2024. She was Minister of Grassroots Development, Youth, and Youth Employment from October 2020 to August 2024 in the Government of Victoire Tomegah Dogbé. She is specialized in insurance and reinsurance.

== Biography ==
=== Education ===
Myriam Dossou D'Almeida began her studies at the Protestant College of Lomé and obtained her Baccalauréat in 1985 at Tokoin High School in Lomé. She started studying pharmacy at the University of Reims-Champagne-Ardenne but did not complete her degree. She then turned to insurance and joined the École nationale d'assurances (Paris), where she graduated with a Master of Business Administration (MBA) in 2005. She taught there from 2008 to 2014. She also graduated from the African Insurance Institute in Tunis.

=== Insurance career ===
Throughout her career, De Souza-D'Almeida worked for several insurance companies, including GTA-C2A IARD, the broker Marsh France and the New Inter-African Insurance Company. She also worked in reinsurance, notably at AXA in the Sub-Saharan Africa and Maghreb departments, and later as Director of Reinsurance for the NSIA group.

She was Director General of the National Health Insurance Institute (INAM) from February 2012 to October 2024. During these twelve years, she implemented several projects, including universities for the elderly and extending health insurance to market women, students, and journalists. Her economic management of the institute was heavily criticized following an audit by the state inspector general, confirming reports from an internal audit in December 2018. She was also accused of double spending. She handed over to Justin Pilante in October 2024.

=== Political career ===
She succeeded Victoire Tomegah Dogbé as Minister of Grassroots Development and Youth when the latter became prime minister. As minister she focused on promoting youth entrepreneurship and combating substance abuse. Her term saw a significant increase in the creation of micro-enterprises among the youth.

Elected to the National Assembly following the April 2024 legislative elections, she took office on June 14, 2024, as sixth Vice-President of the Assembly's bureau. She left the government on August 20, 2024, when a new cabinet was appointed under the constitution of May 6, 2024, and was succeeded at the ministry by Mazamesso Assih; the handover took place on August 22, 2024.
