= Antoine Rufenacht =

French politician (1939–2020)

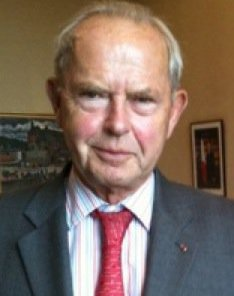
- Antoine Rufenacht in 2010

Mayor of Le Havre
- In office 23 June 1995 – 24 October 2010
- Preceded by: Daniel Colliard
- Succeeded by: Édouard Philippe

President of the Regional Council of Upper Normandy
- In office 27 March 1992 – 20 March 1998
- Preceded by: Roger Fossé
- Succeeded by: Alain Le Vern

Personal details
- Born: 11 May 1939 Le Havre, France
- Died: 5 September 2020 (aged 81) Le Havre, France
- Party: RPR; UMP; The Republicans
- Education: ÉNA

Antoine Rufenacht (French pronunciation: [ɑ̃twan ʁyfnak]; 11 May 1939 – 5 September 2020) was a French right-wing (The Republicans) politician and former mayor of Le Havre.

He took the mayoral seat from Daniel Colliard (PCF) at the municipal election of 1995 and was reelected both in 2001, with a comfortable majority, and in 2008, against Daniel Paul (also PCF). He was also president of the local city community (called Communauté d'Agglomération Havraise - CODAH) which groups several municipalities around Le Havre,

Rufenacht was born in Le Havre. A former student of ÉNA, he was a junior minister (Secrétaire d'État) in the government of Raymond Barre, President of the regional council of Upper Normandy, and also a deputy.

Rufenacht's political career began in the then Gaullist party, the Union of Democrats for the Republic (UDR), and he remained in its successor parties, the Rally for the Republic (RPR), the UMP, and most recently, from 2015, the Republicans. In the presidential election of 1981, he backed the former Gaullist prime minister Michel Debré for the presidency against his own party leader, Jacques Chirac, but supported him in 1988 and 1995 and served successfully as his campaign manager for the presidential election of 2002.

With Jacques Barrot, he was seen as one of several possible successors of Dominique de Villepin as Prime Minister of France.

In October 2010, he resigned from his post as mayor of Le Havre to be replaced by Édouard Philippe.

Rufenacht died on 5 September 2020, aged 81.

== Honours and awards ==
- Chevalier of the Order of the Legion of Honour (1996)
- Officier of the Order of the Legion of Honour (2004)
- Commander of the Order of the Legion of Honour (2009)
- Chevalier of the Ordre National du Mérite (2005)
