= Édouard Philippe =

Prime Minister of France from 2017 to 2020

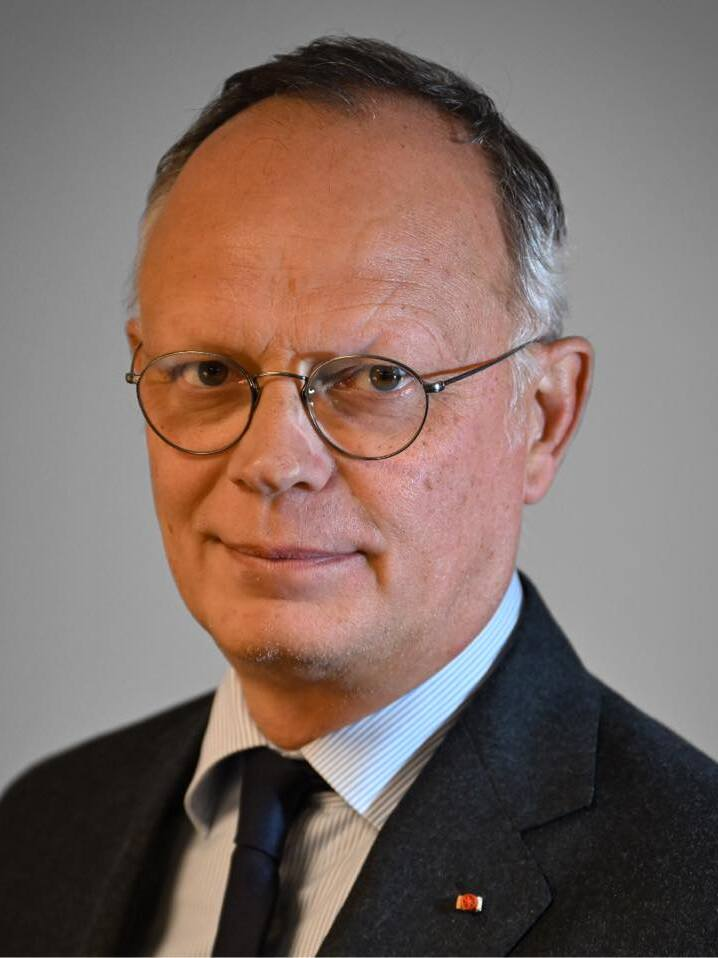
- Philippe in 2024

Prime Minister of France
- In office 15 May 2017 – 3 July 2020
- President: Emmanuel Macron
- Preceded by: Bernard Cazeneuve
- Succeeded by: Jean Castex

President of Le Havre Seine Métropole
- Incumbent
- Assumed office 5 July 2020
- Preceded by: Jean-Baptiste Gastinne

Mayor of Le Havre
- Incumbent
- Assumed office 5 July 2020
- Preceded by: Jean-Baptiste Gastinne
- In office 23 October 2010 – 20 May 2017
- Preceded by: Antoine Rufenacht
- Succeeded by: Luc Lemonnier

Member of the National Assembly for Seine-Maritime's 7th constituency
- In office 23 March 2012 – 15 June 2017
- Preceded by: Jean-Yves Besselat
- Succeeded by: Jean-Louis Rousselin

President of the Agglomeration community of Le Havre
- In office 18 December 2010 – 25 June 2017
- Preceded by: Antoine Rufenacht
- Succeeded by: Luc Lemonnier

Personal details
- Born: Édouard Charles Philippe; 28 November 1970 (age 55) Rouen, France
- Party: Horizons (since 2021)
- Other political affiliations: PS (1990–1992); UMP (2002–2015); LR (2015–2017); Independent (2017–2021)
- Spouse: Édith Chabre (since 2002)
- Children: 3
- Education: Lycée Janson-de-Sailly
- Alma mater: Sciences Po; École nationale d'administration
- Profession: Lawyer

Édouard Charles Philippe (French: [edwaʁ ʃaʁl(ə) filip]; born 28 November 1970) is a French politician serving as mayor of Le Havre since 2020, previously holding the office from 2010 to 2017. He was prime minister of France from 2017 to 2020 under President Emmanuel Macron.

A lawyer by occupation, Philippe is a former member of the Union for a Popular Movement (UMP), which later became The Republicans (LR). He served as a member of the National Assembly from 2012 to 2017, representing Seine-Maritime's 7th constituency. After being elected to the presidency on 7 May 2017, Macron appointed him Prime Minister. Philippe subsequently appointed his government on 17 May. He was succeeded by Jean Castex before his reelection to the mayorship in Le Havre.

As prime minister, Philippe led the centrist LREM–MoDem coalition into the 2017 legislative election which returned his government with a sizeable majority in the National Assembly. In 2021, a year after the end of his premiership, Philippe founded the centre-right Horizons party, which then became part of the governing Ensemble coalition in the context of the 2022 legislative election.

During his time in office, Philippe oversaw the passage of a package of labour law and taxation system reforms as part of Macron's self-proclaimed "pro-business" agenda. He also led the controversial police response to the yellow vests crisis starting in late 2018, and later became a prominent figure in leading its early response to the COVID-19 pandemic in France, implementing a 55-day national lockdown starting on 17 March 2020. He resigned as prime minister on 3 July 2020, shortly after the second round of the 2020 municipal elections.

On 3 September 2024, Philippe announced his candidacy for the 2027 presidential election.

In 2024, the French National Financial Prosecutor’s Office opened an investigation into Édouard Philippe on suspicion of embezzlement of public funds, favouritism in public procurement, illegal conflict of interest, and unlawful exaction of public funds in connection with his tenure as mayor of Le Havre. In 2026, an investigating judge was appointed to oversee the case.

== Early life and education ==
Édouard Philippe, the son of French teachers, was born in Rouen in 1970. He has one sibling, a sister, who is also a teacher. He comes from a family of dockworkers, a profession in which members of his family are still employed. Philippe grew up in a left-wing household, and stated that his great-grandfather was among the first members of the French Communist Party.

He was at first a pupil at the Michelet School in Rouen before moving to Grand-Quevilly where he attended Jean-Texier College and later attending Lycée les Bruyères in Sotteville-lès-Rouen. Philippe obtained his baccalauréat at the École de Gaulle-Adenauer in Bonn, and after a year in hypokhâgne, he studied at Sciences Po, graduating in 1992, and later studied at the École nationale d'administration (ÉNA) from 1995 to 1997 (the "Marc Bloch cohort"). Philippe served as an artillery officer with the 11th Marine Artillery Regiment during his national service in 1994. He continued to serve in the operational reserve for several years afterwards.

In his years at Sciences Po, Philippe supported Michel Rocard and was influenced by him, identifying with the Rocardian and social democratic wings of the Socialist Party. His brief flirtation with the Socialists ended after Rocard was toppled from the leadership of the Socialist Party. After leaving the ÉNA in 1997, he went on to work at the Council of State, specialising in public procurement law.

== Political career ==
In 2001, Philippe joined Antoine Rufenacht as Deputy Mayor of Le Havre charged with legal affairs; Rufenacht served as mayor of Le Havre from 1995 to 2010 and campaign director for Jacques Chirac in the 2002 presidential election. Recognising the ideological proximity between Michel Rocard and Alain Juppé, Philippe supported the latter at the time of the creation of the Union for a Popular Movement (UMP) in 2002, marking the end of his left-wing activism; the same year, he failed to win his constituency in the 2002 legislative election. He served under Juppé as director general of services of the UMP until 2004, when the mayor of Bordeaux was convicted as a result of the fictitious jobs case implicating the Rally for the Republic (RPR). He then took a job in the private sector, working with the American law firm Debevoise & Plimpton, and was elected to the regional council of Upper Normandy the same year.

In the wake of Nicolas Sarkozy's victory in the 2007 presidential election, Philippe briefly returned to political life working for Alain Juppé, when Juppé served briefly as Minister of Ecology, Sustainable Development and Energy, before being appointed Director of Public Affairs at Areva, where he worked from 2007 to 2010. He was also substitute to Jean-Yves Besselat, who served as the member of the National Assembly for Seine-Maritime's 7th constituency from 2007 to 2012. In 2008, he was elected to the general council of Seine-Maritime in the canton of Le Havre-5, and in 2010 was elected mayor of Le Havre after the resignation of Rufenacht, his mentor, and also became President of the Agglomeration community of Le Havre the same year. After Besselat's death in 2012 following a long illness, Philippe took his seat, successfully holding it in the 2012 legislative election. He was reelected as Mayor of Le Havre in the 2014 municipal elections in the first round, with an absolute majority of 52.04% of expressed votes. Following his resignation on 20 May 2017 as Le Havre Mayor, he retained a seat in the municipal council.

=== 2017 presidential election ===
Philippe worked for the campaign of Alain Juppé in the 2016 Republicans presidential primary, serving as a spokesperson alongside Benoist Apparu. Though Philippe and Apparu, as well as Christophe Béchu, later joined the campaign of François Fillon for the 2017 presidential election after his victory in the primary, the three parliamentarians – close to Juppé – quit on 2 March 2017 after the candidate was summoned to appear before judges amidst the Fillon affair. He said he would not seek to retain his seat in the legislative elections in June to avoid breaching the law limiting the accumulation of mandates. Following the victory of Emmanuel Macron in the presidential election, there was speculation that Philippe was a potential choice for Prime Minister of France, representing three essential aspects: political renewal (at the age of only 46), affiliation with the centre-right, and familiarity with the political terrain.

=== Prime minister, etc. (2017–2022) ===
Aggregated opinion polls ("political barometers") monitoring Philippe's approval

On 15 May 2017, Philippe was appointed prime minister by Emmanuel Macron after speculation he was a contender for the office alongside former Ecology Minister Jean-Louis Borloo, MoDem leader François Bayrou and IMF Managing Director Christine Lagarde.

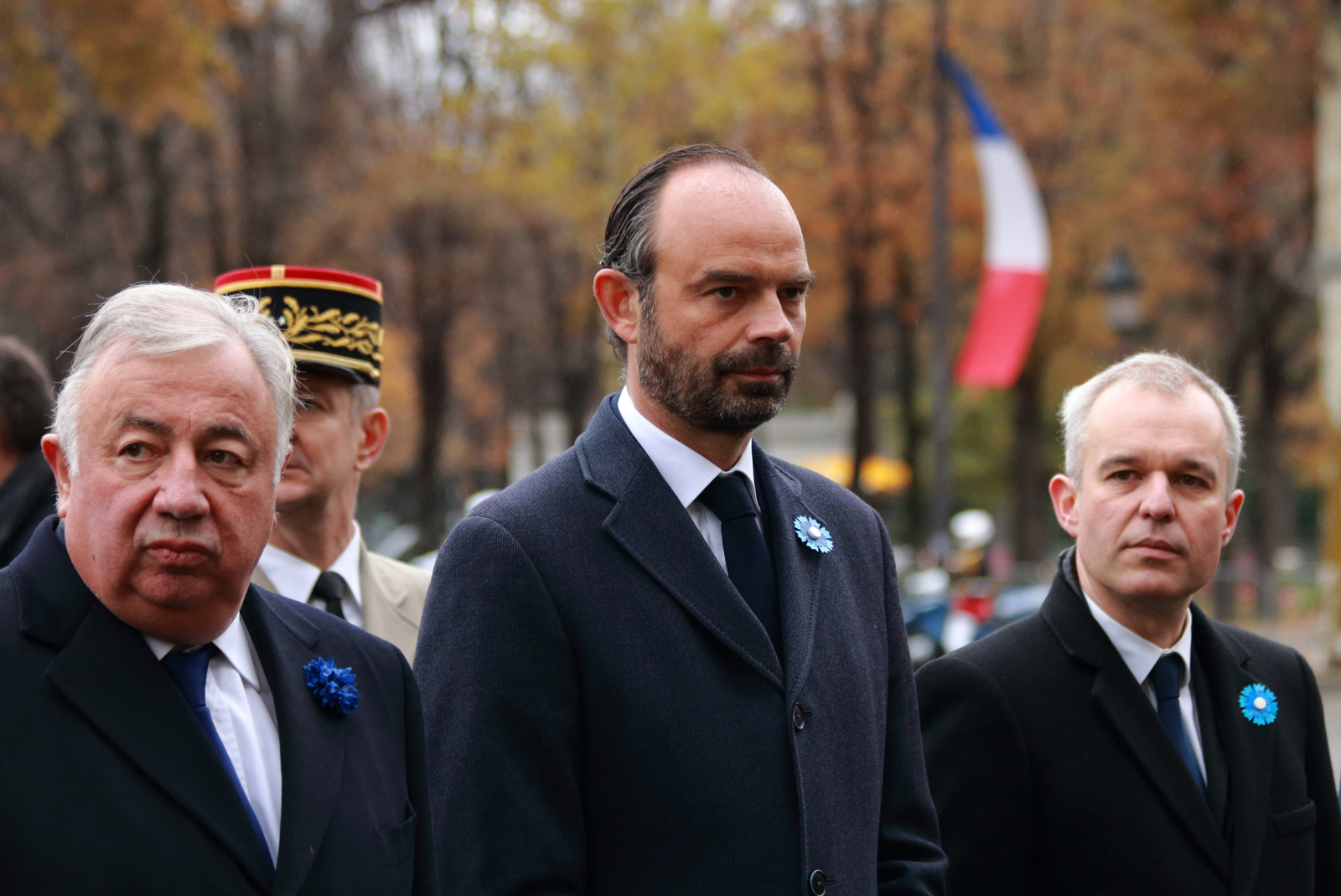
Philippe (centre) with Senate president Gérard Larcher (left) and then-National Assembly president François de Rugy (right) on Armistice Day, 11 November 2017

In the 2017 legislative election, Macron's party, renamed La République En Marche! (LREM), together with its ally the Democratic Movement (MoDem), secured a comfortable majority, winning 350 seats out of 577, with his party alone winning an outright majority of 308 seats. Philippe was still a member of the Republicans at that time, though he campaigned for LREM due to the party supporting his role as prime minister. He formed the Second Philippe government on 21 May 2017 following a series of resignations after scandal embroiled ministers François Bayrou, Sylvie Goulard, Marielle de Sarnez and Richard Ferrand. This diminished MoDem's representation in the government significantly.

Philippe secured a vote of confidence and was allowed to govern with a majority government on 4 July 2017. He was confirmed with a vote of 370 against 67. Following the vote, Philippe addressed the parliament, talking about plans to tackle France's debt by raising cigarette tax and cutting spending. Philippe also talked about plans to reduce corporate tax from 33.3% to 25% by 2022. Philippe announced the government's labour reform plan, which would give companies more power when it comes to negotiating conditions directly with their employees. Labour reform was one of Macron's biggest election promises and has been seen as the government's biggest economic reform.

On 12 July 2017, Philippe announced a new immigration plan. The plan attempts to speed up asylum claims from fourteen months to six, provide housing for 7,500 refugees by the end of 2019, improve living conditions for minors and deport economic migrants. The draft of the law was to be introduced in September. On 3 July 2020, Philippe resigned as prime minister. As part of the 2020 municipal elections, he ran successfully for mayor of Le Havre. Ahead of the 2022 presidential election, Philippe endorsed Macron for re-election.

=== Presidential campaign (2024 – present) ===
On 3 September 2024, Philippe announced his candidacy for the 2027 presidential election. On Sunday 5 July, 2026, Philippe launched his campaign, under the slogan: “Croire en nous” (“Believing in ourselves”). His statement was: “I will ask efforts, but just efforts, shared and spread out through time”, explaining that he wanted to “protect the laborers, the functionaries with modest salary, the self-employed”, and on the other side “took it upon him” to say to the pensioners that they should “contribute longer to the financing of our social model”, “to the senior staff and the employees of the public and private sectors that they should work longer” and “to the State, its agencies, and to the collectivities, that the French expect them to tighten their belts and set the example”.

== Political positions ==
Reacting on the violence accompanying the protests in France on 17 and 18 October 2026, Édouard Philippe has asserted on 27 October 2026 that “the failure of the integration [since] several decades is incontestable”. He pointed at an “over-representation of youth issuing from the immigration” in those violent events. “In the coming five-year-[Presidential]-term, I want to limit the deliverance of residence permits to those persons coming for work or for study, restrict the family reunification, reform the regulations of asylum and harden our negotiations with the countries of origin, notably with Algeria with which country we should renounce the 1968 Treaty.”

== Controversies ==
In October 2020, Philippe was one of several current and former government officials whose home was searched by French authorities following complaints about the government's handling of the COVID-19 pandemic in France. In April 2024, police searched Philippe's office premises as part a preliminary probe opened in December 2023 on charges of influence peddling, favouritism, misappropriation of public funds and psychological harassment.

In 2026, France's National Financial Authority (AMF) opened an investigation into allegations that Philippe, in his role as mayor and head of the Le Havre regional authority, favored LH French Tech – a non-profit organization run by his ally Stéphanie de Bazelaire – to oversee projects linked to the city’s digital hub; allegations of wrongdoing included embezzlement of public funds, favoritism and illegal conflict of interest.

In the 2026 French municipal elections, both Philippe and the National Rally produced campaign literature including photographs of the copyrighted sculpture Catène de Containers, without permission of sculptor Vincent Ganivet. Ganivet initiated legal action and gave all other candidates permission to use the image, to ensure a fair election.

== Personal life ==
Known to those closest to him as “Dédé”,Philippe is married to Édith Chabre, the executive director of the School of Law at Sciences Po. They have three children: Anatole, Léonard, and Sarah.

While he was prime minister, Philippe announced that he had vitiligo, a skin disease responsible for the noticeable asymmetrical white patch of hair on his beard. In 2023, he announced that he had alopecia areata.

He regularly practices boxing.

== Honours ==
Ribbon bar	Honour	Date and comment
	Grand Cross of the National Order of Merit	22 November 2017 – by right as Prime Minister
	Grand Officer of the Order of the Legion of Honour	2020

=== Foreign honours ===
Ribbon bar	Country	Honour	Date
	Australia	Honorary Officer of the Order of Australia	11 November 2018
	Senegal	Grand Cross of the Order of Merit	2019

== Published works ==
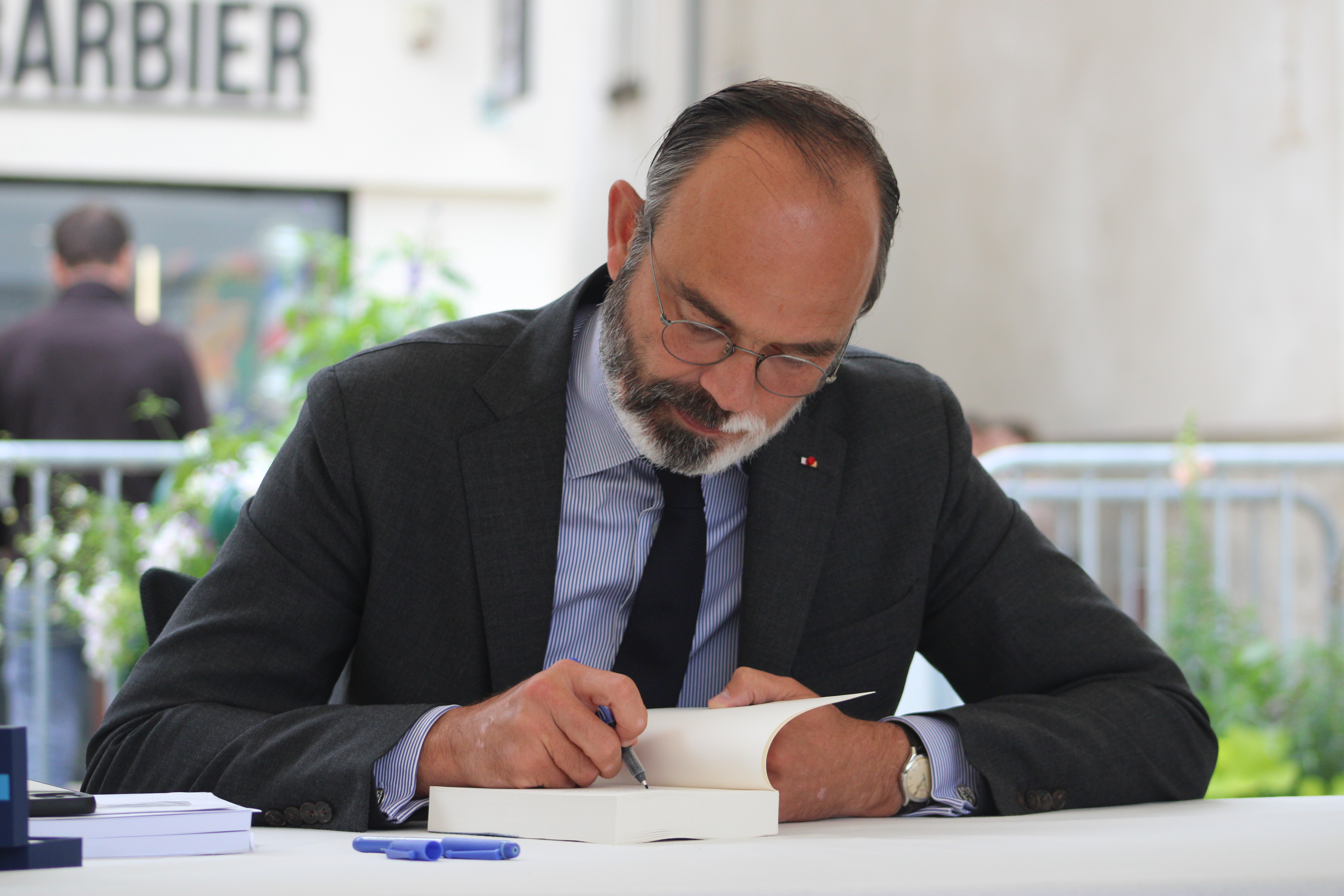
Philippe dedicating Impressions and Clear Lines in Fontainebleau on 29 June 2021.

Philippe has co-authored two works of fiction:

- With Gilles Boyer (2007). L'Heure de vérité. Flammarion. ISBN 9782081237728.
- With Gilles Boyer (2011). Dans l'ombre. Jean-Claude Lattès. ISBN 9782709637558. This political thriller recounts a presidential election mired in tricks and betrayals, culminating with the unmasking of the to-be-appointed Prime Minister's criminal history in extremis.
- Des hommes qui lisent. Jean-Claude Lattès. 2017. ISBN 9782709661430.

In 2015, Philippe prefaced Promenades avec Oscar Niemeyer by Danielle Knapp, published by Petit à Petit.

- With Gilles Boyer (2021). Impressions et lignes claires. Jean-Claude Lattès. ISBN 9782709668484.

National Assembly of France
Preceded by Jean-Yves Besselat	Member of the National Assembly for Seine-Maritime's 7th constituency 2012–2017	Succeeded by Jean-Louis Rousselin
Political offices
Preceded by Antoine Rufenacht	Mayor of Le Havre; 2010–2017	Succeeded by Luc Lemonnier
Preceded by Bernard Cazeneuve	Prime Minister of France; 2017–2020	Succeeded by Jean Castex
Preceded by Gérard Collomb	Minister of the Interior; Acting; 2018	Succeeded by Christophe Castaner
Party political offices
Position established	Leader of Horizons; 2021–present	Incumbent
Order of precedence
Preceded by Bernard Cazeneuve as former Prime Minister	Order of precedence of France; Former Prime Minister	Succeeded by Jean Castex as former Prime Minister
