= The Beach at Sainte-Adresse =

1867 painting by Claude Monet

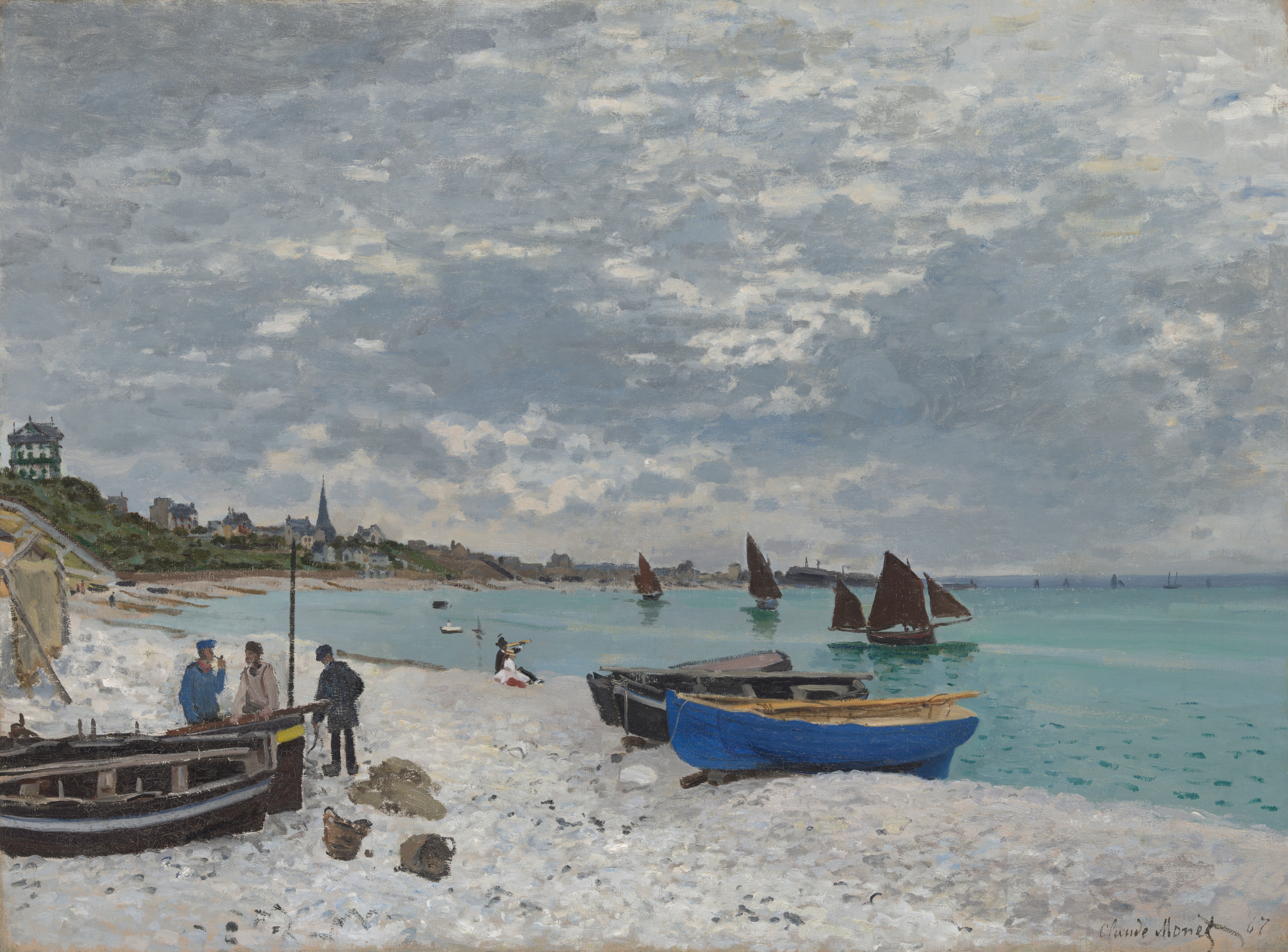
- Artist: Claude Monet
- Year: 1867
- Medium: Oil on canvas
- Movement: Impressionism
- Dimensions: 75.8 cm × 102.5 cm (29.8 in × 40.4 in)
- Location: Art Institute of Chicago

The Beach at Sainte-Adresse is an 1867 oil-on-canvas painting by Claude Monet. Its first exhibition was in 1876 with favorable reactions. It entered the collection of Jean-Baptiste Faure, a French singer and art collector. It is now in the collection of the Art Institute of Chicago given as part of the Mr. and Mrs. Lewis Larned Coburn Memorial Collection by Annie Swan Coburn in 1933.

This painting and the Regatta at Sainte-Adresse were painted from near-identical locations during the same visit to Monet's aunt. The Beach focuses on the fishermen with a bourgeois couple in the background and Regatta emphasizes attending the regatta.

== See also ==
- List of paintings by Claude Monet
