= École nationale d'assurances =

Coordinates: 48.8872°N 2.2383°E

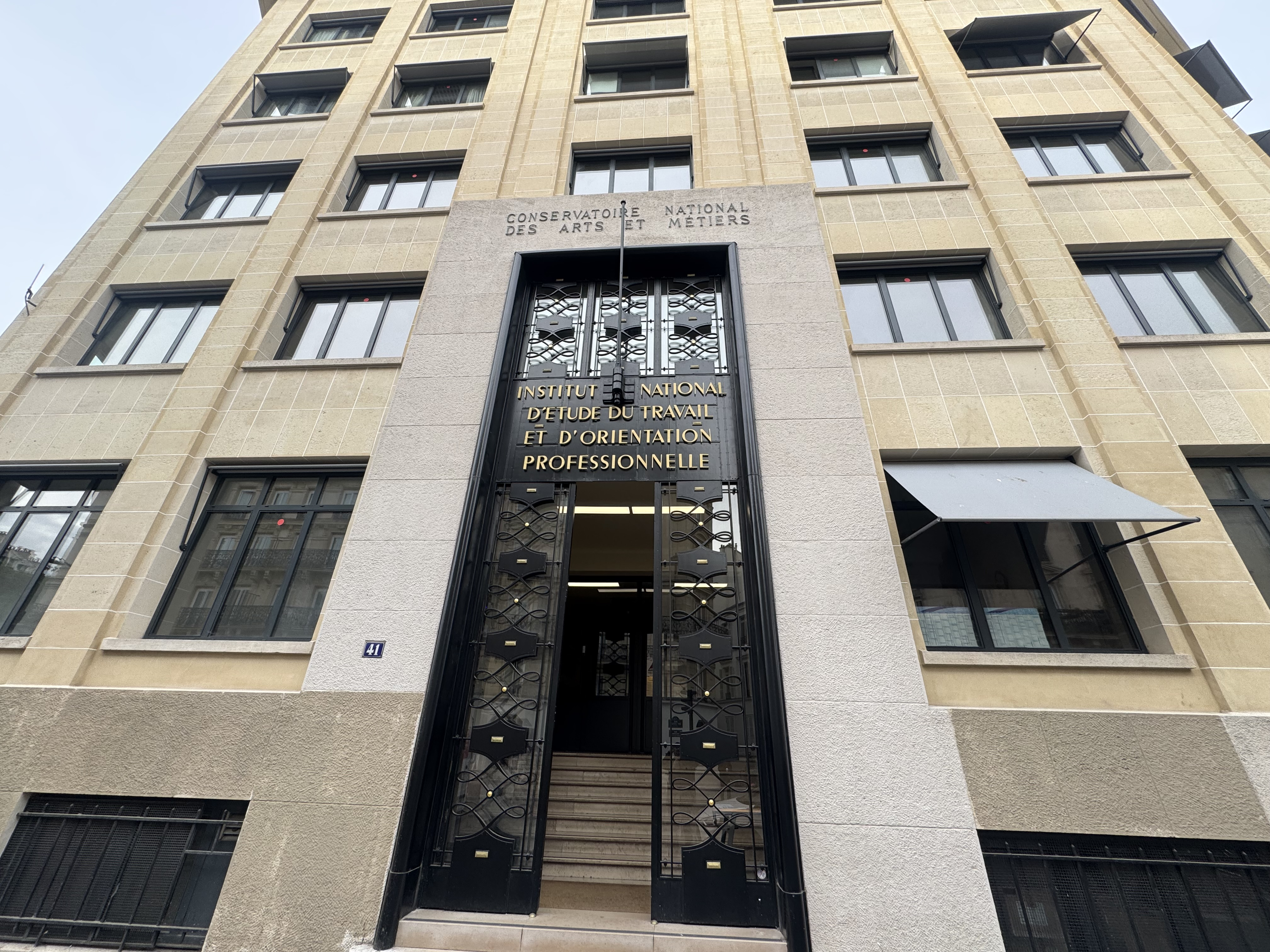
- Type: École supérieure de commerce
- President: Pierre-Charles Pradier
- Students: 1,000
- Location: Paris, France
- Website: www.enass.fr

L'École Nationale d'assurances or "French National School of Insurance" is an institute associated with the French Conservatoire National des Arts et Métiers, which delivers diplomas in the insurance field: Bachelor of Arts, Master of Arts, and Master of Business Administration for executives.

The school has different sections related to the business and insurance industry, Courses cover numerous insurance topics such as life insurance, health insurance, annuities, Social Security, retirement plans, accident death and dismemberment insurance (AD&D), disability insurance, insurance underwriting, and government laws and rules pertaining to these

== See also ==
- Conservatoire National des Arts et Métiers
