= Samuel Dossou-Aworet =

Pan-African businessman involved in gas, oil, and infrastructure

Samuel Dossou-Aworet O. L.H C.L.H G.O. O.M.G
- Born: November 5, 1944 (age 81); Porto-Novo, Benin
- Education: Engineer of the Ecole Centrale de Marseille in Petrochemistry and Industrial Organic Synthesis (IPSOI 1971) Industrial; Engineer of the French Institute of Petroleum ENSPM 1972
- Occupations: Founding Chairman Petrolin Group; Chairman ND Western; Chairman Africa Business Roundtable; Vice Chairman Pan African Private Sector Trade and Investment Committee (PAFTRAC) Founder Fondation Espace Afrique
- Known for: Co-Founder of Energy Africa; Founder of Petrolin Group
- Website: petrolingroup.com

Samuel Dossou-Aworet (born in Porto-Novo - Benin on November 5, 1944) is a Pan-African businessman Officer of the Legion of Honor and Grand Officer of the Equatorial Star. He is a petroleum engineer of the Ecole Centrale de Marseille in Petrochemistry and Industrial Organic Synthesis (IPSOI 1971) and an Engineer of the French Institute of Petroleum (ENSPM 1972)

== Early life ==
=== Consulting ===
From 1973 to 1974, he was consulting engineer for the Economic Corporation of Applied Mathematics (Sema Metra International) in Paris.

=== Governor of OPEC ===
From 1976 to 1980, he also took on a position as Governor of OPEC Special Fund. In 1978, he became Gabon's Director General of Hydrocarbons, a position which he held until 1991. While he was Director General of Hydrocarbons, Samuel Dossou-Aworet also held the position of Gabon's National Representative to the African Petroleum Producers Association (APPA), from 1988 to 1992.

=== Gabonese administration ===
From 1974 to 1977 he became an advisor to Gabon's minister of Mines, Energy and Petroleum. From 1991 to 1992, he held the position of Gabon's General Commissioner for the Inspection and Control of Hydrocarbons and Mines.

== Current Activities ==
=== Oil and Gas in Africa ===
Samuel Dossou-Aworet plays a major role in the oil and gas sector in Africa. He strongly believes in a panafricain vision to develop Africa with both indigenous and international players.

Samuel Dossou-Aworet founded Petrolin, a company he created in London in 1992 and which has been headquartered in Geneva Switzerland since 1993. Petrolin is now in multiple countries in Africa.

In 1994, Samuel Dossou- Aworet approached Engen Petroleum, a predominant South African oil company, to form Energy Africa, the first pan African exploration and production company traded in the Johannesburg stock exchange. Ten year after its creation, the company was acquired by Tullow Oil, doubling the British oil company size in the process. Since, Tullow had successful endeavors in Africa namely in Ghana with the Jubilee Oil Field

In 2012, a joint venture including Dossou's company Petrolin Trading Ltd. acquired 45% participating interest held by Shell, Total and Eni in Block OML 34 in Nigeria via an international invitation to tender. ND Western Limited, the new independent Nigerian oil and gas exploration and production company won and Samuel Dossou-Aworet became its chairman and main shareholder.

=== Infrastructure ===
Through his infrastructure affiliate, Samuel Dossou-Aworet has been promoting the "Epine Dorsale" or Backbone Project, a vast and integrated infrastructure project in west Africa. Since inception, it has been self-funded and involves the construction of dry ports, a deep-sea port, the rehabilitation and extension of a railway and an international Airport.

== Business Associations ==
On Septembre 2017, Samuel Dossou-Aworet was unanimous elected President of the African Business Round Table (ABR). He has been pushing for regional integration on the African continent with the desire to rebound close ties with the African Development Bank (AfDB) through private sector projects.

- Samuel Dossou-Aworet is
  - Member of the Board of Director of Corporate Council on Africa (CCA)
  - President and co-founder of the African Institute of Petroleum
  - President of ABR International Chapter
  - Founding member of the Geneva Petroleum Club
  - Vice-president of PAFTRAC

== Humanitarian Activities ==
Samuel Dossou-Aworet has contributed to the wellbeing of the African population, long before the creation of his Pan-African NGO, Fondation Espace Afrique (FEA), recognized as public utility by Geneva in 1996 and by Benin 2004. FEA has worked with international NGO such as Mercy Ships, Médecins du Monde Suisse to name a few. Humanitarian actions of Samuel Dossou-Aworet includes

- the creation of a free and well-equipped boarding-school complex in a rural area of Gabon and
- the construction of the International Center for the Experimentation and Valorization of African Resources (CIEVRA) located in Benin

== Awards & Recognitions ==
Distinctions received by Mr. Samuel Dossou-Aworet include:

=== French honors ===
- Legion of Honour
  - Officer of the Legion of Honor (France)
  - Chevalier of the Legion of Honor (France)

=== Gabonese honors ===
• Grand Officer in the order of Merit of Gabon.

• Commander of the Equatorial Star of Gabon.

• Medal of Honor of the Gabonese National Gendarmerie.

=== Oil and gas honors ===
• Distinguished Contribution to the African Oil Industry Awards (South Africa)

=== Other honors ===
Lifetime Achievement Award in the Africa Economy Builders Awards Forum (Ivory Coast)

First laureate of the African Builders Award (Canada)

== Links ==
- http://www.jeuneafrique.com/mag/300160/economie/decryptage-samuel-dossou-proches-reseau-affaires/
