= Seine-Maritime's 6th constituency =

Constituency of the National Assembly of France

6th constituency of Seine-Maritime
- inline Constituency of the National Assembly of France

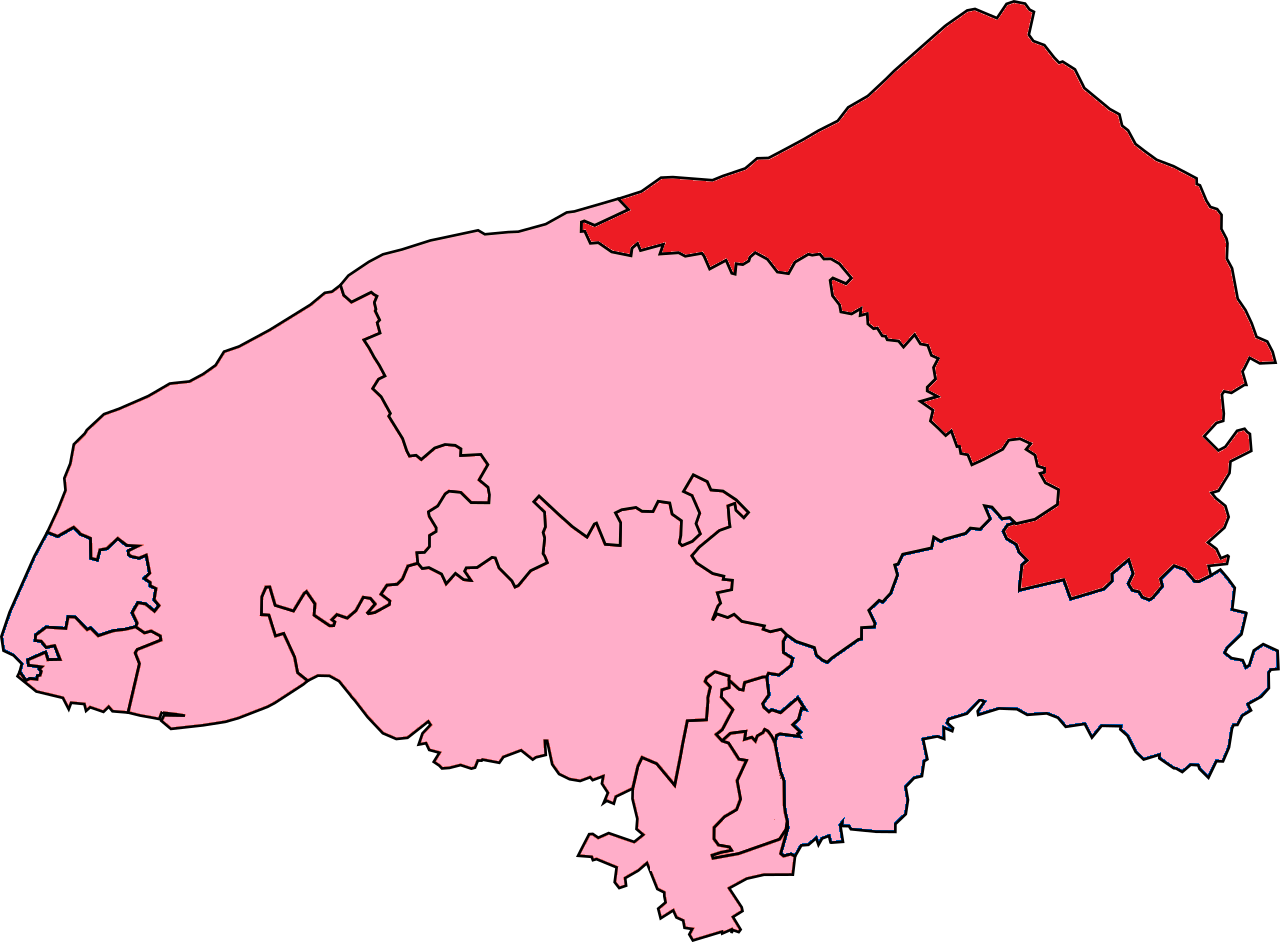
- Seine-Maritime's 6th Constituency shown within Seine-Maritime
- Deputy: Patrice Martin; RN
- Department: Seine-Maritime
- Cantons: Aumale, Blangy-sur-Bresle, Dieppe Est, Dieppe Ouest, Forges-les-Eaux, Envermeu, Eu, Londinières, Neufchâtel-en-Bray, Offranville
- Registered voters: 109566

The 6th constituency of the Seine-Maritime (French: Sixième circonscription de la Seine-Maritime) is a French legislative constituency in the Seine-Maritime département. Like the other 576 French constituencies, it elects one MP using the two-round system, with a run-off if no candidate receives over 50% of the vote in the first round.

== Description ==
The 6th Constituency of the Seine-Maritime covers a large northern area of the department including the coastal port of Dieppe. The seat in its current form was only created for the 2012 elections largely from the area previously contained within the defunct Seine-Maritime's 11th constituency.

== Assembly members ==
Election	Member	Party
1958	Pierre Courant	CNIP
1962	Maurice Georges	UNR
1967	Maurice Georges	UDR
1968	Maurice Georges	UDR
1973	Maurice Georges	UDR
1975	Antoine Rufenacht	UDR
1976	Raymond Réjaud	UDR
1978	Antoine Rufenacht	RPR
1981	Joseph Menga	PS
1986	Proportional representation – no election by constituency	
1988	Paul Dhaille	PS
1993	Denis Merville	RPR
1997	Paul Dhaille	PS
2002	Denis Merville	UMP
2007	Jean-Paul Lecoq	PCF
2012	Sandrine Hurel	PS
2015	Marie Le Vern	PS
2017	Sébastien Jumel	PCF
2022	Sébastien Jumel	PCF
2024	Patrice Martin	RN

== Election results ==
=== 2024 ===
Legislative Election 2024: Seine-Maritime's 6th constituency
Party	Candidate	Votes	%	±%
PCF (NFP)	Sébastien Jumel	24,763	34.50	−3.16
LO	Éric Moisan	861	1.20	N/A
LR	Stéphane Accard	12,916	17.99	N/A
REC	Olivier Cleland	1,009	1.41	−1.47
RN	Patrice Martin	32,235	44.91	+17.16
Turnout		71,784	97.37	+46.09
Registered electors		109,261		
2nd round result
RN	Patrice Martin	36,281	51.21	+9.02
PCF	Sébastien Jumel	34,571	48.79	−9.02
Turnout		70,852	94.44	+45.52
Registered electors		109,275		
PCF gain from RN				

=== 2022 ===
Legislative Election 2022: Seine-Maritime's 6th constituency
Party	Candidate	Votes	%	±%
PCF (NUPÉS)	Sébastien Jumel	20,800	37.66	+5.28
RN	Patrice Martin	15,325	27.75	+4.97
MoDem (Ensemble)	Lisa Broutté	11,010	19.94	−6.93
LC (UDC)	Robin Devogelaere	3,395	6.15	N/A
REC	Claire Coppin	1,590	2.88	N/A
DVE	Florentin Arthus	1,185	2.15	N/A
Others	N/A	1,920		
Turnout		56,315	51.28	−1.52
2nd round result
PCF (NUPÉS)	Sébastien Jumel	27,801	57.81	+5.54
RN	Patrice Martin	20,290	42.19	N/A
Turnout		48,091	48.92	+1.61
PCF hold				

=== 2017 ===
Legislative Election 2017: Seine-Maritime's 6th constituency
Party	Candidate	Votes	%	±%
LREM	Philippe Dufour	15,197	26.87	N/A
PCF	Sébastien Jumel	12,906	22.82	+6.27
FN	Nicolas Bay	12,886	22.78	+8.05
UDI	Blandine Lefebvre	8,558	15.13	N/A
PS	Marie Le Vern	5,407	9.56	−22.91
Others	N/A	1,603		
Turnout		57,856	52.80	−6.40
2nd round result
PCF	Sébastien Jumel	24,845	52.27	N/A
LREM	Philippe Dufour	22,685	47.73	N/A
Turnout		51,835	47.31	−9.72
PCF gain from PS		Swing		

=== 2012 ===
Legislative Election 2012: Seine-Maritime's 6th constituency
Party	Candidate	Votes	%	±%
PS	Sandrine Hurel	21,198	32.47	+16.06
UMP	Michel Lejeune	20,069	30.74	−8.42
FG	Sébastien Jumel	10,803	16.55	−0.19
FN	Sophie Petel	9,614	14.73	+9.78
EELV	Frédéric Weisz	1,330	2.04	−0.53
Others	N/A	2,274		
Turnout		65,288	59.20	+1.05
2nd round result
PS	Sandrine Hurel	34,322	54.56	N/A
UMP	Michel Lejeune	28,581	45.44	−3.45
Turnout		62,903	57.03	−0.85
PS gain from PCF				

=== 2007 ===
Legislative Election 2007: Seine-Maritime's 6th constituency
Party	Candidate	Votes	%	±%
UMP	Denis Merville	17,743	39.16	+5.40
PCF	Jean-Paul Lecoq	7,585	16.74	+1.60
PS	Aquilino Morelle	7,437	16.41	N/A
PRG	Paul Dhaille	3,410	7.53	−14.64
MoDem	Anita Dumaine	2,506	5.53	N/A
FN	Alain Herlin	2,244	4.95	−7.79
LV	Michel Flambard	1,163	2.57	−0.15
CPNT	Brigitte Bertois	955	2.11	−0.89
Others	N/A	2,267		
Turnout		46,129	58.15	−3.93
2nd round result
PCF	Jean-Paul Lecoq	22,813	51.11	N/A
UMP	Denis Merville	21,819	48.89	−1.41
Turnout		45,909	57.88	−0.41
PCF gain from UMP				

=== 2002 ===
Legislative Election 2002: Seine-Maritime's 6th constituency
Party	Candidate	Votes	%	±%
UMP	Denis Merville	15,644	33.76	+8.28
PRG	Paul Dhaille	10,274	22.17	N/A
PCF	Jean-Paul Lecoq	7,015	15.14	−5.48
FN	Daniel Lefort	5,904	12.74	−3.01
DVG	Rachid Chebli	1,479	3.19	N/A
CPNT	Brigitte Bertois	1,391	3.00	N/A
LV	Malka Kreizel-Debleds	1,259	2.72	−0.23
DIV	Francis Duval	1,081	2.33	N/A
Others	N/A	2,297		
Turnout		47,127	62.08	−8.36
2nd round result
UMP	Denis Merville	21,257	50.30	+10.75
PRG	Paul Dhaille	21,000	49.70	N/A
Turnout		44,249	58.29	−13.85
UMP gain from PS				

=== 1997 ===
Legislative Election 1997: Seine-Maritime's 6th constituency
Party	Candidate	Votes	%	±%
PS	Paul Dhaille	13,035	26.16	
RPR	Denis Merville	12,695	25.48	
PCF	Jean-Paul Lecoq	10,273	20.62	
FN	Francis Duval	7,846	15.75	
LV	Michel Flambart	1,471	2.95	
GE	Patrick Parriaux	1,346	2.70	
Others	N/A	3,161		
Turnout		51,784	70.44	
2nd round result
PS	Paul Dhaille	30,336	60.45	
RPR	Denis Merville	19,869	39.55	
Turnout		53,025	72.14	
PS hold				
