= Sébastien Jumel =

French politician

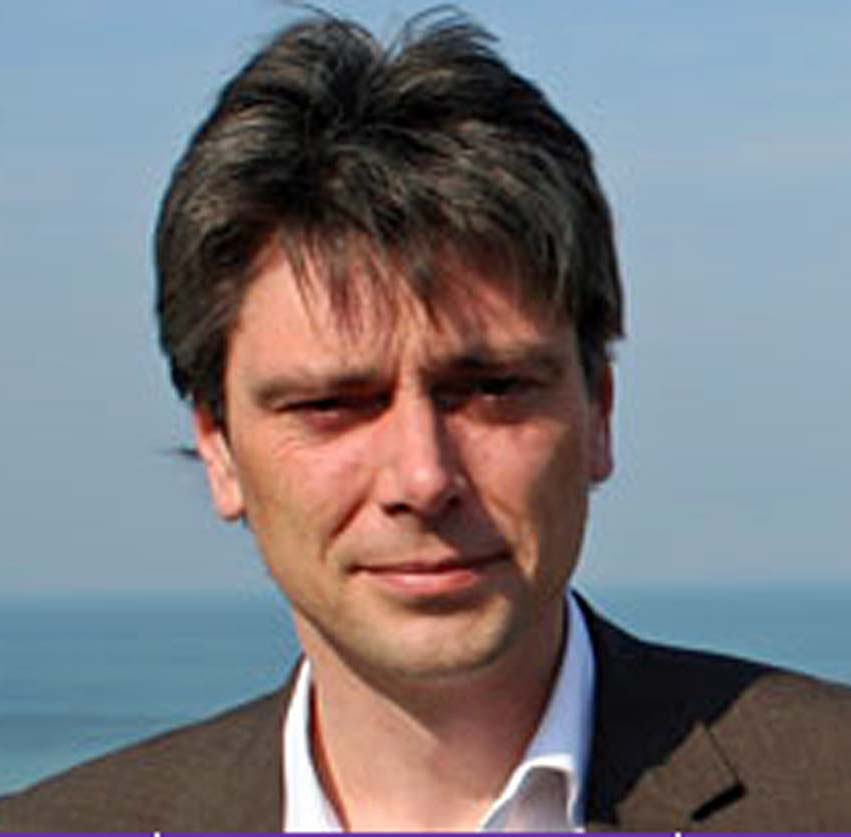
- Sébastien Jumel in 2007

Member of the National Assembly for Seine-Maritime's 6th constituency
- In office 21 June 2017 – 9 July 2024
- Preceded by: Marie Le Vern
- Succeeded by: Patrice Martin
- Parliamentary group: GDR

Mayor of Dieppe
- In office 14 March 2008 – 9 July 2017
- Preceded by: Édouard Leveau
- Succeeded by: Nicolas Langlois

Member of the Regional Council of Seine-Maritime
- In office 13 October 2002 – 29 March 2015
- Preceded by: Édouard Leveau
- Succeeded by: Canton suppressed
- Constituency: Canton of Dieppe-Ouest

Personal details
- Born: 20 December 1971 (age 54) Sainte-Adresse, France
- Party: French Communist Party
- Education: Aix-Marseille University

Sébastien Jumel (French pronunciation: [sebastjɛ̃ ʒymɛl]; born 20 December 1971) is a French politician and a member of the French Communist Party (PCF).

Jumel was elected general councillor for the Canton of Dieppe-Ouest in 2002 following a by-election, and became a vice-president in the left-wing majority in the Seine-Maritime general council in 2004. In 2008, he was elected mayor of Dieppe by the first round with 55.5% of the vote against 40.7% for the opposition. One week later, he was elected general councillor for Dieppe-Ouest.

He is considered a rising star in the French Communist Party, and in 2010, he was selected to be the candidate of the Left Front in Upper Normandy for the 2010 regional elections.
