= Patrice Martin (politician) =

French politician

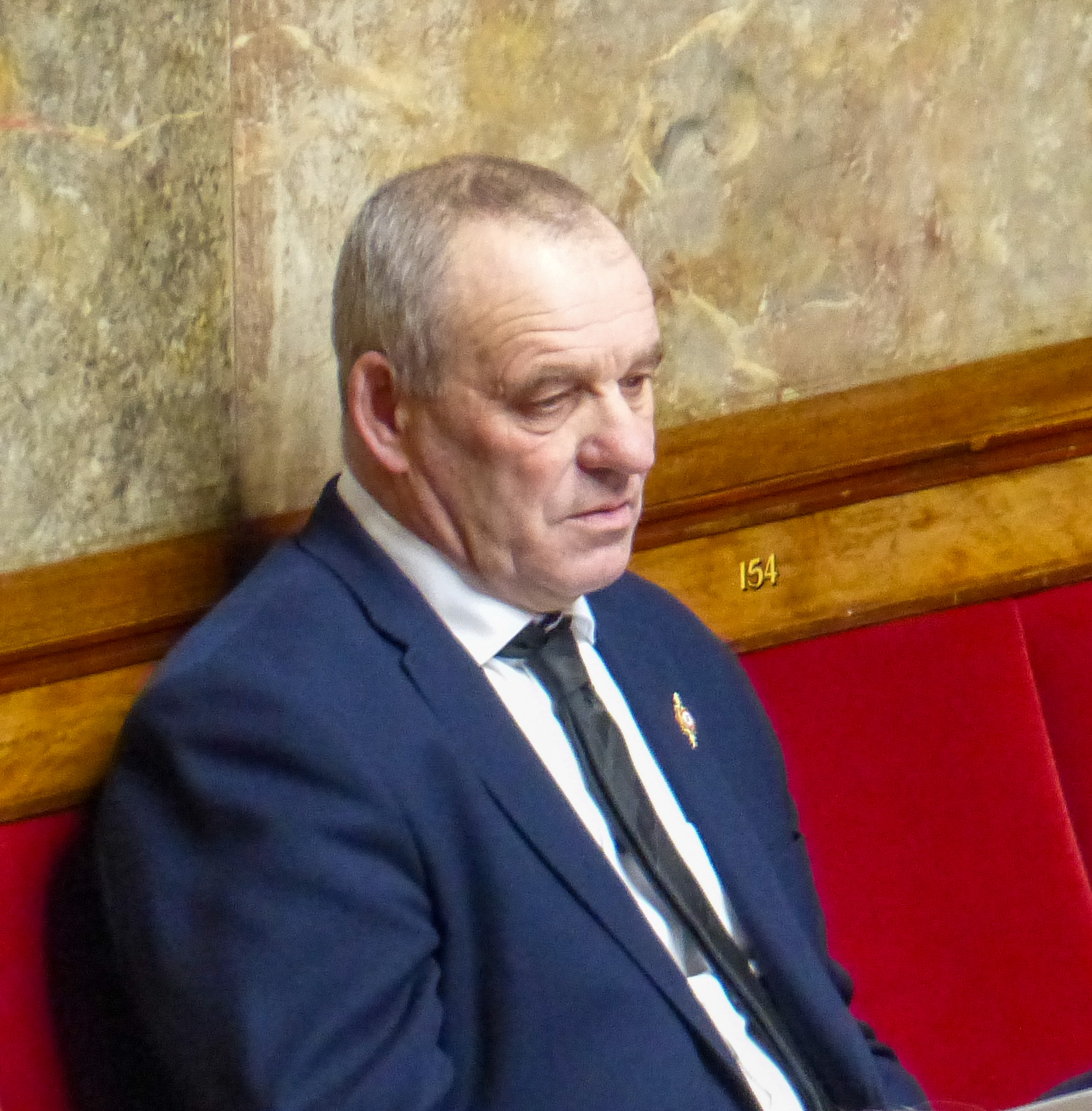

Member of the National Assembly for Seine-Maritime's 6th constituency
- Incumbent
- Assumed office 8 July 2024
- Preceded by: Sébastien Jumel

Personal details
- Born: 13 September 1963 (age 63) Neufchâtel-en-Bray, France
- Party: National Rally

Patrice Martin (born 13 September 1963) is a French politician from the National Rally. He was elected deputy for Seine-Maritime's 6th constituency during the early legislative elections of 2024.

== Biography ==
Patrice Martin was born on 13 September 1963 is a farmer in the region of pays de Bray.

As an activist in the National Rally, he was nominated by the party for the 2022 French legislative election in Seine-Maritime's 6th constituency. He was beaten in the second round by the outgoing PCF deputy Sébastien Jumel.

Following the dissolution of the National Assembly decided by President Emmanuel Macron on 9 June 2024, Patrice Martin was invested by the National Rally in the same constituency.

He is leading a campaign focused on the theme of purchasing power. He takes a stand in favor of farmers, a few months after their national protest movement, and defends "local agriculture and short supply chains", assuring that "we must consume locally, process locally, but also recycle locally". During the campaign, Patrice Martin also addresses the theme of immigration, stating that foreigners are there to "take advantage of the system", and criticizes the opening of mosques, without being able to say whether the city of Dieppe has one. Patrice Martin claims to be supported by business leaders and "many elected officials on the ground, who do not necessarily show their support". During the campaign for the second round, Sébastien Jumel, who calls him a "ghost candidate", claims that Patrice Martin refused to debate him, which the latter denies. The outgoing MP regrets the "tsunami of "brune anger"" which risks turning his constituency upside down.

At the end of the first round, on 30 June, Patrice Martin came first, collecting 44.91% of the votes, and qualified for the second round. On 7 July 2024, he was finally elected deputy with 51.21% of the votes against Sébastien Jumel.

== Controversies ==
Patrice Martin is mentioned by Mediapart on the list of "black sheep" of the National Rally. The media outlet points out in particular his relaying of articles from far-right, Islamophobic or anti-Semitic conspiracy sites, such as Riposte laïque or Égalité et Réconciliation. He wrote in 2020 that migrants will "behead us". During his 2024 candidacy, he deleted some of his publications from his social networks, but they were found by L'Humanité. In particular, in 2019, he republished an anti-Semitic article about Jacques Attali from Alain Soral's site. Also in 2019, he republished a homophobic tweet attacking the singer Bilal Hassani.

It also spreads false information about the pensions of European Union officials, which has been denied by several media outlets and fact-checking services.

Patrice Martin held a climate denial speech, stating in 2019 that the heatwave was not linked to climate change.

== See also ==
- List of deputies of the 17th National Assembly of France
