= Nicolas Mayer-Rossignol =

French politician

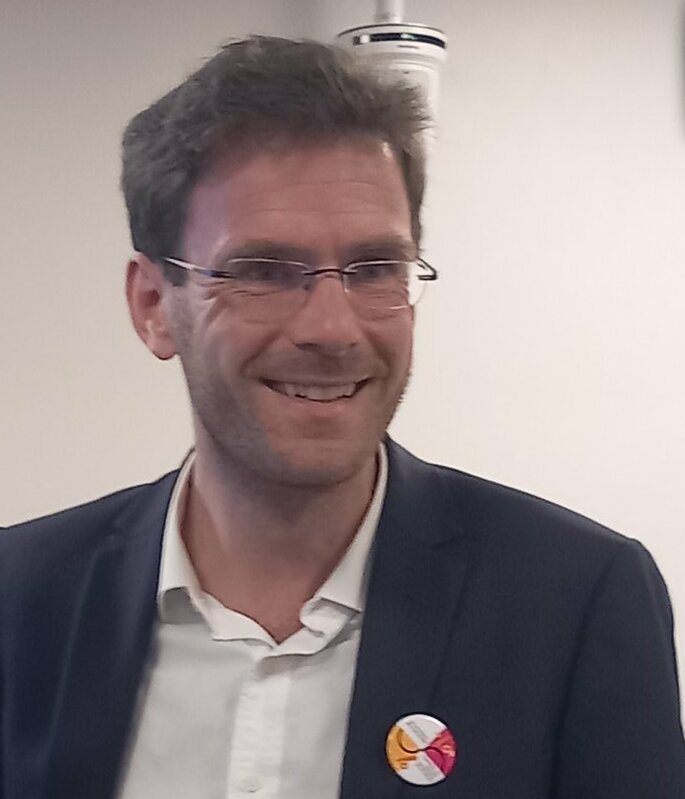

Mayor of Rouen
- Incumbent
- Assumed office 3 July 2020
- Preceded by: Yvon Robert

President of the Regional Council of Upper Normandy
- In office 14 October 2013 – 31 December 2015
- Preceded by: Alain Le Vern
- Succeeded by: Hervé Morin

Personal details
- Born: 8 April 1977 (age 49) Bordeaux, France
- Party: Socialist Party
- Education: École normale supérieure Stanford University

Nicolas Mayer-Rossignol (born 8 April 1977) is a French politician, the current mayor of Rouen.

Political offices
| Preceded by Alain Le Vern | President of the Regional Council of Upper Normandy; 2013–2015 | Succeeded by Hervé Morin as President of the Regional Council of Normandy |
| Preceded by Yvon Robert | Mayor of Rouen; 2020–present | Incumbent |
| Preceded by Yvon Robert | President of the Métropole Rouen Normandie; 2020–present | Incumbent |
Party political offices
| New title | First Secretary Delegate of the Socialist Party; 2024–present | Incumbent |
