= Marie Le Vern =

French politician (born 1983)

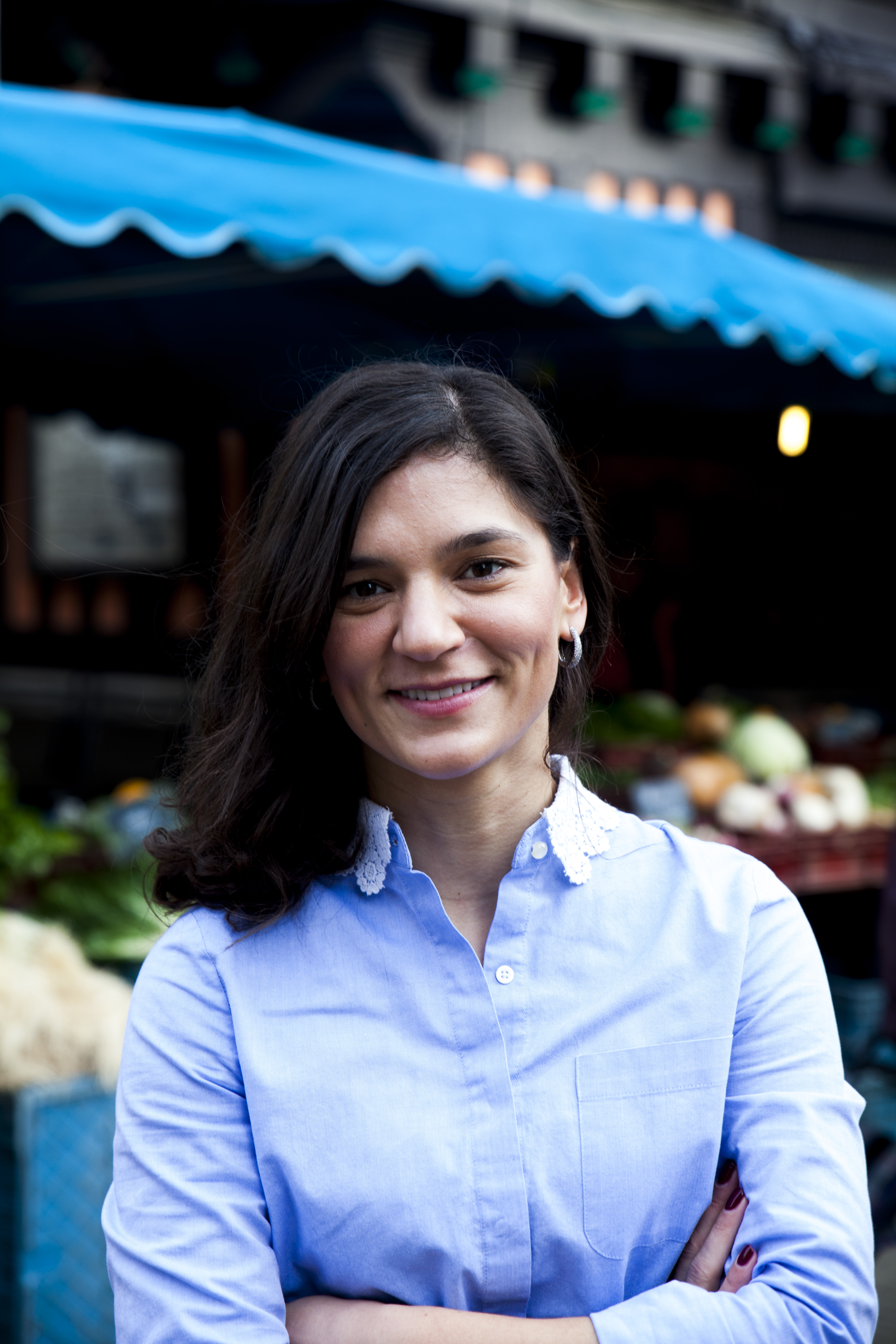
- Le Vern in 2016

Member of the French National Assembly for Seine-Maritime's 6th constituency
- In office 28 August 2015 – 20 June 2017
- Preceded by: Sandrine Hurel
- Succeeded by: Sébastien Jumel

Personal details
- Born: 11 January 1983 (age 43)
- Party: Socialist Party
- Parent: Alain Le Vern (father)
- Relatives: Sandrine Hurel (stepmother)

Marie Le Vern (born 11 January 1983) is a French politician serving as a member of the Regional Council of Normandy since 2021. From 2015 to 2017, she was a member of the National Assembly. She is the daughter of Alain Le Vern and the stepdaughter of Sandrine Hurel.
