= Bonus payment =

Payment for employees on top of base salary

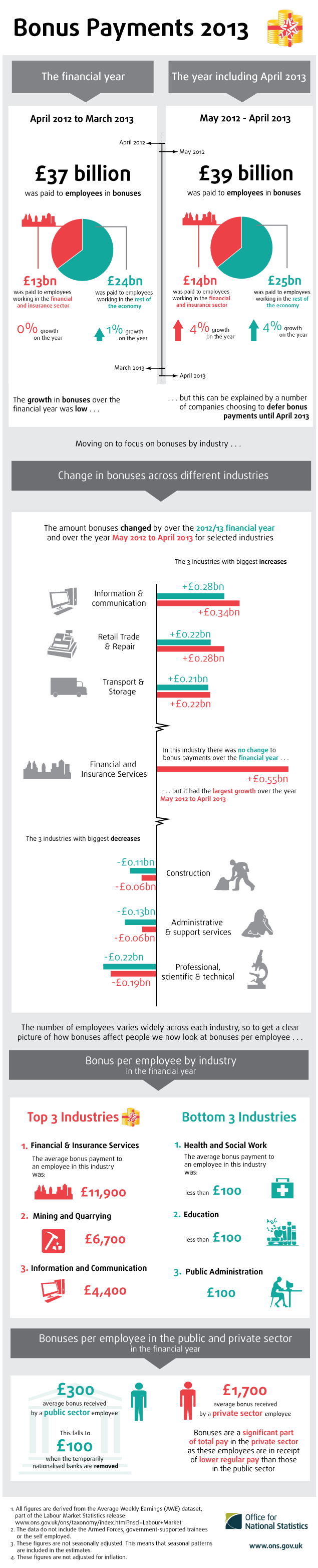
Bonus payments in the UK in 2013.

A bonus payment is usually made to employees in addition to their base salary as part of their wages or salary. While the base salary usually is a fixed amount per month, bonus payments more often than not vary depending on known criteria, such as the annual turnover, or the net number of additional customers acquired, or the current value of the stock of a public company. Thus bonus payments can act as incentives for managers attracting their attention and their personal interest towards what is seen as gainful for their companies' economic success.

There are widely-used elements of pay for performance and working well in many instances, including when a fair share of an employee's participation in the success of a company is desired. There are, however, problematic instances, most notably when bonus payments are high. When they are tied to possibly short-lived such as an increase in monthly turnover, or cash flow generated from an isolated marketing action, such figures often do not reflect solid and reliable growth for a company, or an employee's particular efforts. Australian retail entrepreneur Gerry Harvey, while supporting bonuses for long-term company performance, has stated that:

[...] too many bonuses are focused on the short term. "[To say] 'just because you had a good year this year I'll give you a $5 million, $10 million bonus', I think that's stupid"[.]

Bonuses are prone to being adjusted or even manipulated to the benefit of those employees who are responsible for reporting them, while they are already planning their leave with a golden handshake. Setting up good employment contracts may be a means to avoid this to some extent, but this is rare in reality.

In the 2010s and 2020s, software platforms offering peer-to-peer recognition emerged as an alternative to traditional, manager-issued bonuses. These systems allow employees to award small amounts of points directly to colleagues, which can then be redeemed for gift cards, merchandise, or charitable donations. The Society for Human Resource Management has identified digital platforms such as Bonusly and Nectar as central to this shift, noting their growing popularity as tools for peer-driven recognition and reward.

== Effectiveness ==
In 2016 the management of Woodford Investment Management ended discretionary bonuses. The decision was made because they concluded that the bonuses were "largely ineffective in influencing the right behaviors," and that *there is little correlation between bonus and performance and this is backed by widespread academic evidence".

Also in 2016, the Australian Council of Superannuation Investors "conducted a study of executive pay and concluded bonuses may have become fixed pay, dressed up." They found that despite decreased Australian company earnings in 2015, "93 bosses of the top 100 companies got a bonus, with the median being $1.2 million, the highest since 2007, just before the GFC."

== Malus ==
A malus is the inverse of a bonus payment, when base salaries shrink due to poor performance.

== By country ==
=== India ===
==== The payment of bonus act, 1965 ====
The Indian Parliament in 1965, enacted a new statute called The Payment of Bonus Act 1965. In Jalan Trading v Mill Mazdoor Sabha 1, the Supreme Court stated that the purpose of the Act was to maintain peace and harmony between labour and capital by allowing workers to share in the establishment's prosperity and prescribing the maximum and minimum rates of bonus, as well as the scheme of "set-off" and set-on to not only secure labour's right in the share of profits but also to enshrine in law the principle of "set-off" and "set-on".

==== The New Maneck Chowk Spinning And [...] vs The Textile Labour [...] case on 7 December, 1960 ====
New Maneck Choke Spinning and weaving Company V.Textile Labour Association (1961) I LLJ 521 at 526 Supreme Court held that there are four types:

1. Production bonus
2. Bonus as an implied term of contract between the parties
3. Customary bonus
4. Profit bonus
5. Marginal bonus

=== Netherlands ===
For employees of Dutch financial companies, the bonus may not exceed 20% of the fixed salary (bonus ceiling). Furthermore, a relatively high variable remuneration is undesirable if there is little or no performance within the company. Therefore, there is a ban on these guaranteed bonuses.

== See also ==
- End-of-year bonus
