= Alain Le Vern =

French politician

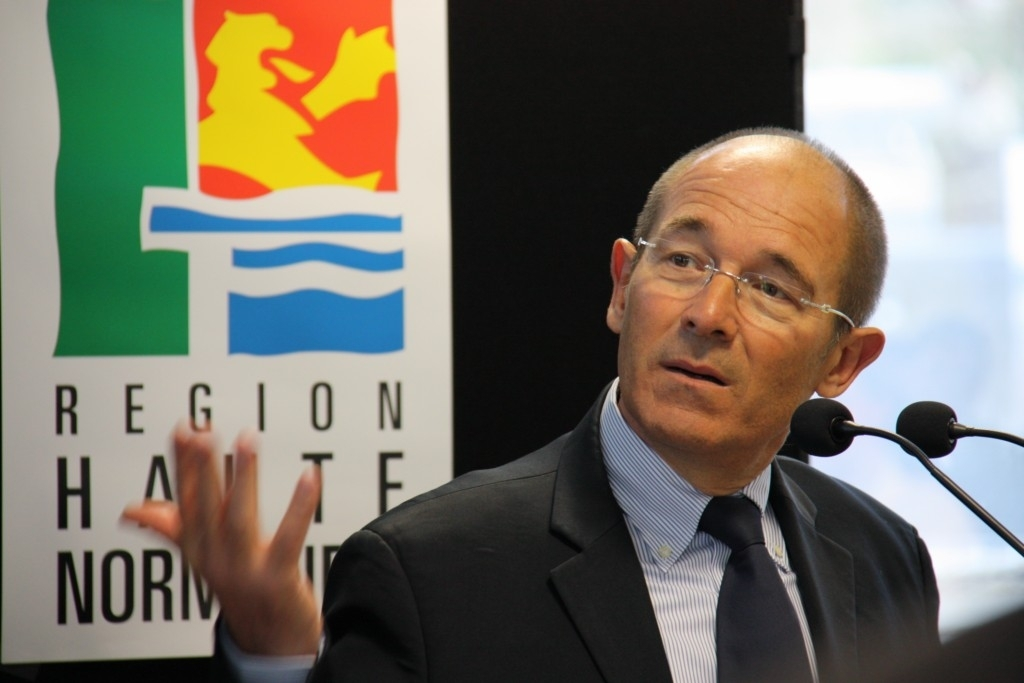
- Le Vern in 2009

President of the Regional council of Upper Normandy
- In office 30 March 1998 – 30 September 2013
- Preceded by: Antoine Rufenacht
- Succeeded by: Nicolas Mayer-Rossignol

Member of the French Senate for Seine-Maritime
- In office 29 June 2007 – 30 September 2013
- Preceded by: Sandrine Hurel
- Succeeded by: Marie-Françoise Gaouyer

Member of the National Assembly for Seine-Maritime 12th constituency
- In office 23 June 1988 – 18 June 2002
- Succeeded by: Michel Lejeune

Personal details
- Born: 8 May 1948 (age 78) Portsall, France
- Party: Socialist Party
- Spouse: Sandrine Hurel (m. 2009)
- Children: Marie Le Vern
- Profession: Teacher

Alain Le Vern (born 8 May 1948) is a French politician. He served as a member of the French Senate and the president of the Upper Normandy region between 1998 and 2013. He is also the inaugural President of the transnational Arc Manche Assembly.

He was elected president of Upper Normandy in 1998 and Senator representing the Seine-Maritime department in 2007. He became the first President of the Arc Manche Assembly, elected in 2005.
