= Plug-in electric vehicles in France =

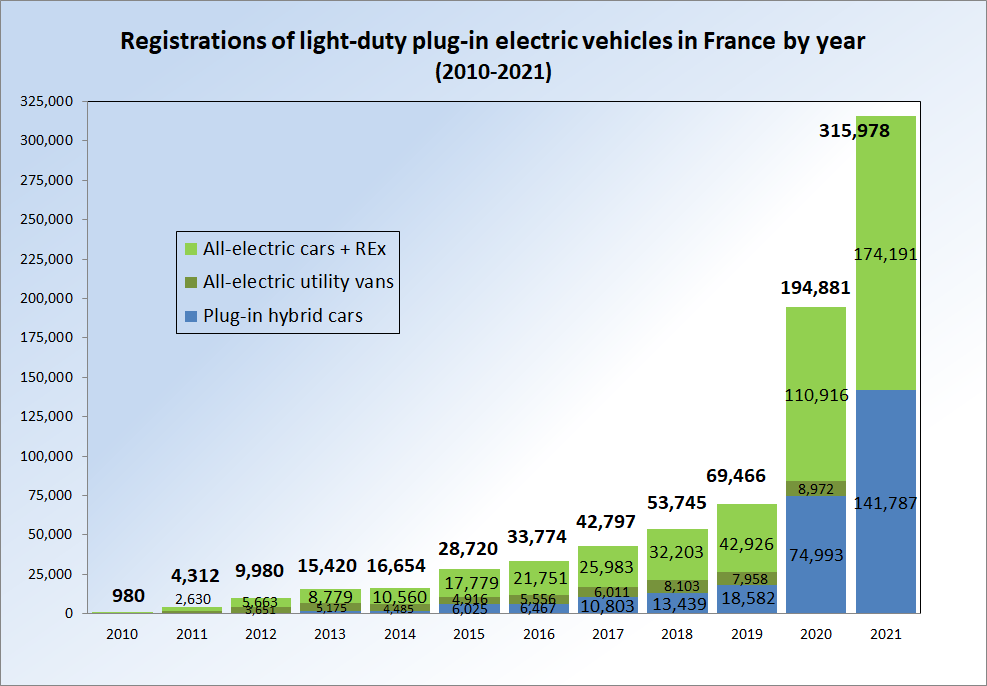
Annual registration of light-duty plug-in electric vehicles in France by type of vehicle between 2010 and 2021

The adoption of plug-in electric vehicles in France is actively supported by the French government through a bonus–malus system through which provides subsidies towards the purchase of all-electric vehicles and plug-in hybrids with low CO_{2} emissions. The government also provides non-monetary incentives; subsidies for the deployment of charging infrastructure; and long term regulations with specific targets. Additionally, France passed a law in December 2019 to phase out sales of cars that burn fossil fuels by 2040.

As of December 2021, a total of 786,274 light-duty plug-in electric vehicles have been registered in France since 2010, consisting of 512,178 all-electric passenger cars and commercial vans, and 274,096 plug-in hybrids. Of these, over 50,000 were fully electric light commercial vehicles. The split among type of powertrain is influenced by the rules of the government subsidies, which favors pure electric vehicles over plug-in hybrids.

The plug-in passenger car segment attained a market share of 0.5% in 2013, rose to 1.2% in 2015, 2.2% in 2018, and climbed to 2.8% in 2019. Despite the global strong decline in car sales brought by the COVID-19 pandemic, plug-in electric car sales in France achieved a record market share of 11.2% in 2020, and then 18.3% in 2021. A record of 315,978 light-duty plug-in vehicles were registered in 2021, up 62% from 2020, and the light-duty plug-in segment's market share rose to 15.1% in 2021.

As of December 2019, France listed as the world's second largest market after China for light-duty electric commercial vehicles, with a stock of 49,340 utility vans in circulation. The market share of all-electric utility vans attained 1.2% of new vans registered in 2014, rose to 1.8% in 2018, but declined to 1.7% in 2019.

The Renault Zoe has led all-electric car sales in France since 2013, and is the country's all-time best selling plug-in electric car with more than 100,000 units registered through June 2020. The electric utility van segment has been led by the Renault Kangoo Z.E. with over 21,000 units sold through February 2019.

== Government policies and incentives ==
Since 2008 France has a bonus–malus system offering a financial incentive, or bonus, for the purchase of cars with low carbon emissions, and a fee, or malus, for the purchase of high-emission vehicles. The bonus applies to private and company vehicles purchased on or after 5 December 2007 and is deducted from the purchase price of the vehicle. The malus penalty applies to all vehicles registered after 1 January 2008, and is added at the time of registration. Since 2009, every family with more than two children receives a deduction from the malus of 20 g of CO_{2} per km per child.

Also a variety of policies have been established to promote the adoption of plug-in electric vehicles, such as non-monetary incentives, subsidies for the deployment of charging infrastructure, and long term regulations with specific targets.

In particular, the EU regulation that set the mandatory targets for average fleet CO_{2} emissions for new cars has been effective in contributing to the successful uptake of plug-in cars in France in recent years. Additionally, the Assemblée Nationale passed a law in December 2019 that aims to phase out sales of cars that burn fossil fuels by 2040.

=== 2012-2014 ===
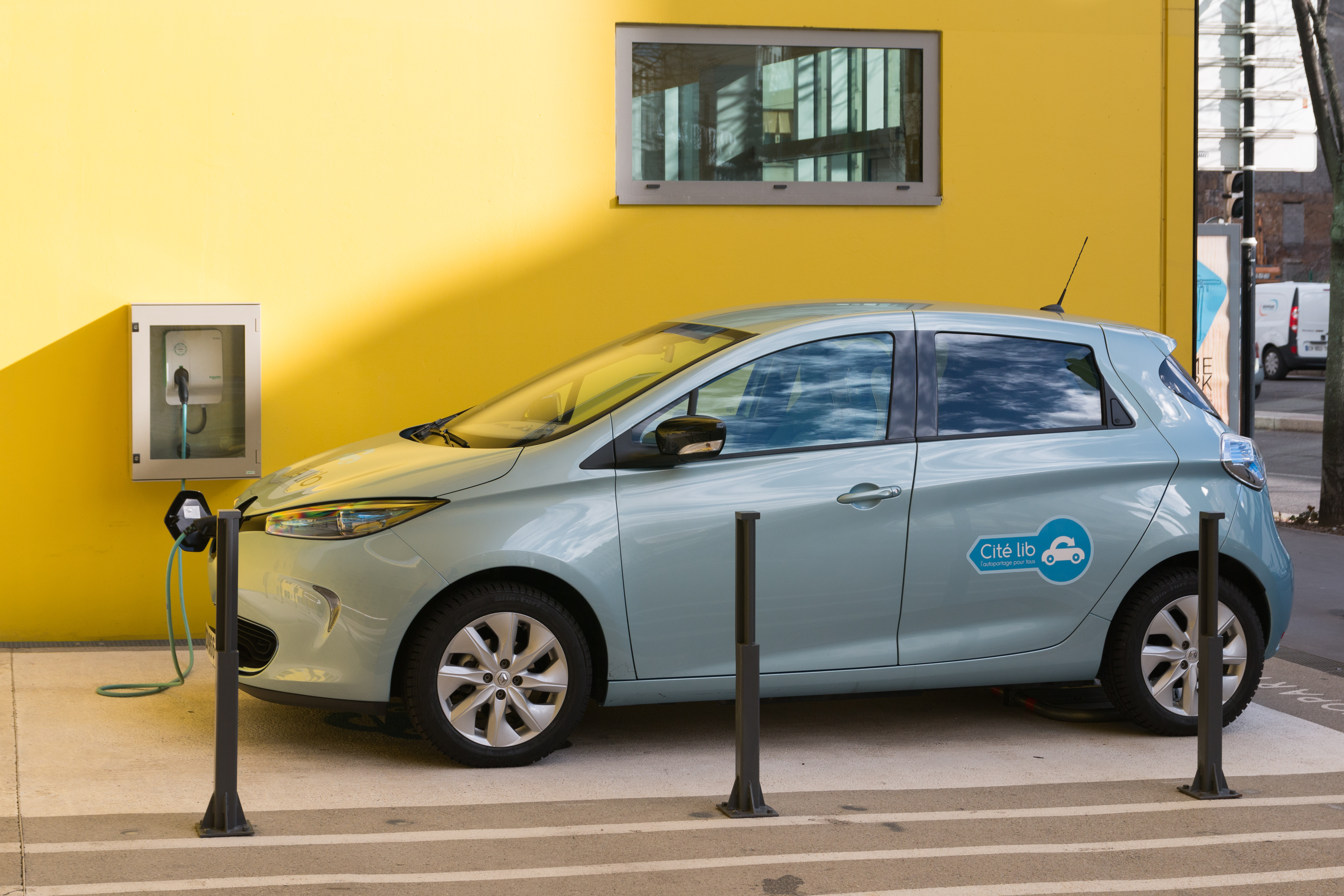
Electric cars purchase under a battery leasing contract, such as the Renault Zoe, are eligible for the full €6,300 bonus for zero CO_{2} emission vehicles.

Until July 31, 2012, a premium up to €5,000, under the bonus-malus system, was granted for the purchase of new cars with CO_{2} emissions of 60 g/km or less which benefited all-electric cars and any plug-in hybrid with such low emissions. Vehicles emitting up to 125 g/km or less, such as conventional hybrids and natural gas vehicles, were granted up to €2,000. The incentive could not exceed 20% of the sales price including VAT, increased with the cost of the battery if it is rented.

Effective on August 1, 2012, the government increased the bonus for electric cars up to €7,000 but capped at 30% of the vehicle price including VAT. The price includes any battery leasing charges, and therefore, electric cars which need a battery leasing contract also are eligible for the bonus. For example, an electric car sold for €23 333 including VAT was eligible for the maximum bonus of €7,000. The emission level for the maximum bonus was raised to 20 g/km or less. Cars with emission levels between 20 and 50 g/km were eligible to a bonus of up to €5,000, and between 50 and 60 g/km were eligible to a bonus of up to €4,500. After this limit, the bonus dropped to €550.

The fee schedule for the bonus-malus was modified in 2013. Effective November 1, 2013, the bonus was reduced from €7,000 to €6,300 for all-electrics and any other vehicle with CO_{2} emissions of less than 21 g/km. Vehicles emitting between 21 and 60 g/km, such as plug-in hybrids and conventional hybrids, were eligible to a bonus up to €4,000, and for emissions between 61 and 90 g/km up to €150, down from €550. Effective January 1, 2014, the fee schedule for the malus was increased to a maximum penalty of €8,000 from €6,300 for vehicles emitting over 200 g/km. A neutral class applied to vehicles emitting between 91 and 130 g/km.

=== 2015-2016 ===
From April 1, 2015, a super-bonus was introduced, increasing the financial incentive to a cumulative total of €10,000, consisting of the regular bonus of €6,300 for purchasing a pure electric car, plus up to €3,700 for customers scrapping a diesel-powered car in circulation before 1 January 2001. In the case of plug-in hybrids with CO_{2} emission levels between 21 and 60 g/km, the purchase bonus is €4,000 plus the scrapping premium of €3,700. Also a specific €500 grant was introduced for families which are below the income tax threshold who buy an ordinary new or second hand car below certain CO_{2} emission thresholds or a hybrid or electric car.

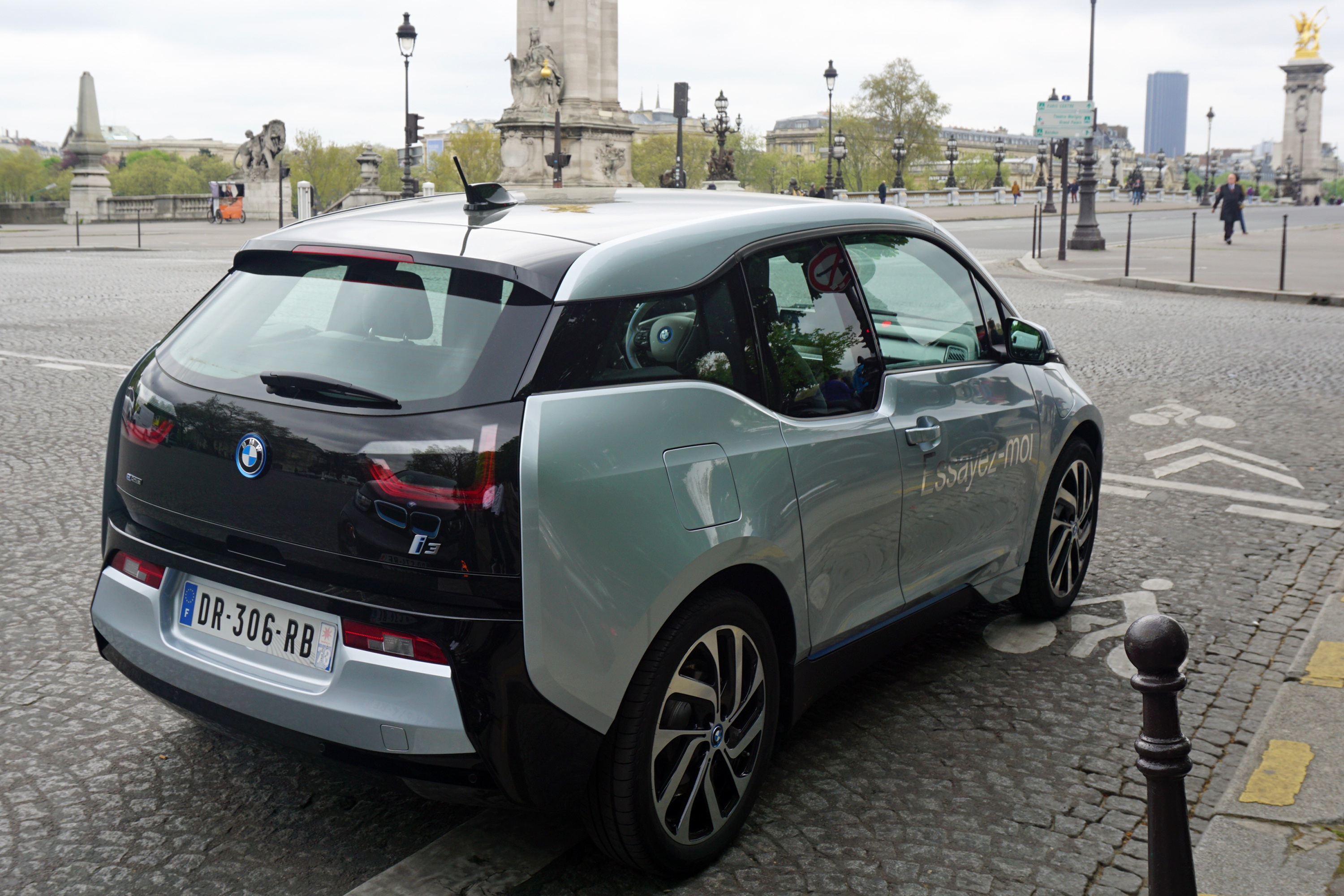
Electric cars equipped with a range extender, such as the BMW i3 REx, are entitled to the €6,300 bonus if emitting between 21 and 60 g/km of CO_{2}.

Effective January 4, 2016, the €6,300 purchase bonus limited to 27% of the purchase price for vehicles emitting up to 20 g/km was kept. This bonus corresponds to pure electric vehicles and those equipped with a range extender. Vehicles emitting between 21 and 60 g/km were entitled to a €1,000 bonus. This bonus corresponds to the majority of plug-in hybrids. Conventional hybrid passenger cars emitting between 61 and 110 g/km with sufficient level of hybridization, with an electric motor with an output power of not be less than 10 kW, are entitle to a €750 bonus. The €10,000 super-bonus for the purchase or lease of a new all-electric car was maintained. To be eligible for the additional scrappage bonus, the old diesel-powered car have to be owned for at least a year and in circulation before 1 January 2006. The new vehicle must not be sold within 6 months of acquisition or have traveled less than 6,000 km (3,700 mi).

The scrappage bonus for the purchase of pure electric cars was maintained at €3,700, while the bonus for plug-in hybrid car emitting between 21 and 60 g/km was set at €2,500. Only individuals or professionals are eligible for the scrappage bonus. Commercial vehicles are not eligible. Neither demonstration vehicles are eligible to the superbonus unless the vehicles are sold or leased within one year following the date of first registration. As of September 2016, the scrappage bonus of €3,700 for trading in old diesel-powered cars has been granted to more than 10,000 purchase transactions.

=== 2017 proposal ===
As of September 2016, the government proposal to be in force from 1 January 2017 provides that the €10,000 super-bonus for scrapping a diesel vehicle over 10 years-old will be renewed. However, the bonus for the purchase of a pure electric car will drop to €6,000 from €6,300 in 2016, but to compensate, the additional scrappage bonus will be increased to €4,000 from €3,700 in 2016. Also, the government plans to introduce a purchase price cap to the vehicles eligible for the bonus, and to introduce a new bonus for two-wheeled motor vehicles. For the more polluting vehicles, the government intends to increase the maximum malus fee to €10,000 from €8,000 in 2016 for vehicles emitting more than 191 g/km, lowering the limit from 200 g/km in 2016.

The government intends to maintain the €1,000 purchase bonus for plug-in hybrids with a CO_{2} emission level between 21 and 60 g/km. However, the proposal does not include anything about the conversion premium for scrapping a 10-year-old diesel car for the purchase of a plug-in hybrid. The purchase bonus for non-rechargeable hybrid vehicles will be eliminated.

=== 2020-2022 ===
The French government has canceled any bonus for cars priced above €60,000. For cars sold for less than €45,000 the bonus will be gradually lowered, going from €6,000 in 2020 to €5,000 in 2021 and €4,000 in 2022. For cars priced between €45,000 and €60,000, the bonus is reduced by 50%, but the French government will certainly adapt if too many foreign cars are bought. The €45,000 limit target foreign cars and specially Tesla, since less expensive French EVs (Zoe, e208, C4 Cactus, DS 3 Crossback e-tense) remain fully supported.

=== Controversies ===
Piggyback on French subsidies

In September 2013, several French news outlets reported that according to the Norwegian newspaper Dagens Næringsliv, some car dealers in Norway have been buying electric cars in France and earning the €7,000 (~ US$9,465) government subsidy. These cars are then imported to Norway and after discounting the freight costs, they are sold at a discount. Dagens Næringsliv cited the case of one dealer near Oslo with 70% of its electric car sales corresponding to vehicles imported from France, and with at least 40 Leafs imported, totaling €280,000 ( ~ US$378,600) in benefits at a cost of the French taxpayers. These dealers took advantage of a loophole in the French law, which only requires to have an address in the country when buying a new car.

== Sales ==
Cumulative light-duty plug-in electric vehicle sales in France compared to the world's top-selling countries and regional markets as of December 2021

As of December 2021, a total of 786,274 light-duty plug-in electric vehicles have been registered in France since 2010, consisting of 512,178 all-electric passenger cars and commercial vans, and 274,096 plug-in hybrids. Of these, over 50,000 were all-electric light commercial vehicles.

Until 2013, most plug-in cars registered in France were pure electric cars, but from 2015, sales of plug-in hybrid cars rose significantly. After the introduction of super-bonus for the scrappage of old diesel-power cars in April 2015, sales of both segments of plug-in cars surged, and for the first time the French plug-in market share passed the 1% mark, ending 2015 with a market share of 1.17% of total new car registrations that year. The stock of light-duty plug-in electric vehicles registered in France passed the 100,000 unit milestone in October 2016. The 500,000 unit milestone was achieved in February 2021.

The market share of all-electric passenger cars increased from 0.30% of new car registered in 2012, to 0.49% in 2013, and reached 0.59% in 2014. The plug-in passenger car segment, including plug-in hybrids, climbed to 1.40% in 2016, and to 1.98% of new car registrations in 2017. The segment attained a market share of 2.2% in 2018, and rose to 2.8% in 2019.

Despite the global strong decline in car sales brought by the COVID-19 pandemic, plug-in electric car sales in France during the first six months of 2020 achieved a record sales volume of 65,267 units, and a market share of 9.1%. The surge in plug-in car sales is the result of French government pandemia stimulus incentives set in May 2020, which rose the electric car purchase bonus up to €12,000 for those owners scrapping their old diesel cars.

As of December 2019, France listed as the world's second largest market after China for light-duty electric commercial vehicles or utility vans, with a stock of 49,340 units in circulation. Nearly half of the electric vans sold in the European Union are sold in France as a result of a national purchase incentive scheme, which French companies have embraced. The market share of all-electric utility vans attained 1.2% of new vans registered in 2014, 1.3% in 2015, rose to 1.8% in 2018, but the market share declined to 1.7% in 2019.

=== 2010-2012 ===
Electric car registrations increased from 184 units in 2010 to 2,630 in 2011. Sales in 2012 increased 115% from 2011 to 5,663 electric cars, making France the world's fourth largest all-electric country market, with an 11% market share of global all-electric car sales in 2012.

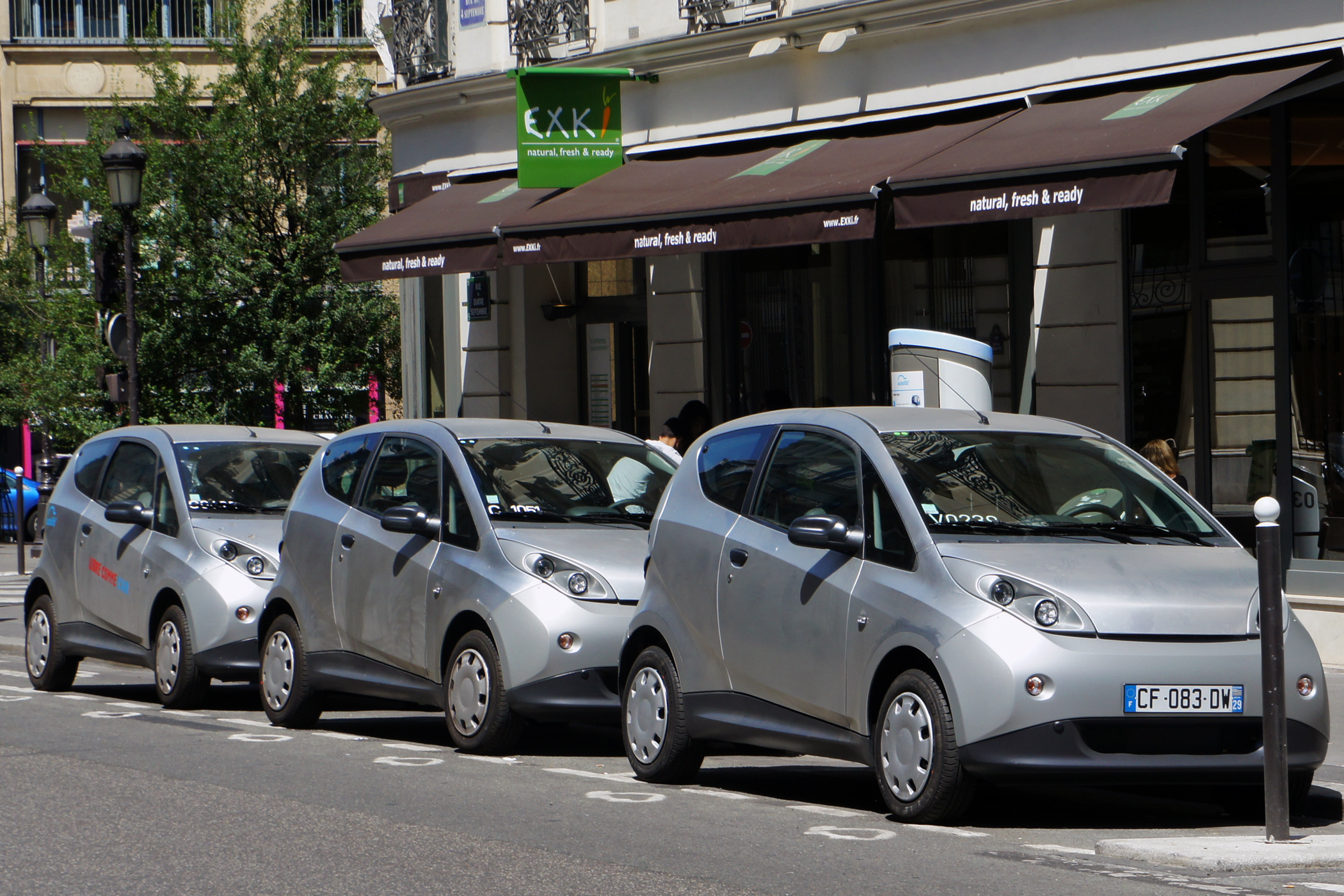
The Bolloré Bluecar, deployed for the Parisian Autolib' carsharing program, led highway legal electric car registrations in France in 2012.

All-electric car sales in the French market for 2011 were led by the Citroën C-Zero with 645 units followed by the Peugeot iOn with 639 vehicles, and the Bolloré Bluecar with 399 units. During 2012, all-electric car registrations in France were led by the Bluecar with 1,543 units, the C-Zero with 1,409, and the iOn with 1,335, together representing 76% of all electric car sales that year. The Renault Kangoo Z.E. was the top selling utility electric vehicle with 2,869 units registered in 2012, capturing 82% of the segment sales. The Renault Twizy electric quadricycle, launched in March 2012, sold 2,232 units during 2012, surpassing the Bolloré Bluecar, the top selling highway-capable electric car, and ranked as the second best selling plug-in electric vehicle after the Kangoo Z.E.

=== 2013 ===
Registrations reached 8,779 electric cars in 2013, up 55.0% from 2012, and the all-electric market share of total new car sales went up to 0.49% from 0.3% in 2012. In addition, 5,175 electric utility vans were registered in 2013, up 42% from 2012, and representing a market share of 1.4% of all new light commercial vehicles sold in 2013. Sales of electric passenger cars and utility vans totaled 13,954 units in 2013, capturing a combined market share of 0.65% of these two segments new car sales. When accounting together sales of pure electric cars and light utility vehicles, France was the leading European all-electric market in 2012 and 2013.

A total of 666 plug-in hybrids were registered during 2012. The segment sales were led by the Toyota Prius PHV, with 413 registrations, followed by the Opel Ampera with 190. During 2013 a total of 800 plug-in hybrids were sold, up 20% from 2012, with the Prius PHEV continuing as the segment leader with 393 units, followed by the Volvo V60 PHEV with 241 units and the Porsche Panamera S E-Hybrid with 90 units. When plug-in hybrids sales in 2013 are accounted for, a total of 14,762 plug-in electric vehicles were registered in France in 2013, making the country to rank second in the plug-in European market after the Netherlands, which sold 28,673 plug-in electric vehicles in 2013.

During 2013, registrations of pure electric cars were led by the Renault Zoe with 5,511 units representing 62.8% of total electric car sales, followed by the Nissan Leaf with 1,438 units. Registrations of all-electric light utility vehicles were led by the Renault Kangoo Z.E. with 4,174 units, representing 80.7% of the segment sales. During 2013 several electric cars from major manufacturers were launched in France. Tesla Model S deliveries to retail customers began in September 2013, the BMW i3 was launched in October, and the Volkswagen e-Up! in November.

=== 2014 ===
A total of 15,045 all-electric cars and vans were registered in 2014, up 7.8% from 2013. With 10,560 cars registered in 2014, up 20.3% from the previous year, sales of all-electric vehicles passed the 10,000 unit milestone for the first time. This figure rises to 10,968 units if the BMW i3 with range extender is accounted for. All-electric utility vans continued to be a significant share of the all-electric segment, with 4,485 units registered in 2014, but down 13.3% from 2013. All-electric cars captured a 0.59% market share of the 1.7 million new car registered in France in 2014, while pure electric utility vans reached a 1.22% market share of their segment. Combined both segments represented a market share of 0.70% of new registrations in the country in 2014.

Light-duty all-electric vehicle sales achieved its best monthly volume on record ever in December 2014, with 2,227 units registered, twice the volume registered the same month in 2013. The slow down in sales that took place in the French EV market during the first half of 2014, allowed Norway, with 18,649 new all-electric vehicles registered, to end 2014 as the top selling European market in the all-electric segment, with France ranking second.

Between 2012 and 2014, cumulative plug-in hybrid registrations reached 2,985 units, rising cumulative French registrations of plug-in electric vehicles since 2005 to 46,590 units, just ahead of the Netherlands (45,020), and making France the European country where there were more plug-in electric vehicles on the road as of December 2014.

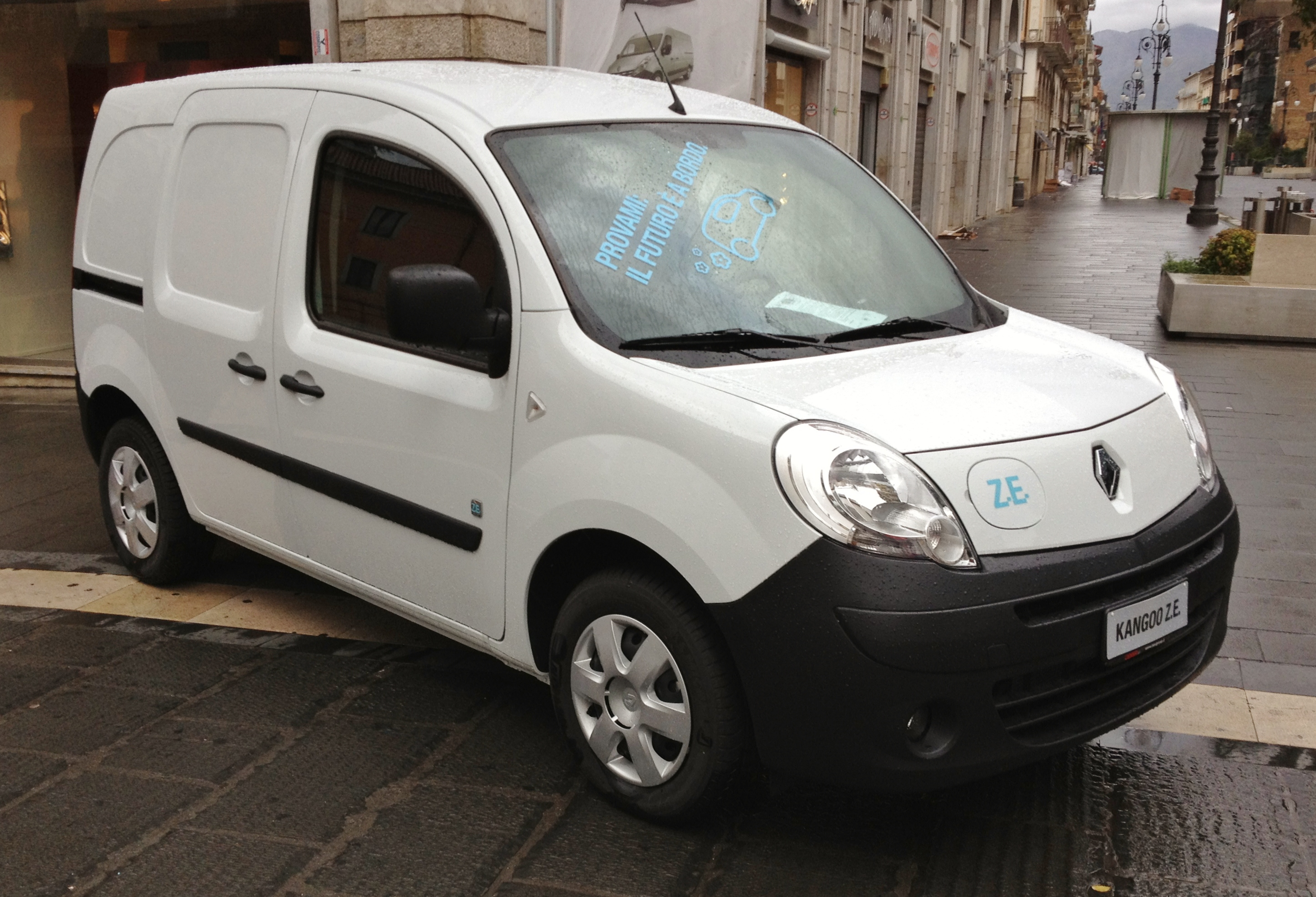
The Renault Kangoo Z.E. is the country's all-time top selling all-electric utility vehicle with over 21,000 units sold through February 2019.

The Zoe continued leading plug-in electric vehicle registrations in 2014, with 5,970 units registered, followed by the Kangoo Z.E. van with 2,657 registrations, and the Nissan Leaf ranked next with 1,600 units. Plug-in hybrid car registrations totaled 1,527 units in 2014, almost doubling registrations from a year earlier. Plug-in hybrid sales were driven by the Mitsubishi Outlander P-HEV, with 820 units registered in 2014, representing 54% of the segment registrations in France that year.

=== 2015 ===
A total of 22,695 light-duty all-electric vehicles were sold in 2015. Sales during this period consisted of 17,779 all-electric cars, up 62.1% from 2014, and 4,916 all-electric utility vehicles, up 9.6% from 2014. All-electric cars captured a 0.9% market share of new car sales in 2015, and electric utility vans a 1.30%. Combining sales of the two segments, the market share of battery electric vehicles rises to 1.2%.

Sales of plug-in hybrids surged in 2015, with 5,006 plug-in hybrids registered in France, up 228% from 2014. The market share of the plug-in hybrid segment reached a market share of 0.26% of the 1.94 million new car registered in 2015. Light-duty plug-in registrations totaled 27,701 units in 2015. Plug-in passenger cars achieved a market share of 1.17% of total new car registrations in 2015.

All-electric car registrations in 2015 continued to be led by the Renault Zoe, with 10,406 units, followed by the Nissan Leaf with 2,220 and the Bolloré Bluecar with 1,166 units. The all-electric utility van segment was led by the Kangoo Z.E. with 2,836 units sold, up 6.7% from 2014. The plug-in hybrid segment was led by the Volkswagen Golf GTE with 1,687 units, followed by the Audi A3 e-tron with 1,123, and the Mitsubishi Ourlander P-HEV with 907.

=== 2016 ===
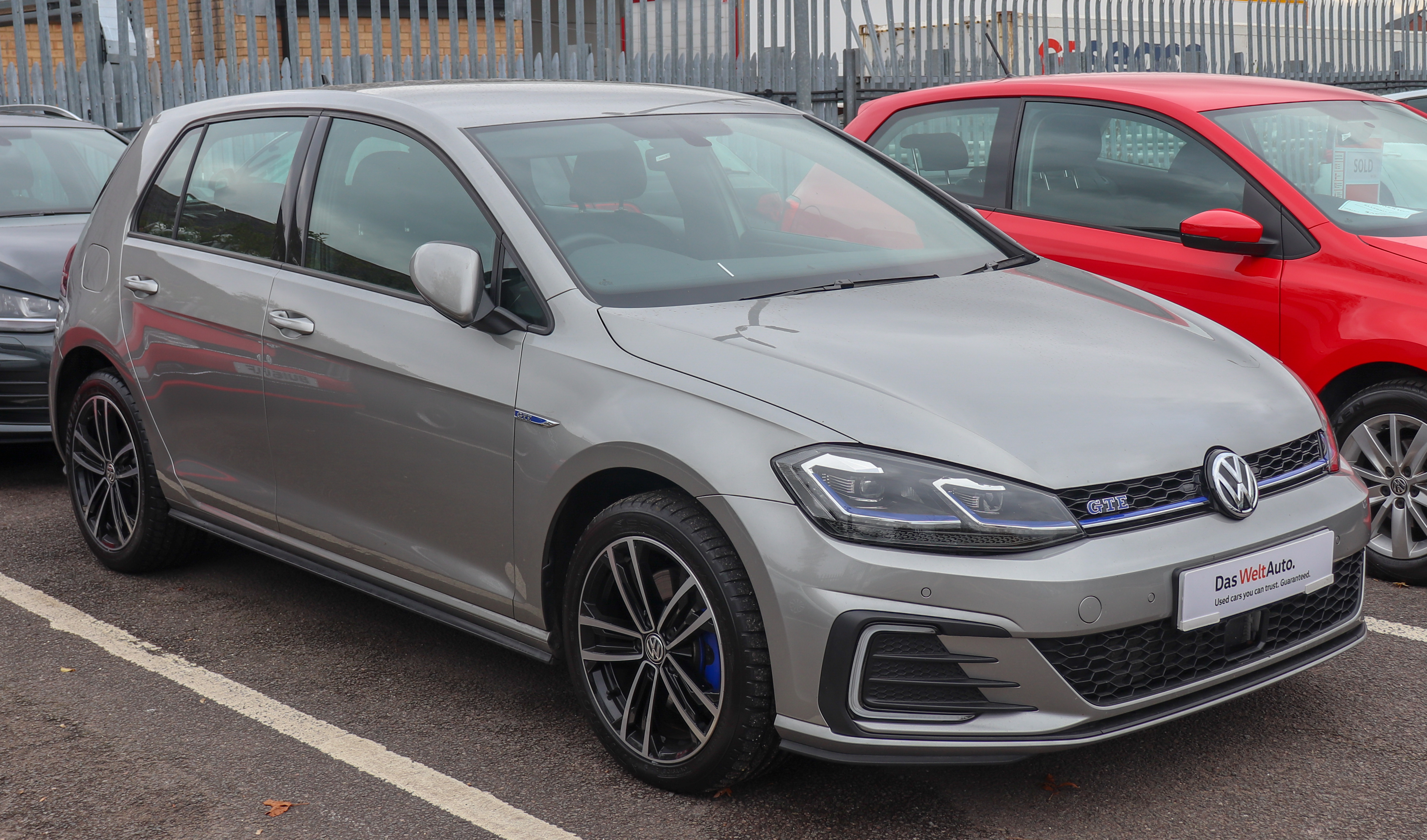
The Volkswagen Golf GTE is the all-time top selling plug-in hybrid in France with about 2,500 units registered through September 2016.

A total of 33,774 light-duty electric vehicles were registered in France in 2016, making the country the third largest in Europe in 2016 after Norway and the UK. France was the top selling European market in the light-duty all-electric segment with 27,307 units registered, up 23% from 2015. Total registrations in 2016 consisted of 21,751 all-electric cars, 5,556 electric utility vans and 6,467 plug-in hybrid cars. The plug-in car segment achieved a market share of 1.40% of new car registrations in the country in 2016. The Renault Zoe, with 11,404 units registered in 2016, ranked as the top selling pure electric car for the fourth year on a row, followed by the Nissan Leaf with 3,887 units, and the BMW i3 with 1,347 (both variants). The top selling plug-in hybrids were the Volkswagen Golf GTE with about 1,060 units, followed by the Volvo XC90 with 742 units, and the Audi A3 e-tron with 659. The Renault Kangoo ZE again ranked as the top selling utility van with 2,389 units registered.

=== 2017 ===
A total of 41,724 light-duty plug-in electric vehicles were registered in France in 2017 consisting of 24,910 all-electric cars, 6,011 electric utility vans and 10,803 plug-in hybrid cars. The plug-in car segment achieved a market share of 1.98% of new car registrations in the country in 2017, with pure electric cars representing 1.47% and plug-in hybrids 0.51% of total registrations. The all-electric Renault Zoe for the fifth year running, continued as the top selling plug-in electric car with 15,245 units registered in 2017. The Renault Kangoo Z.E. ranked one more time as the top selling electric van with 2,546 units registered in 2017. The Mercedes Benz GLC, launched in the second semester of 2016, topped plug-in hybrid registrations with 2,112 units in 2017.

As of December 2017, the Renault Zoe is the all-time best-selling plug-in electric vehicle in the French market with 48,582 units registered since 2012. Ranking second was the Kangoo Z.E. utility van with 15,032 units registered through September 2016. As of September 2016, the Nissan Leaf ranked third with 8,979 units, followed by the Bolloré Bluecar with 5,689 units. Most units of the Bluecar are in operation for the Autolib' car sharing service in Paris, and similar schemes in Lyon and Bordeaux.

=== 2018-2020 ===
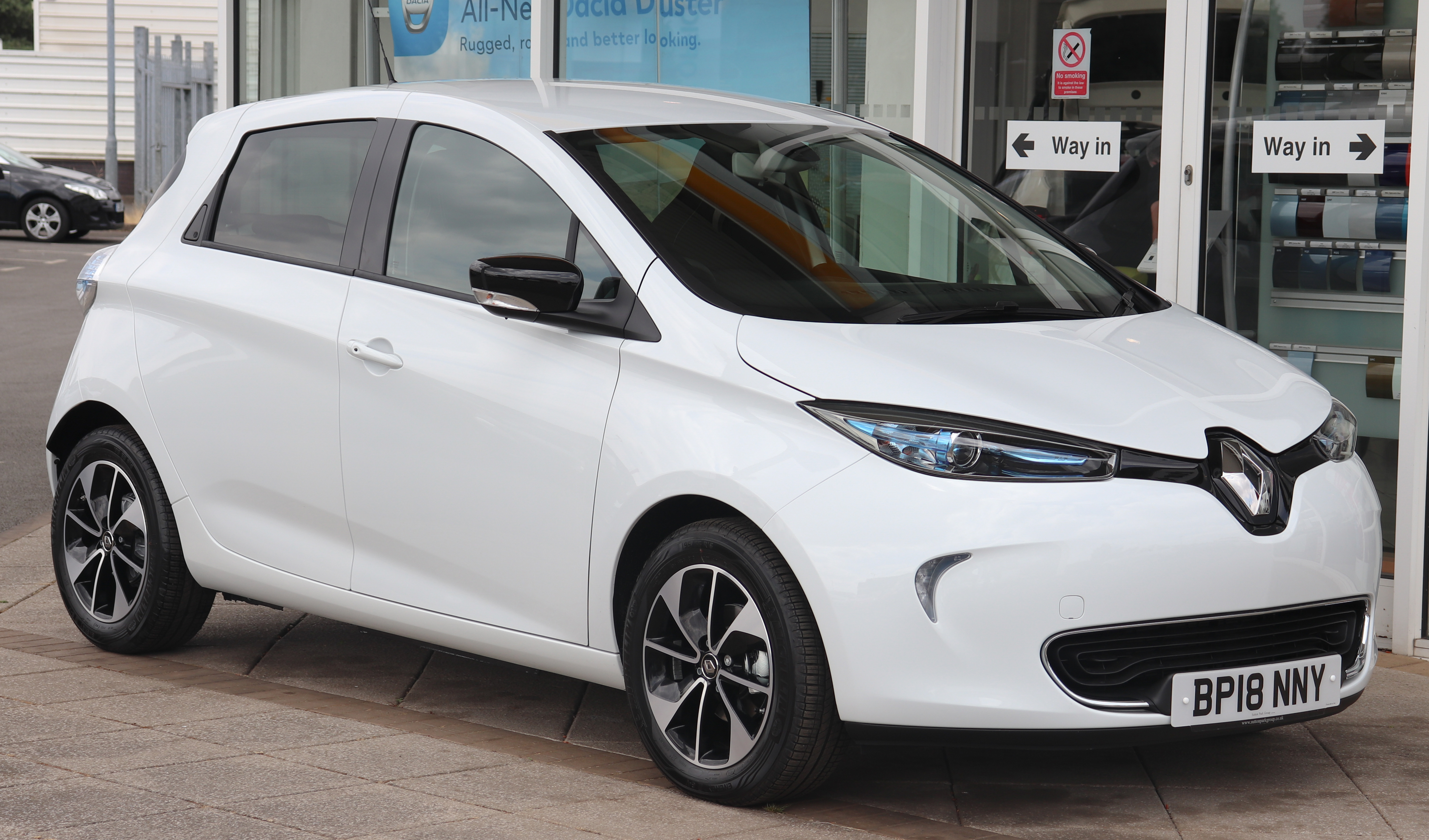
The Renault Zoe has led electric car sales in France since 2013, and is the country's all-time best selling plug-in with more than 100,000 units registered through June 2020.

As of February 2020, there were 305,061 light-duty plug-in electric vehicles on French roads, consisting of 240,032 all-electric passenger cars and utility vans, and 65,029 plug-in hybrids. Despite the global strong decline in car sales brought by the COVID-19 pandemic, plug-in electric car sales in France during the first six months of 2020 achieved a record sales volume of 65,267 units, and a record market share of 9.1%.

Plug-in electric car registrations have been led by the Renault Zoe for seven years running, from 2013 to 2019, with sales through June 2020 totaling 102,087 units since its inception in 2012. The Renault Kangoo Z.E. is the all-time electric utility van with over 21,000 units sold through February 2019.

== Top selling all-electric models by year ==
The following table presents registrations of light-duty highway-capable all-electric vehicles by type (all electric cars and vans, and plug-in hybrids) with detailed all-electric car registrations by model between 2010 and December 2015.

Registration of highway-capable all-electric vehicles by model and total registrations by light-duty vehicle type in France between January 2010 and December 2015
Model	Total 2010-2015	Market share^{(1)}	2015	2014	2013	2012	2011	2010
Renault Zoe	21,935	48.7%	10,406	5,970	5,511	48		
Nissan Leaf	5,865	13.0%	2,220	1,600	1,438	524	83	
Bolloré Bluecar	4,936	11.0%	1,166	1,170	658	1,543	399	
Peugeot iOn	3,144	7.0%	725	163	178	1,409	639	30
Citroën C-Zero	2,638	5.9%	397	154	80	1,335	645	27
Smart electric drive	1,475	3.3%	336	509	478	66	52	34
Tesla Model S	1,071	2.4%	708	328	35			
Mia electric	843	1.9%	0	9	201	384	249	
Renault Fluence Z.E.	727	1.6%	0	5	18	295	396	13
Kia Soul EV	548	1.2%	485	63				
BMW i3^{(2)}	540	1.2%	279	193	68			
Volkswagen e-Up!	495	1.1%	166	265	64			
Volkswagen e-Golf	214	0.5%	125	89				
Mitsubishi i MiEV	165	0.4%	53		38	24	42	8
Th!nk City	121	0.3%					110	11
Mercedes-Benz B-Class Electric Drive	108	0.2%	93	15				
Nissan e-NV200 passenger van	88	0.2%	76	12				
Mini E	50	0.1%						50
Tesla Roadster	31	0.1%			1	10	9	11
Volkswagen Golf blue-e-motion	15	0.03%				15		
Ford Focus Electric	13	0.03%	1	8	4			
BMW ActiveE	10	0.02%				10		
Volvo C30 Electric	6	0.01%					6	
Lumeneo Neoma	3	0.007%			3			
BYD e6	2	0.004%	2					
Total registrations electric cars	45,595	68.8%	17,779	10,560	8,779	5,663	2,630	184
Renault Kangoo Z.E.	13,319	64.3%	2,836	2,657	4,174	2,869	768	15
Nissan e-NV200 cargo van	585	2.8%	343	242				
Total registrations utility vans	20,705	31.2%	4,916	4,485	5,175	3,651	1,682	796
Total registrations all-electric cars and vans	66,300	100%	22,695	15,045	13,954	9,314	4,312	980
Total registrations plug-in hybrids	7,999	10.8%	5,006	1,527	800	666		
Total registrations plug-in electric cars and vans	74,299	100%	27,701	16,572	14,754	9,980	4,312	980
Note: (1) By model, is the market share as percentage of the 45,041 electric cars^{(2)} and 20,705 vans registered between 2010 and 2015, and by type, the share of each type of vehicle (car or van) as percentage of the 66,300 electric vehicles registered between 2010 and 2015. (2) BMW i3 figures exclude units with REx option.

== See also ==
- Government incentives for plug-in electric vehicles
- List of modern production plug-in electric vehicles
- Renewable energy in France
