= Michel Lejeune (politician) =

French politician (1946–2021)

Mayor of Forges-les-Eaux
- In office 25 June 1995 – 29 April 2021
- Preceded by: Pierre Blot
- Succeeded by: Christine Lesueur

Member of the National Assembly for Seine-Maritime's 12th constituency
- In office 19 June 2002 – 19 June 2012
- Preceded by: Alain Le Vern
- Succeeded by: Sandrine Hurel

Personal details
- Born: 21 August 1946 Auvers-le-Hamon, Sarthe, France
- Died: 29 April 2021 (aged 74) Rouen, France
- Party: UMP; The Republicans
- Profession: Veterinarian

Michel Lejeune (21 August 1946 – 29 April 2021) was a French politician, a member of the National Assembly. He represented the Seine-Maritime department, and was a member of the Union for a Popular Movement.
