= Bonus–malus =

Business arrangement of rewards and penalties

The term bonus–malus (Latin for 'good-bad') is used for a number of business arrangements which alternately reward (bonus) or penalize (malus). It is used, for example, in the call center and insurance industries.

== Call centers ==
In call centers, a bonus–malus arrangement is a section in the contract between the company buying the call center services (buyer) and the company providing the call center services (call center) allowing for a payment to be made from one company to the other. As part of the contract, both companies agree on a set of Key Performance Indicators (KPIs). These are measurements for how the call center is performing. If the call center is performing poorly, then there would be a malus payment (payment from the call center company to the buyer). If the call center is doing well, then there is a bonus payment from the buyer to the call center company. Bonus–malus payments are in addition to the normal cost of call center services.

== Insurance ==
In insurance, a bonus–malus system (BMS) is a system that adjusts the premium paid by a customer according to their individual claim history.

Bonus usually is a discount in the premium which is given on the renewal of the policy if no claim is made in the previous year. Malus is an increase in the premium if there is a claim in the previous year. Bonus–malus systems are very common in vehicle insurance. This system is also called a no-claim discount (NCD) or no-claims bonus in Britain and Australia.

The fundamental principle of BMS is that the higher the claim frequency of a policyholder, the higher the insurance costs that on average are charged to the policyholder. This principle is also valid in an insurance arrangement consisting of a high maximum deductible which is common to all policyholders.

=== Automobile insurance ===
Most insurers around the world have introduced some form of merit-rating in automobile third party liability insurance. Such systems penalize at-fault accidents by premium surcharges and reward claim-free years by discounts, commonly known as a "no-claims discount".

The most usual BMS divides drivers by classes, where each class has its own discount or surcharge that is applied to the basic premium. A claim-free year implies in a decline of one or more degrees on the Bonus/Malus class table on the anniversary of the contract. A claim entails an increase of a given number of degrees on the Bonus/Malus scale on the anniversary of the contract. Generally, one degree corresponds to a 5% discount or surcharge. The starting class may depend on the driver's age, sex, place of residence, the car's horsepower. Each country has different legislation, which rules how many degrees an insurer may increase or decrease, the maximum bonus or malus allowed and which statistics insurers can use to evaluate the starting class of a driver.

Academic literature concerning bonus malus systems typically presupposes that the quantity of claims within a given period follows a Poisson distribution. In this context, the parameter λ of the Poisson distribution, signifying claim frequency, is assumed to be accurately known and serves as a risk metric for the policy. Nevertheless, adopting a more pragmatic standpoint, complete awareness of this parameter is often unattainable, necessitating some form of estimation with the inherent uncertainties of the estimation process. Consequently, practical approaches involve fitting it through modal intervals or employing fuzzy numbers, for instance.

=== Bonus hunger ===
There is a basic question under Bonus–malus system based on insurance customer's point of view, that is, “Should an insurance customer carry an incurred loss himself, or should he make a claim to the insurance company?”. Hence, an insurance customer prefers to choose self-financing an occurred loss by carrying a small loss himself in order to avoid an increased future premium, instead of financing the loss by compensation from the insurance company. This strategy is called bonus hunger of the insurance customer. In this strategy, the insurance customer prefers the most profitable financial alternative, after a loss occurrence. A well-designed bonus–malus system must take bonus hunger into consideration.

== Executive compensation ==
In executive compensation, particularly at banks, bonus–malus refers to schemes where annual bonuses are held in escrow (do not immediately vest), and can be reduced retroactively (clawed back) in case of losses in future years.

The intention is to align incentives better and encouraging a long-term view in directors, by discouraging the taking of risks which may yield short-term profits (and hence bonuses in early years) but with long-term losses (which, under a traditional bonus system, would not be penalized).

Such a system was proposed by Raghuram Rajan in January 2008.

Author Jim Collins proposed that executives be expected to buy stock with their own money (as was done at IBM in the 1990s) taking on both up-side rewards and down-side risk.

In November 2008, UBS AG announced a change to its executive compensation scheme implementing such a system, which it dubbed a "bonus–malus" system.

== French insurance price calculation ==
In France, the prices of insurance are calculated as a function of the car type, subscribed insurance options, and also bonus/malus value (%), stating how many years the driver used the car without any accident or another event relevant to the insurance. It means that the bonus/malus is assigned to the insured person and also to family members (e.g. spouse), who are allowed to drive the car. The bonus can be transferred between insurance companies.

Bonus reduction Coefficient (CRM)
Year of insurance	Insurance discount coefficient (Bonus)	Insurance discount ("bonus")	Bonus for professionals	Insurance discount for professionals
0	1.00	0%	1.00	0%
1	0.95	5%	0.93	7%
2	0.90	10%	0.86	14%
3	0.85	15%	0.79	21%
4	0.80	20%	0.73	27%
5	0.76	24%	0.67	33%
6	0.72	28%	0.62	38%
7	0.68	32%	0.57	43%
8	0.64	36%	0.53	47%
9	0.60	40%	0.50	50%
10	0.57	43%		
11	0.54	46%		
12	0.51	49%		
13	0.50	50%		

== French taxation ==
In France, cars are taxed (malus) or credited (bonus) if their carbon emissions are above or below certain targets. The limits (can) change every year.

=== French registration document (carte grise) ===
The environmental tax is also applied as a malus, to all vehicles newly registered after 1 January 2008, affecting all passenger cars emitting more than 109 g of CO_{2} per kilometer emissions (as of 2020). This tax is paid when the registration document (called « carte grise » in French language) is done.

Currently, the certificate holder must pay a penalty to the registration, according to the following rates (2020):

- < 110 g/km : no malus
- 110 g/km : malus of 50 euros
- 111 g/km : malus of 75 euros
- 112 g/km : malus of 100 euros
- 113 g/km : malus of 125 euros
- 114 g/km : malus of 150 euros
- 115 g/km : malus of 170 euros
- 116 g/km : malus of 190 euros
- 117 g/km : malus of 210 euros
- 118 g/km : malus of 230 euros
- 119 g/km : malus of 240 euros
- 120 g/km : malus of 260 euros
- ...
- 140 g/km : malus of 1 901 euros
- 150 g/km : malus of 3 784 euros
- 160 g/km : malus of 6 724 euros
- 170 g/km : malus of 10 980 euros
- 180 g/km : malus of 16 810 euros
- > 184 g/km : malus of 20 000 euros

Further taxes may apply according to vehicle classification.
