= Canton of Dieppe-Ouest =

Coordinates: 49.9333°N 1.0833°E

Dieppe-Ouest
- Former canton
- Interactive map of Dieppe-Ouest
- Country: France
- Region: Normandy
- Department: Seine-Maritime
- No. of communes: {{{nbcomm}}}
- Disbanded: 2015
- Population (2012): 19,048

The Canton of Dieppe-Ouest is a former canton situated in the Seine-Maritime département and in the Haute-Normandie region of northern France. It was disbanded following the French canton reorganisation which came into effect in March 2015. It consisted of part of the commune of Dieppe and had a total of 19,048 inhabitants (2012).

== Geography ==
A fishing and light industrial area in the arrondissement of Dieppe, centred on the town of Dieppe.

== See also ==
- Arrondissements of the Seine-Maritime department
- Cantons of the Seine-Maritime department
- Communes of the Seine-Maritime department
