= Sandrine Hurel =

French politician

Member of the National Assembly for Seine-Maritime
- In office 20 June 2007 – 27 August 2015
- Preceded by: Édouard Leveau
- Succeeded by: Marie Le Vern

Member of the French Senate for Seine-Maritime
- In office 1 October 2004 – 20 June 2007
- Preceded by: Alain Le Vern

Personal details
- Born: 7 August 1968 (age 57) Lisieux, France
- Party: Socialist Party
- Spouse: Alain Le Vern (m. 2009)
- Relatives: Marie Le Vern (stepdaughter)

Sandrine Hurel (born 7 August 1968 in Lisieux, Calvados) is a member of the National Assembly of France. She represents the Seine-Maritime department, and is a member of the Socialist Party and of the Socialiste, radical, citoyen et divers gauche parliamentary group.
