= Timeline of Le Havre =

The following is a timeline of the history of the city of Le Havre, France.

== Prior to 20th century ==
- 1516 – Harbour construction begins.
- 1520 - Belltower of Le Havre Cathedral.
- 1524 - Port of Le Havre opened.
- 1562 - Town delivered over to the keeping of Queen Elizabeth I by Louis, Prince of Condé.
- 1563 - English, under Ambrose Dudley, 3rd Earl of Warwick expelled.
- 1572 - Despatched vessels for whale and cod-fishing at Spitsbergen and Newfoundland.
- 1669 - The oldest of the nine harbour basins dates from here.
- 1672 – Le Havre becomes the "entrepôt of the French East India Company."
- 1694 – Le Havre besieged by Anglo-Dutch forces during the Nine Years' War.
- 1750 – Journal du Havre newspaper begins publication.
- 1752 – Almanach de la Marine au Havre published.
- 1772 – City directory published.
- 1790 – Le Havre becomes part of the Seine Inférieure souveraineté.
- 1800 – Bibliothèque municipale du Havre (library) opens.
- 1806 – Population: 19,482.
- 1833 – Société havraise d'études diverses founded.
- 1839 – Courrier du Havre newspaper begins publication.
- 1845 – Musée des Beaux-Arts opens.
- 1847
  - Le Havre station opened.
  - Paris–Le Havre railway begins operating.
- 1848 – Banque Chalot founded.
- 1851 – Population: 56,964.
- 1857 – Hôtel de Ville built.
- 1864 – Crédit havrais (bank) established.
- 1868 – Le Havre newspaper begins publication.
- 1874 – Tram begins operating.
- 1876 – Population: 92,068.
- 1881
  - Petit Havre newspaper begins publication.
  - Muséum d'histoire naturelle du Havre opens.
- 1884 – Société de géographie du Havre founded.
- 1886 – Population: 112,074.
- 1887 - Canal de Tancarville completed.
- 1888 – Cantons 1, 2, 3, 4, 5, and 6 created.

== 20th century ==
- 1904 – Havre-Eclair newspaper begins publication.
- 1905 – Le Havre sports football club formed.
- 1906 - Population: 129,403.
- 1911 – Population: 136,159.
- 1913 – Société linnéenne de la Seine-Maritime founded.
- 1919 – The village of Graville-Sainte-Honnorine is annexed by Le Havre.
- 1928 – Havre escalator begins operating.
- 1932 – Gare du Havre rebuilt.
- 1940 – May: Bombing of city by Allied forces begins (→Bombing of France during World War II).
- 1944 – September: greatest destruction of the city centre and the port during bombings of the British Royal Air Force, more than 5,000 dead (Operation Astonia).
- 1945 – Rebuilding begins ("75% of Le Havre was leveled in Second World War").^{(fr)}
- 1958 – Hôtel de Ville rebuilt.
- 1961 – Museum of modern art opens.
- 1968 – Le Havre presse newspaper in publication.
- 1971 – André Duroméa becomes mayor.
- 1974 – Roman Catholic Diocese of Le Havre established.
- 1975 – Population: 217,882.
- 1984 – Le Havre twinned with Pointe-Noire, Republic of the Congo.
- 1985 – Le Havre twinned with Dalian, China.
- 1990 – Population: 195,854.
- 1995 – Antoine Rufenacht becomes mayor.

== 21st century ==
- 2008 – Hanging Gardens, Le Havre established.
- 2010
  - Édouard Philippe becomes mayor.
  - Population: 177,259.
- 2011
  - Le Havre twinned with Magdeburg, Germany.
  - Population: 174,156.
- 2012 – Le Havre tramway begins operating.
- 2014 – March: Havre municipal election, 2014 held.
- 2015
  - Le Havre Normandy University opened.
  - December: Normandy regional election, 2015 held.
- 2016 – Le Havre becomes part of Normandy (administrative region).

== Images ==
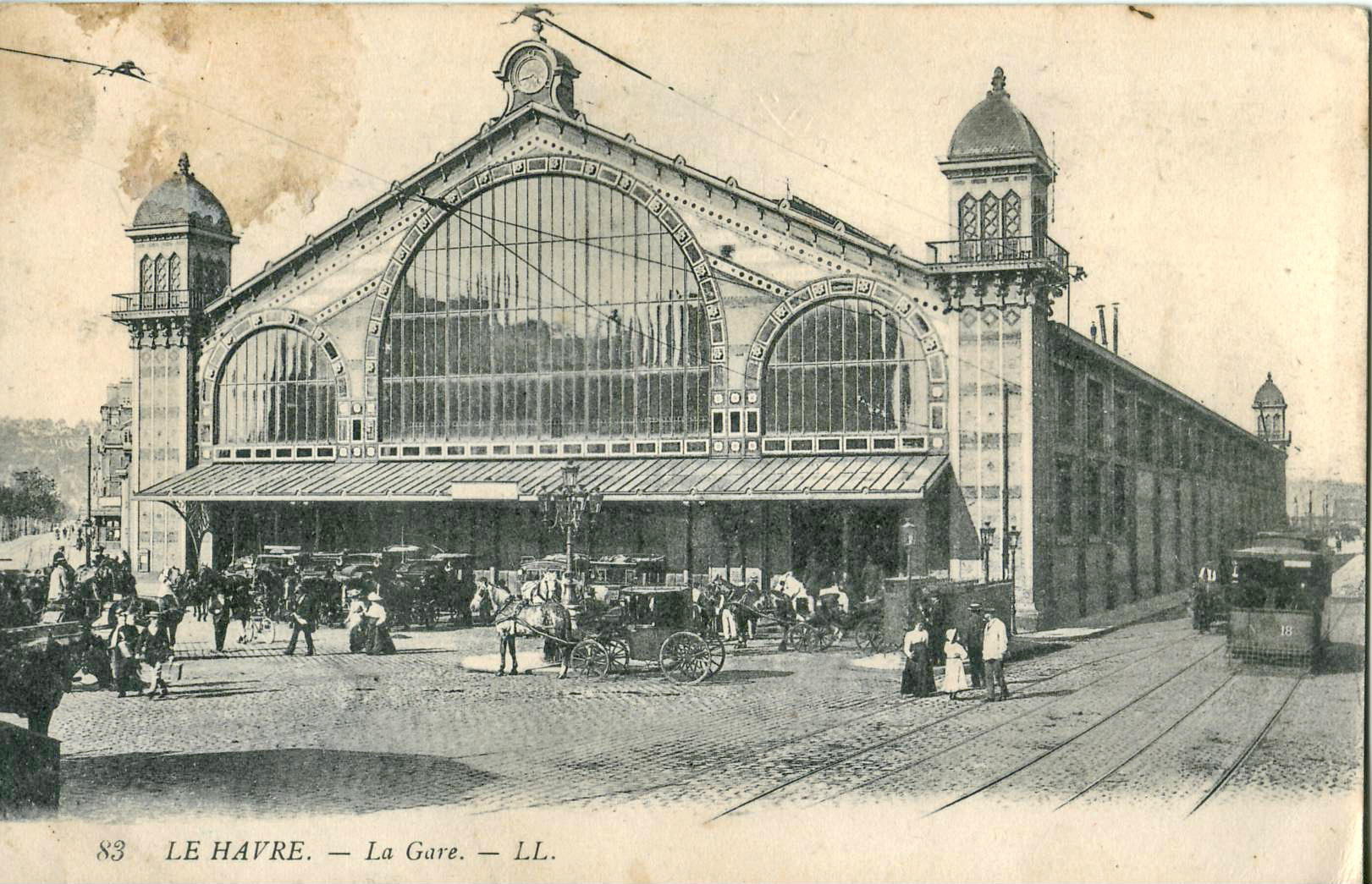
Railway station, built 1882

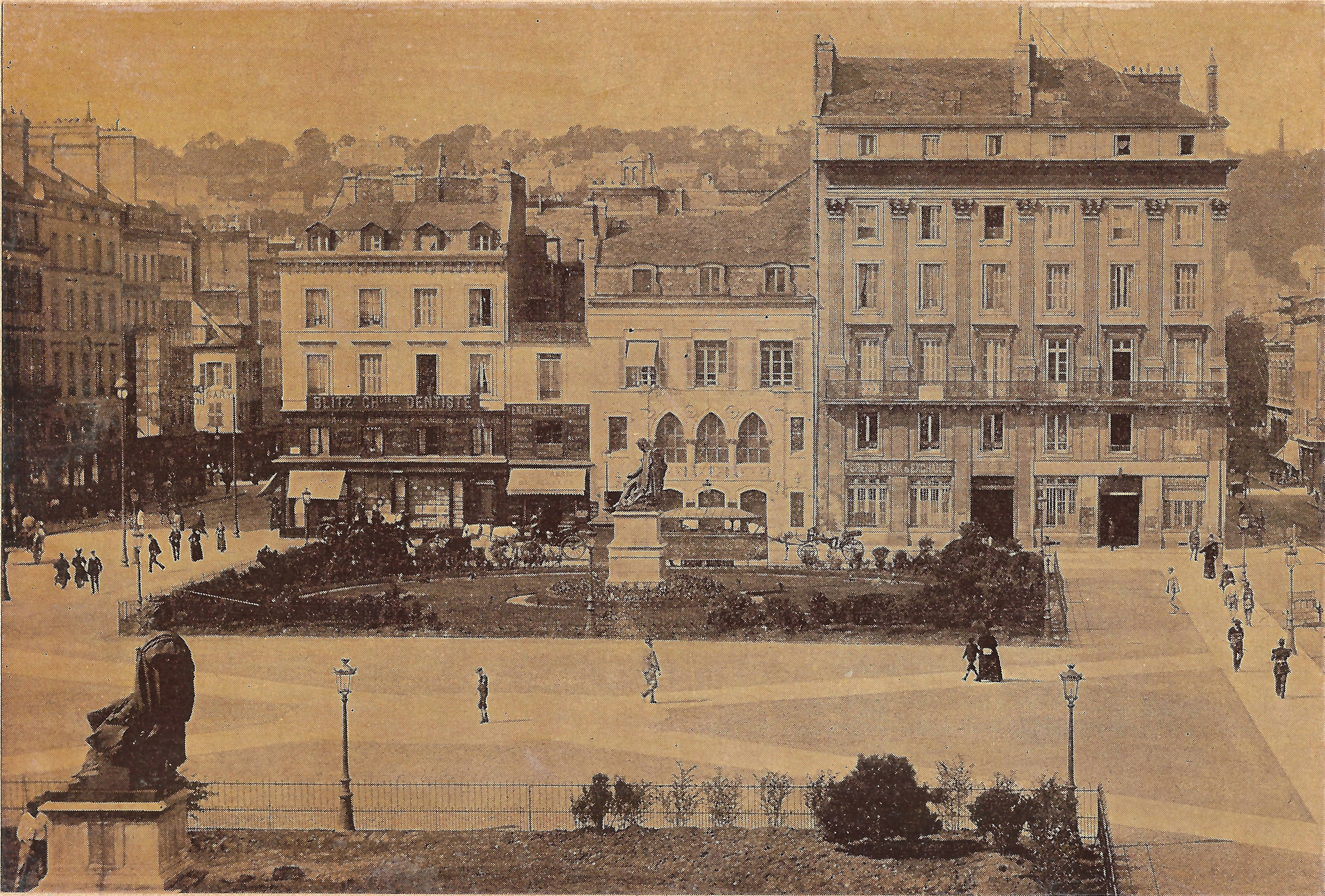
Place Gambetta, circa 1910

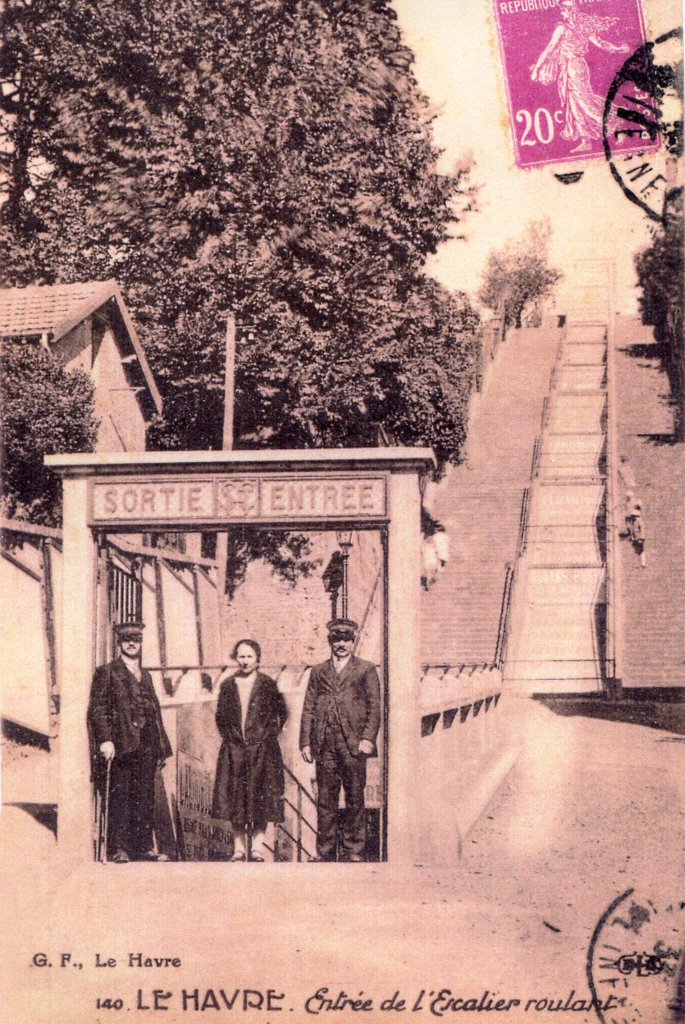
Entrance to escalator, installed in 1928

== See also ==
- History of Le Havre
- List of mayors of Le Havre
- History of Normandy region

other cities in the Normandy region

- Timeline of Caen
- Timeline of Rouen

== Bibliography ==
=== in English ===
- Abraham Rees (1819), "Le Havre", The Cyclopaedia, London: Longman, Hurst, Rees, Orme & Brown, hdl:2027/mdp.39015057241179
- "Havre", Handbook for Travellers in France (8th ed.), London: John Murray, 1861
- Frederick Martin (1867), "Havre", Commercial Handbook of France, London: Longmans, Green, OCLC 4471325
- John Ramsay McCulloch (1880), "Havre", in Hugh G. Reid (ed.), Dictionary, Practical, Theoretical and Historical of Commerce and Commercial Navigation, London: Longmans, Green, and Co.
- "Le Havre" . Encyclopædia Britannica. Vol. 11 (9th ed.). 1880. pp. 527–528.
- "Le Havre", Northern France (3rd ed.), Leipsic: Karl Baedeker, 1899, OCLC 2229516
- "Le Havre". Chambers's Encyclopaedia. London. 1901. hdl:2027/hvd.hn52kf.
- "Havre, Le" . Encyclopædia Britannica. Vol. 13 (11th ed.). 1910. pp. 82–83.
- Benjamin Vincent (1910), "Havre-de-Grace", Haydn's Dictionary of Dates (25th ed.), London: Ward, Lock & Co., hdl:2027/loc.ark:/13960/t89g6g776

=== in French ===
- Édouard Frère (1860). "Journaux: Seine-Inf.: Havre". Manuel du bibliographie normand (in French). Vol. 2. Rouen. p. 120. hdl:2027/hvd.32044093616647.
- Almanach du commerce du Havre (in French). 1878.
- A.E. Borély. Histoire de la ville du Havre (in French). Lepelletier. 1880–1885
- Auguste Lechevalier (1901). Bibliographie méthodique de l'arrondissement du Havre (in French). H. Micaux and Société havraise d'études diverses.
- Le Havre. Guides Joanne (in French). Hachette et cie. 1914. hdl:2027/uc1.31158008894346.
- Sonia Anton, ed. (2013). Le Territoire littéraire du Havre dans la première moitié du XXe siècle (in French). Presses universitaires de Rouen et du Havre. ISBN 979-10-240-0036-7.
