= History of Le Havre =

City history

Le Havre was founded on 8 October 1517 as a new port by royal command of Francis I of France, partly to replace the historic harbours of Harfleur and Honfleur which had become increasingly impractical due to silting-up. The city was originally named Franciscopolis after the king, and was subsequently renamed Le Havre-de-Grâce ("Harbour of Grace") after an existing chapel of Notre-Dame-de-Grâce ("our Lady of Grace"). The name of the American city of Havre de Grace, Maryland, is inspired by this name.

== Before Francis I ==
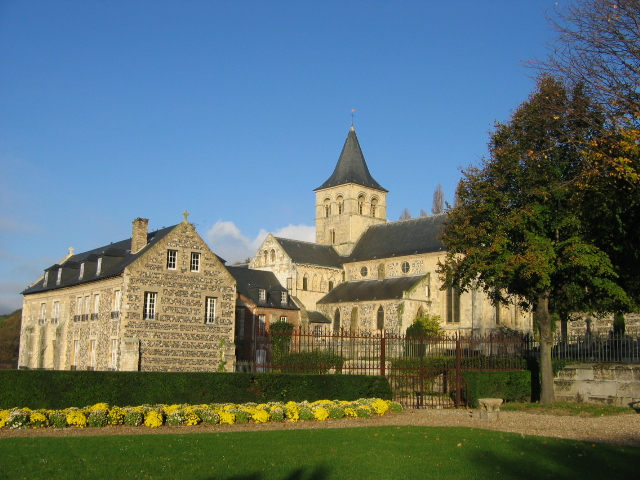
Graville Abbey is the oldest building in Le Havre

Human presence on the territory of Le Havre dates back to Prehistory around 400,000 BC.

Many remains from the Neolithic period have been excavated in the lower city and the Montgeon Forest: it is at this time that the population increased and settled down in the first hamlets. During the Iron Age Celtic people from Caletes settled in the region. From ancient times river traffic on the Seine supported Gallo-Roman cities of the estuary. A Roman road linked Lillebonne (Juliobona) at the mouth of the Seine through the current territory of the commune of Le Havre.

The first mention of Graville Abbey was in the 9th century, about Sanvic on the plateau. The village of Leure and its commercial port appear in the 11th century. It served as a shelter for ships awaiting the tide to enter the port of Harfleur upstream. It was at this time that William Malet, companion of William the Conqueror built himself a castle at Graville and a Motte-and-bailey castle in Aplemont. Several hamlets of fishermen and farmers, the first parishes emerged in the High Middle Ages. During the Hundred Years War the fortified ports Leurre and Harfleur were destroyed. At the beginning of the 16th century, the growth of trade, the silting-up of the port of Harfleur, and the fear of an English landing pushed the king Francis I of France to found the port of Le Havre and the town.

== The foundation of Le Havre ==
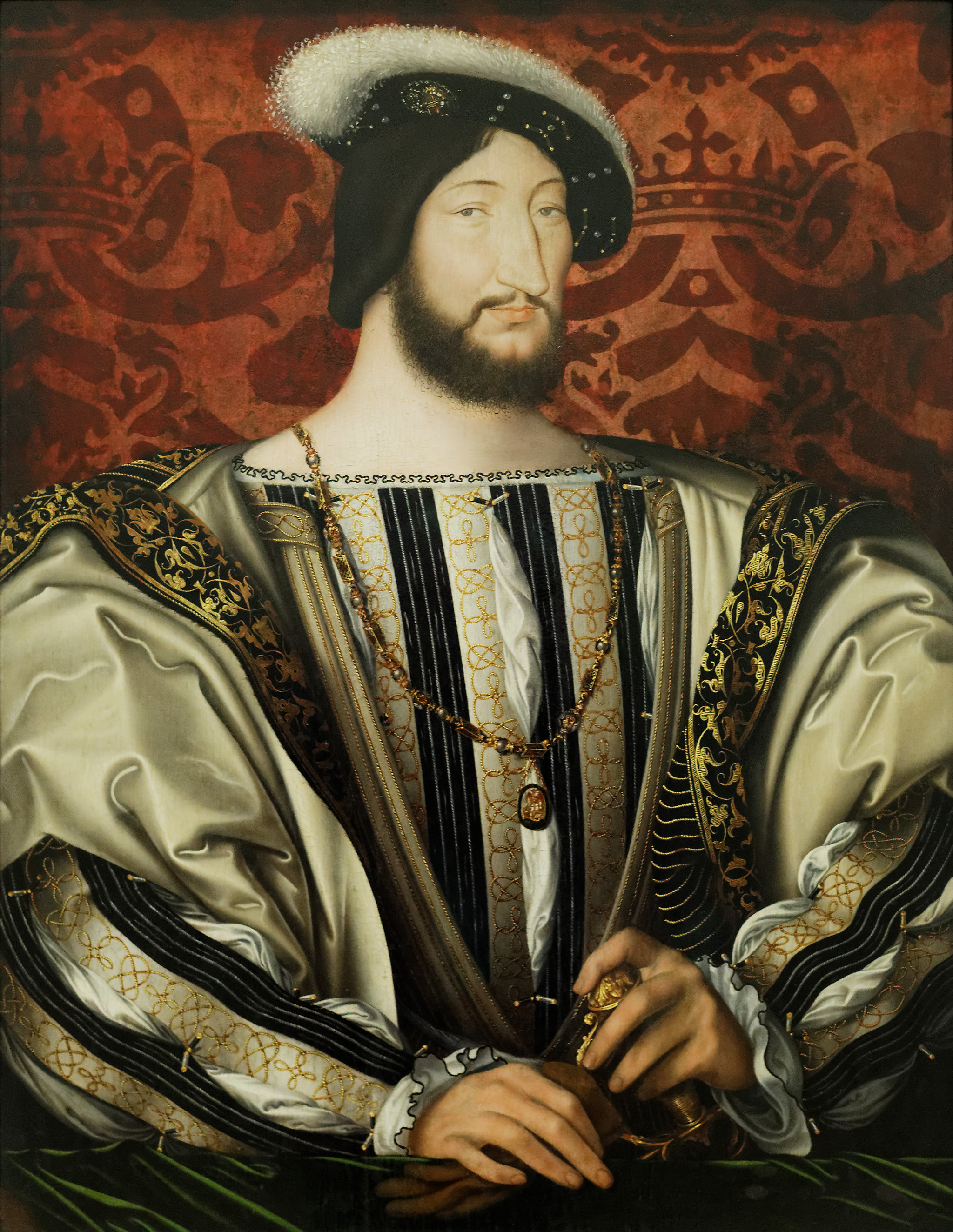
King Francis I of France, founder of Le Havre.

On 8 October 1517, King Francis I signed the founding charter of the port the plans of which are first assigned to Vice Admiral Guyon le Roy. The "big tower" defended the entrance. Despite difficulties associated with marshland and storms, the port of Le Havre welcomed its first ship in October 1518. The king himself travelled there in 1520 and granted in perpetuity the privileges of Le Havre and gave them his own arms consisting of a salamander. The military function was also encouraged: Le Havre was an assembly point for the French fleet during the wars. Ships also went fishing for cod in Newfoundland.

In 1525, a storm caused the death a hundred people, destroyed 28 fishing boats and the Chapel of Notre Dame. In 1536 the chapel was rebuilt in wood with stone pillars under the direction of Guillaume de Marceilles. A gothic tower with a large octagonal spire was added in 1540. The same year Francis I entrusted the planning and fortification project with Italian architect Girolamo Bellarmato. He had full power and organized the neighbourhood of Saint-François according to specific standards (grid plan, limiting the height of the houses, etc.). The first school and the granary were erected. The 1550s saw the creation of several municipal institutions: the town hall, the Amirauté (court of Justice), the hospital, the seat of the Viscounty and of the bailiwick.

The New World attracted adventurers and some left from Le Havre such as Villegagnon who founded a colony in Brazil (Fort Coligny) in 1555. At the end of the 16th century, trade expanded quickly and Le Havre saw the arrival of American products like leather, sugar, and tobacco. One of the main players in the traffic was an explorer and cartographer Guillaume Le Testu (1509–1573): a dock in Le Havre still bears his name.

On 20 April 1564 Le Havre became the port of departure for the French expedition of René Goulaine de Laudonnière to the New World where he created the first French colony at Fort Caroline near present-day Jacksonville, Florida. Famed artist Jacques le Moyne de Morgues joined Laudonnière on this colonizing effort and created the first known artistic depictions by a European of Native Americans in the New World, specifically the Timucua tribes in the modern-day areas of northeast Florida and southeast Georgia.

== The wars of religion ==
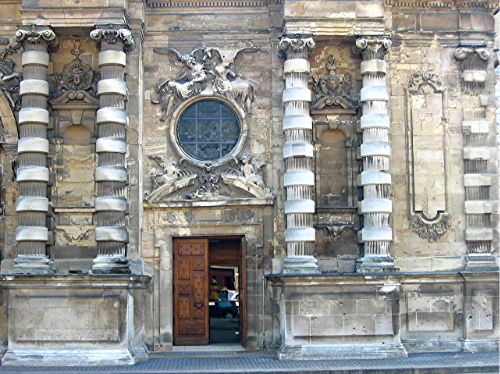
Detail of the façade of Le Havre Cathedral.

The Protestant Reformation experienced relative success in Normandy. From 1557, John Venable, library colporteur from Dieppe disseminated in Pays de Caux and Lower Normandy the writings of Martin Luther and John Calvin.

Le Havre was greatly impacted by the Wars of Religion: On 8 May 1562 the reformers took the city, looted churches, and expelled Catholics. Fearing a counter-attack by the royal armies, they turned to the English who sent their troops. The occupants of the city built fortifications under the Treaty of Hampton Court. The troops of Charles IX, commanded by Anne de Montmorency, attacked Le Havre and the English were finally expelled on 29 July 1563. The fort built by the English was destroyed and the tower of the Cathedral of Notre-Dame was lowered on the orders of the King. He then ordered the construction of a new citadel which was completed in 1574. New fortifications were established between 1594 and 1610. In 1581 the construction began of a canal between Harfleur and the estuary of the Seine.

The first purpose-built Protestant church was constructed in Le Havre in 1600 in the district of Sanvic at 85 rue Romain Rolland. It was destroyed in 1685 on the revocation of the Edict of Nantes by Louis XIV. It was not until 1787 and the Edict of Versailles of King Louis XVI that Le Havre reopened a Protestant place of worship in the district of Saint-François.

== The 17th and 18th centuries ==
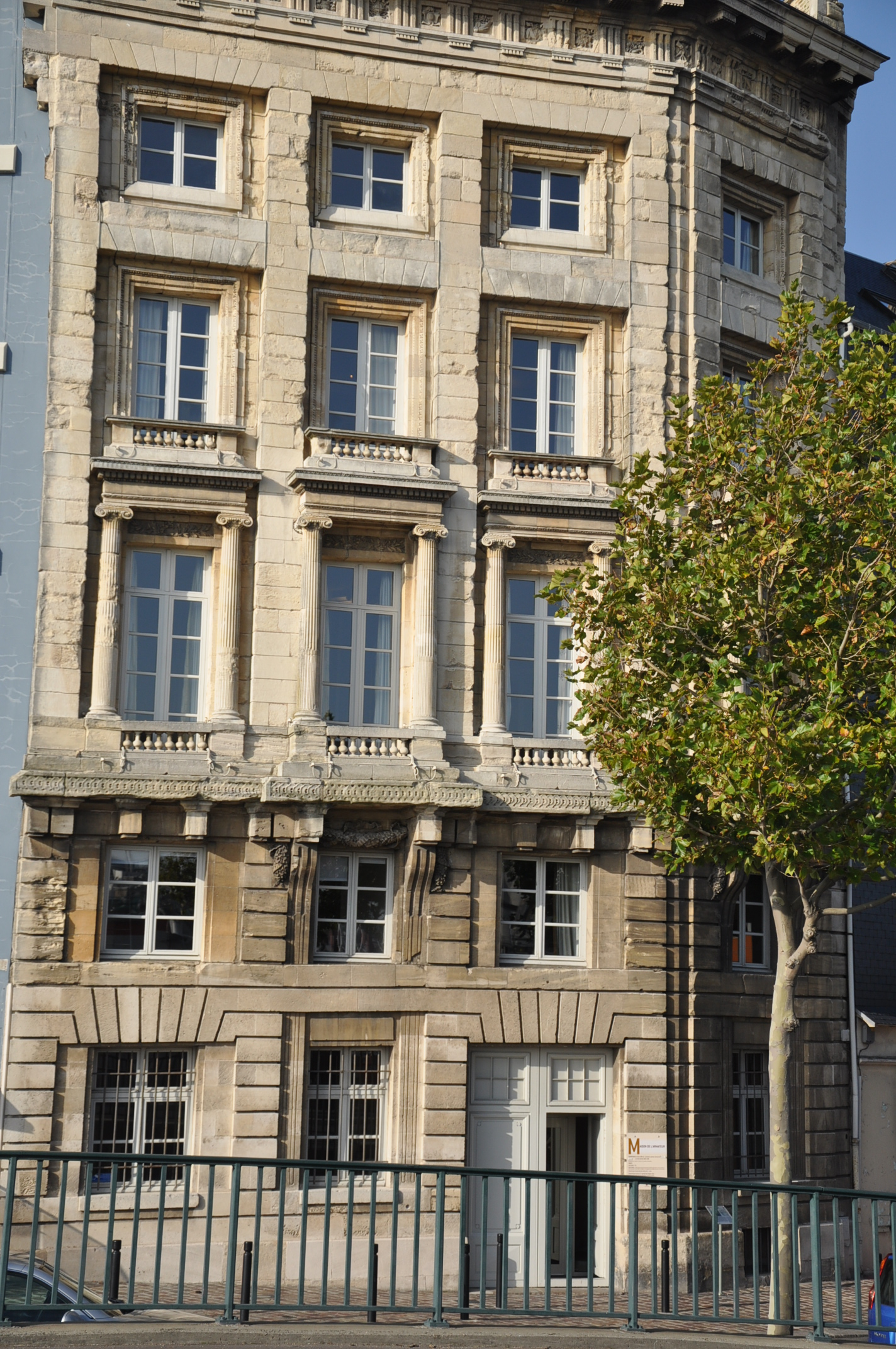
A Ship-Owner's House (18th century).

The defense function of Le Havre was reaffirmed and modernization of the port began in the 16th century on the orders of Cardinal Richelieu, governor of the city: the arsenal and the Roy Basin were developed, the walls were reinforced and a fortress built. It was in the latter that Cardinal Mazarin imprisoned the Fronde princes, Longueville, Conti, and Condé. At the beginning of the reign of Louis XIV, Colbert decided to renovate the port infrastructure and military: the work lasted 14 years. In 1669, the Minister inaugurated the Havre to Harfleur canal which is also called the "canal Vauban".

Le Havre affirmed its maritime and international calling during the 17th century: the Company of the Orient settled there in 1643. There were imports of exotic products from America (sugar, cotton, tobacco, coffee, and various spices). The slave trade enriched local traders especially in the 18th century. With 399 slave trade expeditions in the 17th and 18th centuries, Le Havre was the third largest French slave trade port after Nantes and La Rochelle. Maritime trade however is subject to international relations and a European context: the wars of Louis XIV and Louis XV momentarily interrupted the development of Le Havre. The Anglo-Dutch bombarded the city several times, notably in 1694 and in 1696.

In 1707 Michel Dubocage, a Captain from Le Havre, explored the Pacific Ocean aboard the Discovery and reached the Clipperton Island. Upon his return to Le Havre, he made his fortune by setting up a trading house and bought a mansion (now a Museum) in the heart of the Saint-François district and the lordship of Bléville. Another Captain from Le Havre Jean-Baptiste d'Après de Mannevillette (1707–1780) worked for the East India Company and mapped the coasts of India and China.

From the middle of the 18th century wealthy traders were building homes on the coast. In 1749 Madame de Pompadour wanted to see the sea and Louis XV chose Le Havre to satisfy her desire. The visit was ruinous to the city's finances.

In 1759, the city was the staging point for a planned French invasion of Britain – thousands of troops, horses and ships being assembled there – only for many of the barges to be destroyed in the Raid on Le Havre and the invasion to be abandoned following the naval defeat at the Battle of Quiberon Bay.

The economic boom of Le Havre resulted in an increase of its population (18,000 inhabitants in 1787) but also resulted in changes to the port and the city: the installation of a Tobacco Factory in the Saint-François district, the expansion of the shipyards, a new arsenal, and a commodity exchange. During a visit in 1786 Louis XVI approved the project to extend the city and it was François Laurent Lamandé he chose to take on the task of quadrupling the size of the city.

== The French Revolutionary Period (1789–1815) ==
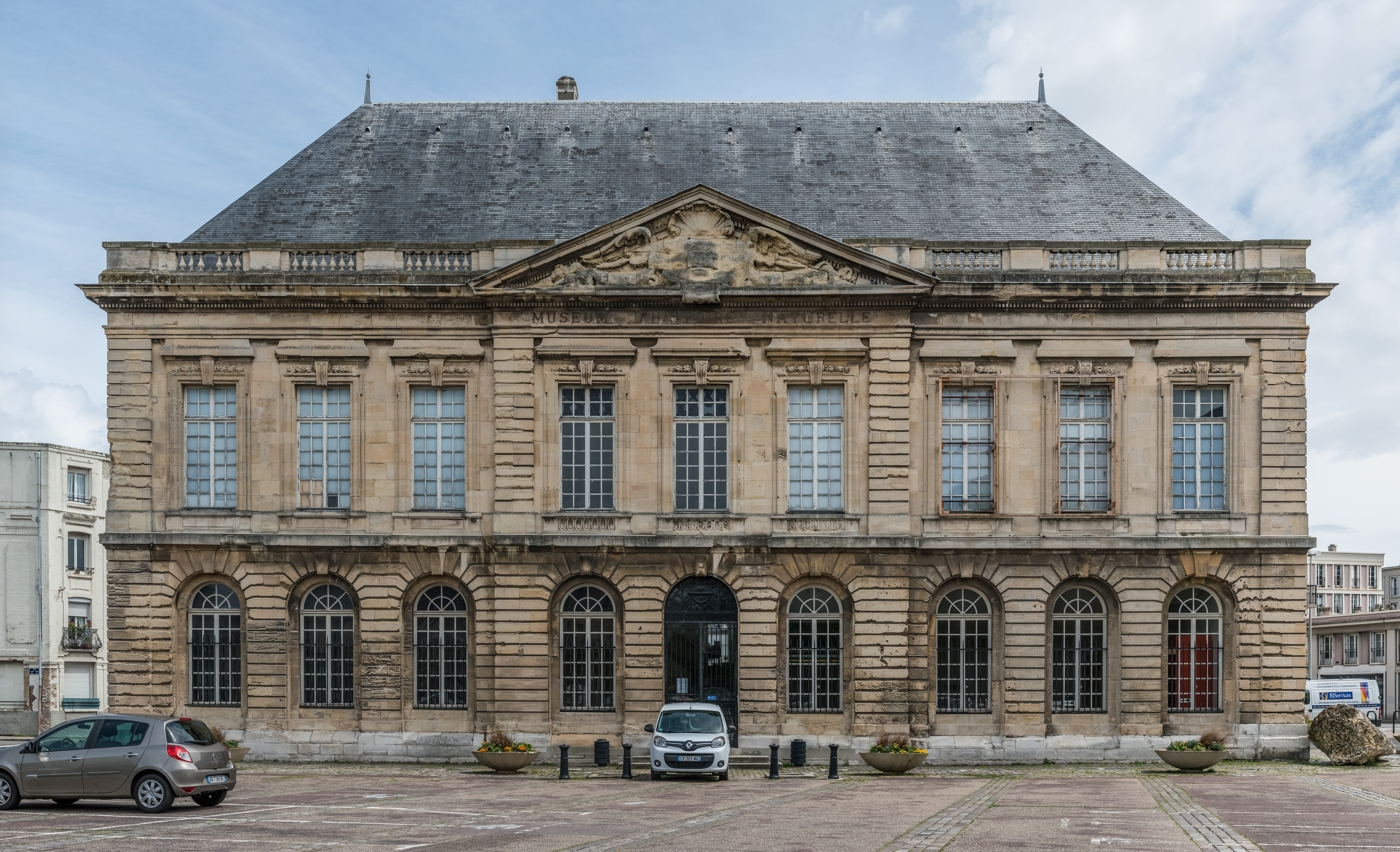
The 18th century Museum of Natural History at Le Havre was previously the Palace of Justice.

Between 1789 and 1793 the port of Le Havre was the second largest in France after that of Nantes. The Triangular trade continued until the war and its abolition. The port remained strategic because of the grain trade (supply of Paris) and its closeness to the British enemy.

The national events of the French Revolution were echoed in Le Havre: delegates for the List of Grievances were elected in March 1789. Popular riots occurred in July and the National Guard was formed some time later. A mayor was elected in 1790, the year of celebration of the Fête de la Fédération. The year 1793 was difficult for France and for Le Havre because of the war, federalist insurrections, and economic stagnation. The religious Terror transformed Notre Dame Cathedral into a Temple of Reason. The city acquired the status of sub-prefecture in the administrative reform of the Year VIII (1799–1800). Under the Empire Napoleon I came to Le Havre and ordered the construction of forts A Chamber of Commerce was founded in 1800 but, because of the war against Britain and the continental blockade, port activity was reduced and activity of pirates increased. The population of Le Havre decreased to 16,231 inhabitants in 1815.

== The prosperity of the 19th century ==
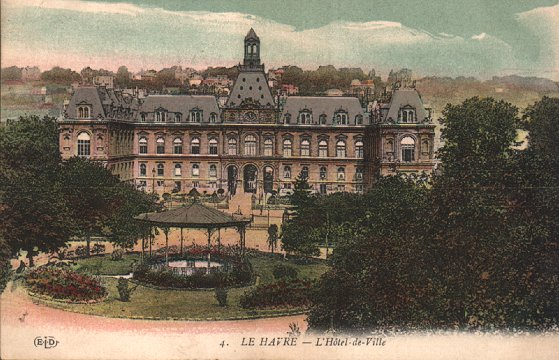
The Town Hall in 1897

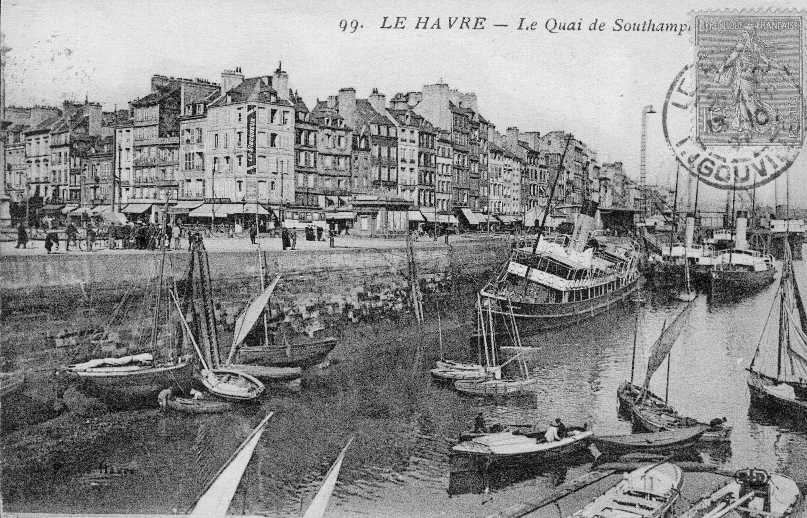
Southampton Quay in the 1920s

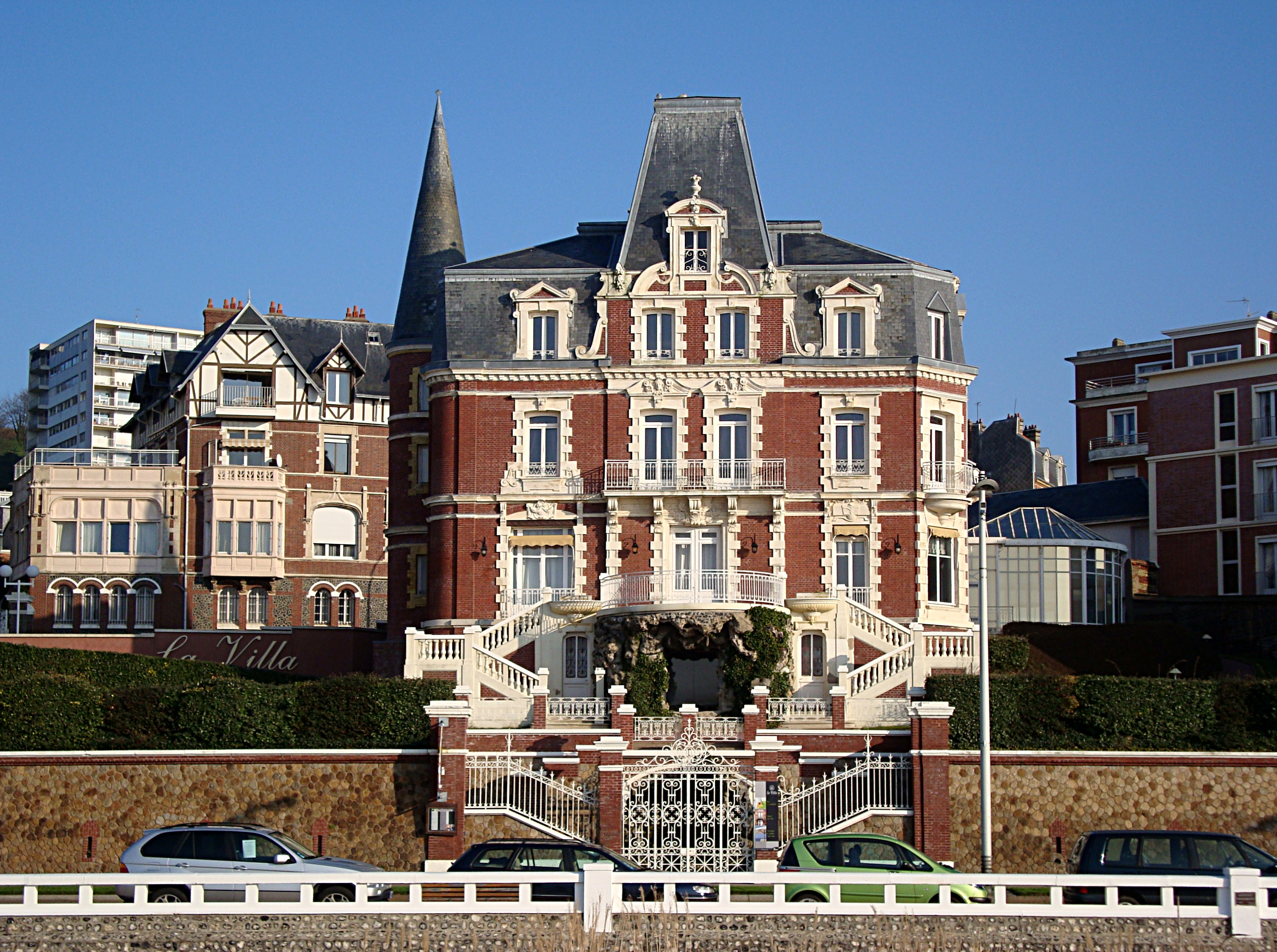
The Villa Maritime (built 1890)

The end of the Revolutionary and Napoleonic Wars allowed trade to recover normally as the British threat receded. The context of new-found peace and economic growth led to a large influx of population. Le Havre quickly outgrew its walls and new neighbourhoods appeared. Many poor were still crammed into the slum of Saint Francis. Epidemics of cholera, typhoid fever, and "fevers" caused hundreds of deaths in the years 1830–1850. Alcoholism and infant mortality wreaked havoc in the poorest classes. Throughout the 19th century, the cosmopolitan aspect of the city only strengthened: in times of maritime prosperity, the workers of the Pays de Caux were driven to Le Havre because of the crisis in the weaving industry. The implantation of a large Breton community (10% of the population Le Havre at the end of the 19th century) modified the cultural life of Le Havre. On the docks and in the factories there were Italians, Poles and North Africans. The economic success of the city attracted Anglo-Saxon, Nordic, and Alsatian entrepreneurs

The city and its port were transformed through major development work, partly funded by the state, which were spread throughout the 19th century – sometimes interrupted by political and economic crises. Several projects were completed such as construction of a new stock exchange and commercial basin in the first half of the century. There was progressive installation of gas lighting in 1835, rubbish collection (1844), and sewerage works showed a concern for urban modernization. By mid-century the old ramparts had been razed and the surrounding communities annexed to the city so the population increased sharply. The period 1850–1914 was a golden age for Le Havre. Apart from a few years of depression (the American Civil War, the Franco-Prussian War), trade exploded and the city was embellished with elegant new constructions (boulevards, city hall, courthouse, new stock exchange).

The effects of the Industrial Revolution were increasingly visible in Le Havre: the first steam dredge was used in 1831. The shipyards developed with Augustin Normand. Frederic Sauvage developed his first propeller in Le Havre in 1833. The railway arrived in 1848 which allowed the opening up of Le Havre. The docks were built in the same period as well as general warehouses. The industrial sector, however, remained in a minority in the 19th century: the plants were related to port traffic (shipyards, sugar refineries, rope factories, etc.). The banking sector developed but was still largely dependent on the outside. The city had few professionals and officials. The number of schools was inadequate even in the 1870s.

On the eve of the First World War Le Havre was the primary European port for coffee, it imported some 250,000 tonnes of cotton and 100,000 tons of oil. European cabotage brought wood, coal, Northern Europe wheat, and Mediterranean wine and oil. The abolition of the slave trade gradually caused a change in traffic. Le Havre was not only an entry for American goods but also a transit point for migrants to the USA. Transatlantic steamer travel grew in the 1830s.

Under the July Monarchy Le Havre was a Seaside resort popular with Parisians. The creation of marine baths went back to this time. It was in 1889 that the maritime boulevard was built, dominated by the Villa Maritime. The casino Marie-Christine (1910) and the Palace of Regattas (1906) brought the Bourgeoisie and the first Beach huts were installed on the beach. The end of the 19th century and of the Belle Époque, however, arrived with social tensions exacerbated by inflation and unemployment. From 1886, worker unrest, causing the Socialists to become increasingly influential, shook the city. The case of Jules Durand (a case in 1910 where Durand, secretary of a union of striking workers, was found guilty of complicity in murder) was symptomatic of this context.

== Times of War (1914–1945) ==
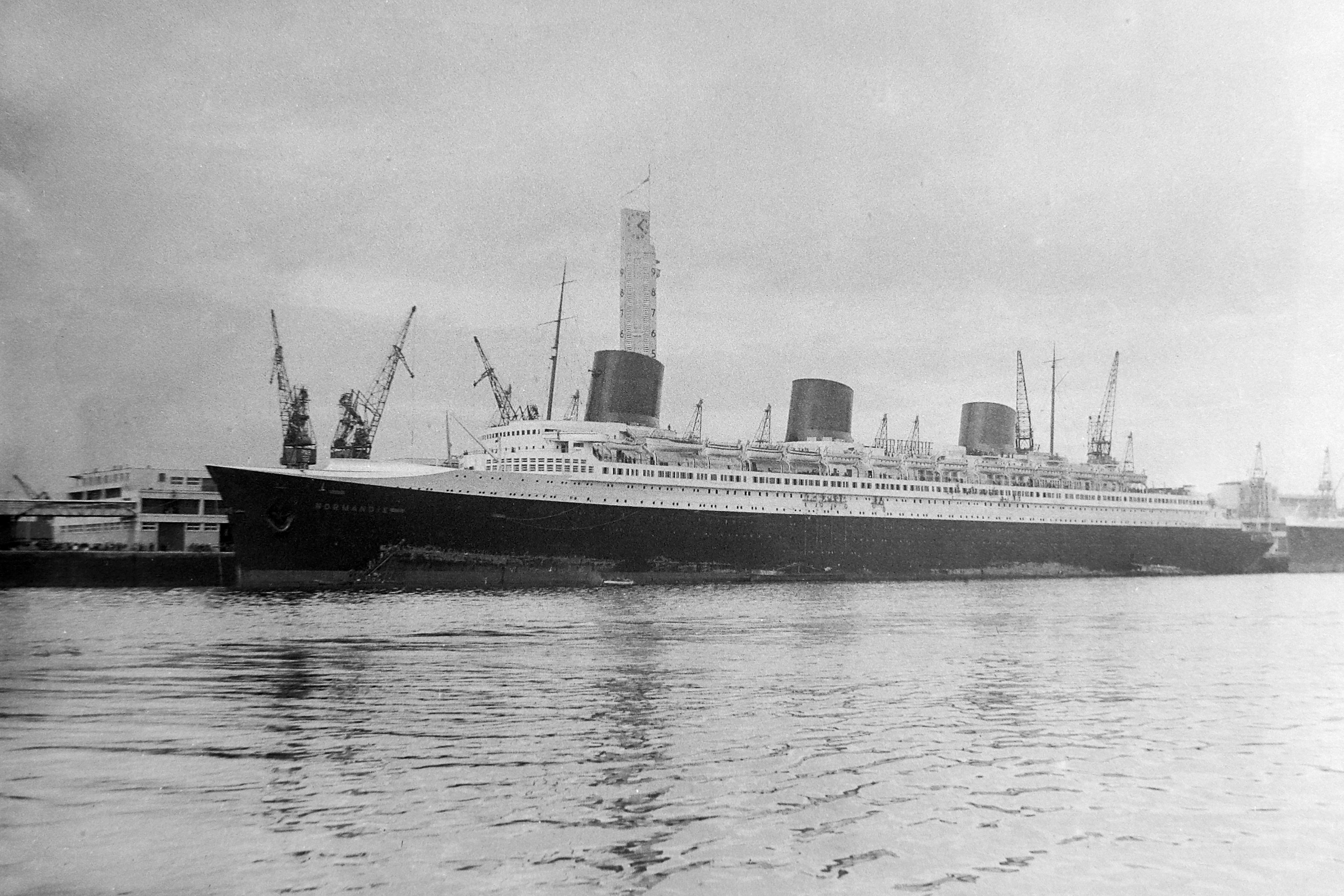
The ocean liner Normandie at the harbour of Le Havre.

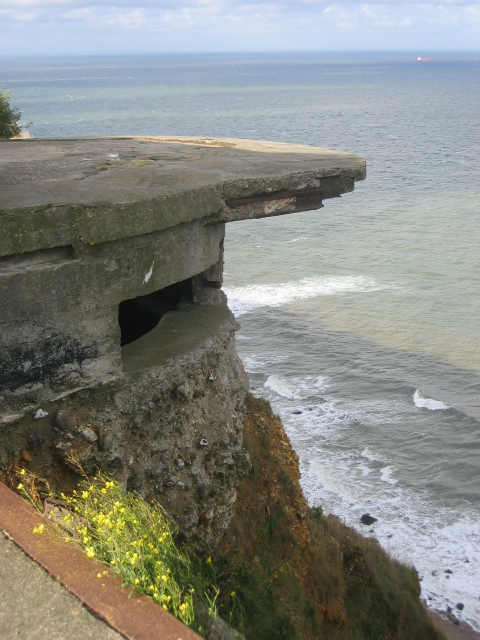
One of the blockhouses of the Atlantic Wall.

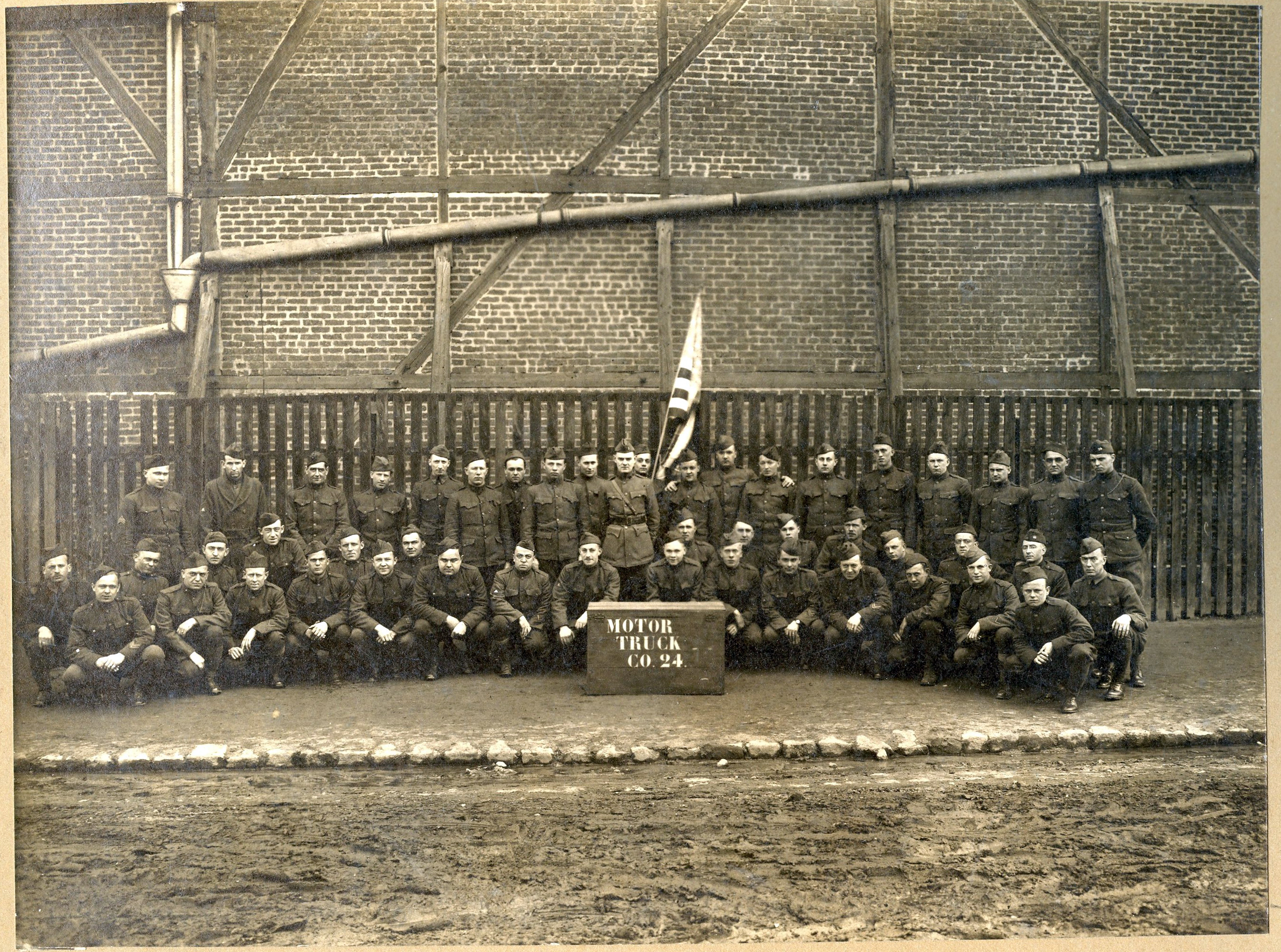
Motor Truck Co 24 in 4, Place du Vieux Marche Le havre

The human toll from the First World War was heavy for the city: Le Havre suffered about 6,000 dead, mostly soldiers who left to fight. The city was spared massive destruction as the front was much further north. Several ships were nevertheless torpedoed by German submarines in the Roadstead. One of the notable facts of the war was the installation of the Belgian government at Sainte-Adresse on the outskirts of Le Havre as they had been forced to flee the German occupation. The city served as a base for the Triple Entente especially for British warships: 1.9 million British soldiers passed through the port of Le Havre.

The Interwar period was marked by the cessation of population growth, social unrest, and economic crisis. At the end of the conflict inflation ruined many pensioners. The city became largely a workers city. Shortages and high prices caused the great strike of 1922 in which a state of emergency was declared. In 1936 the Breguet factory at Le Havre was occupied by strikers: this was the beginning of the labour movement under the Popular Front. On the economic front the strong growth seen in the second half of the 19th century seemed to be over. The ports of northern Europe seriously competed with Le Havre and major port development work slowed. Oil imports, however, continued to grow and refineries emerged east of Le Havre. The global crisis of 1929 and protectionist measures hindered the development of trade. Only the travel industry was doing relatively well, with 500,000 passengers carried in 1930. The liner Normandie began sailing to New York in 1935.

In the Second World War, German forces occupied Le Havre from the spring of 1940 causing an exodus of its population. They made a naval base in preparation for the invasion of the United Kingdom (Operation Sealion) and set up the Festung Le Havre, lined with bunkers, pillboxes and artillery batteries integrated into the Atlantic Wall. For the people of Le Havre, daily life was difficult because of shortages, censorship, bombings and political anti-Semitism: Mayor Léon Meyer was forced to leave his post because of his Jewish origins. The Le Havre resistance was built around several nodes such as the group of the high school of Le Havre or the Vagabond Bien-Aimé ("beloved vagabond"). These groups were involved with British intelligence and with acts of sabotage preceding the landings of 6 June.

Much of the population opted to evacuate at dusk by foot, bicycle or wagon, only to return during daylight hours after the Allied Forces air bombardments were over.

Le Havre suffered 132 bombings by the Allies during the war. The Nazis also destroyed the port infrastructure and sank ships before leaving the city. The greatest destruction, however, occurred on 5 and 6 September 1944 when the British Royal Air Force bombed the city centre and the port to weaken the occupier under Operation Astonia – often described as the storm of iron and fire.

The results of the bombing campaign were appalling: 5,000 deaths (including 1,770 in 1944), 75,000 to 80,000 injured, 150 hectares of land razed, 12,500 buildings destroyed. The port was also devastated and some 350 wrecks lie at the bottom of the sea. Le Havre was liberated by Allied troops on 12 September 1944.

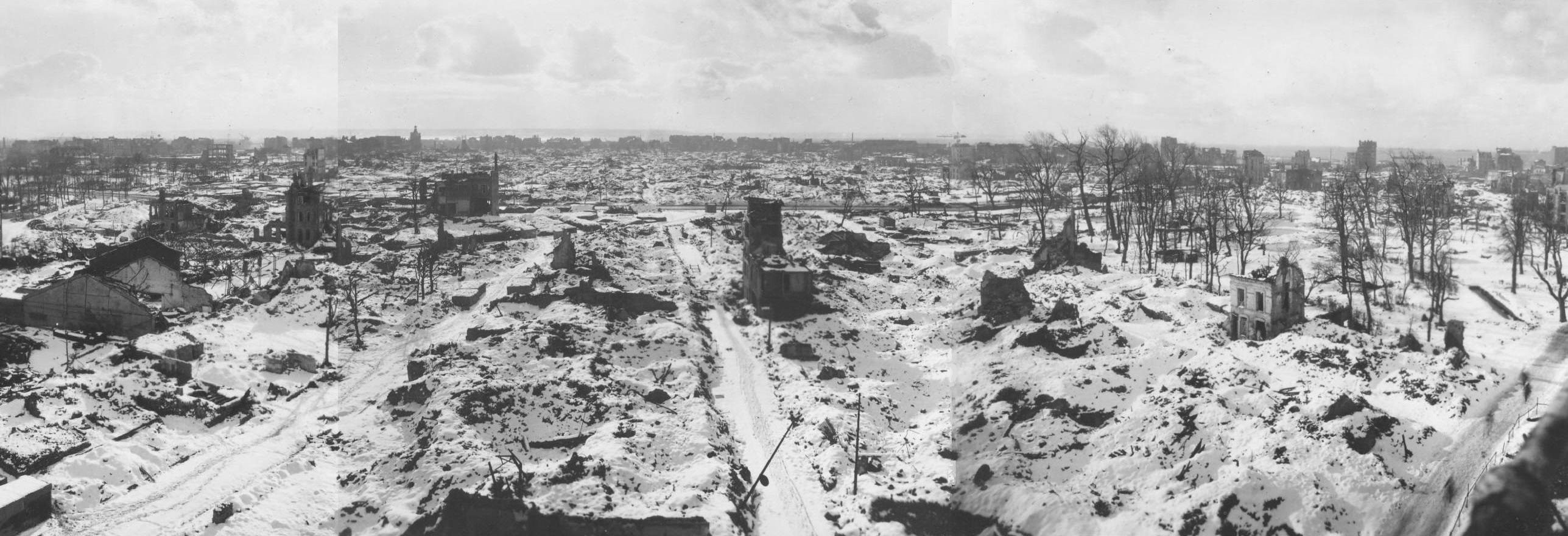
Saint-Roch square in the Saint-Joseph quarter of Le Havre in the winter of 1944–1945

Despite the extensive damage, Le Havre became the location of some of the biggest Replacement Depots, or "Repple Depples" in the European Theatre of Operations in World War II. Thousands of American replacement troops poured in the Cigarette Camps i.e. Philip Morris, Herbert Tareyton, Wings, and Pall Mall Camps, located in the vicinity of the town, before being deployed to combat operations. The port also became key to the Supply and Service Forces operations of the Communications Zone of the U.S. Army.

== Le Havre after 1945 ==
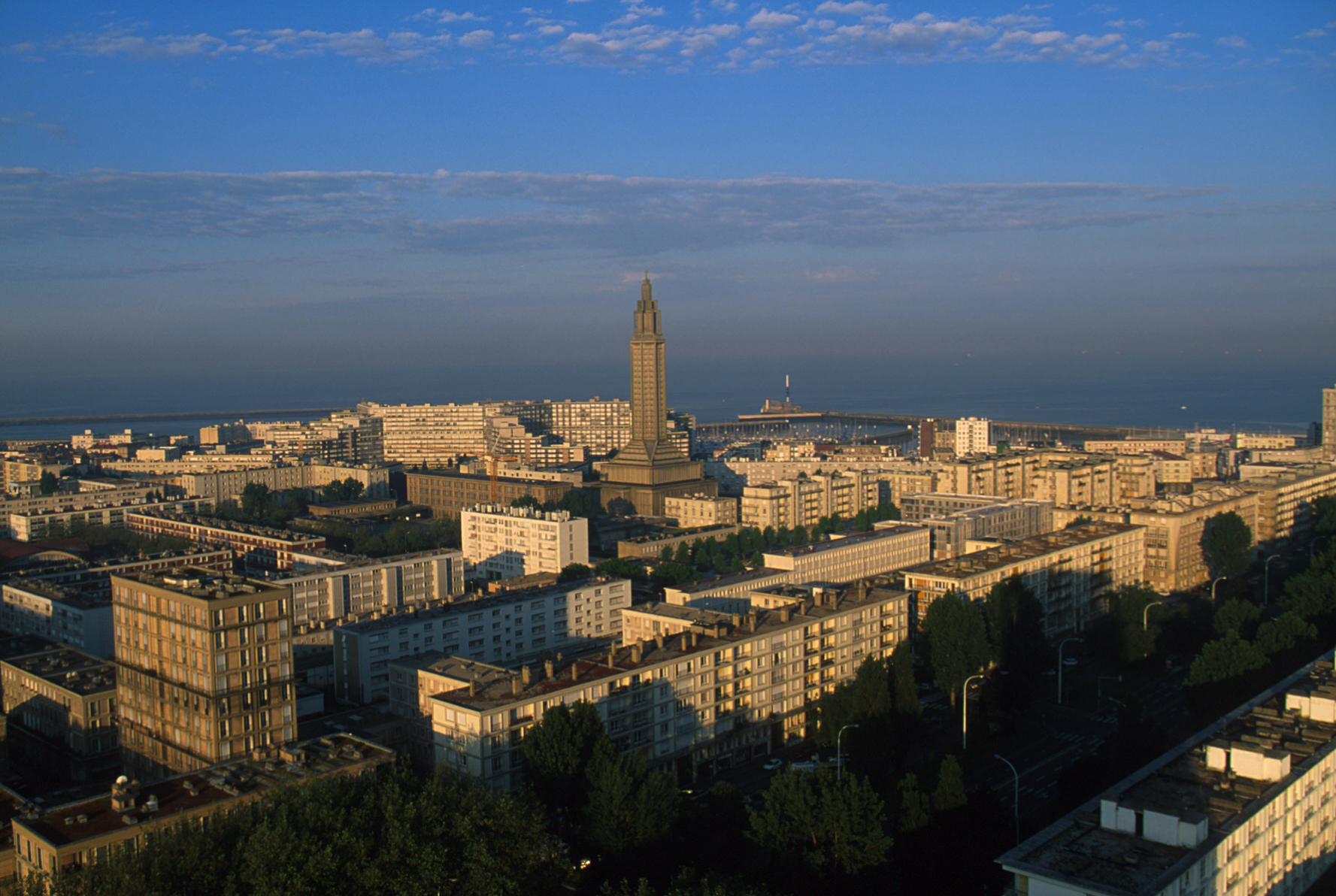
The rebuilt centre of Le Havre

General Charles de Gaulle visited Le Havre on 7 October 1944. The city received the Legion of Honour on 18 July 1949 for the "heroism with which it has faced its destruction".

In spring 1945, Raoul Dautry of the Ministry of Reconstruction and Urban Development entrusted the project to rebuild the city of Le Havre to Auguste Perret. The city council requested Brunau form part of the planning team, but subsequently he left a short time later due to creative conflicts with Perret. Perret wanted to make a clean sweep of the old structures and apply the theories of structural classicism. The material to be used for the building construction was concrete and the general plan was an orthogonal frame. Officially, the reconstruction was completed in the mid-1960s.

The triangular axis of the Boulevard François I, the Avenue Foch and Rue de Paris led the traveller north, south, east and west of the town centre. The pre-war shopping precinct of Rue de Paris was redesigned with wide footpaths. A surrounding gridiron street system allowed for opened shopping areas, far from the dense and overcrowded crannies of the old. The Place de l’Hotel de Ville, the central square, was lined with 330 apartments around the edge in varying sizes and permitted a 1000-person occupancy. At the centre of this development was the new Hôtel de Ville, completed in 1958. State funds also allowed for the building of high-rise apartments over six blocks leading into the residential areas. These new apartments possessed the latest innovations including central heating. The Avenue Foch stretched 80 metres wide, a little more than the Champs-Élysées in Paris. The finest apartments were built here facing the northern sunlight. Beyond the concrete formations of the inner township stretched the Saint-Francois neighbourhood, made up of red-brick residences and slate rooflines. Aplemont’s three-square-kilometre rebuild consisted of detached housing, double storey terraces and small apartment blocks. A church, community centre and shops also defined the new features. The inclusion of 7.7 square kilometres (3.0 sq mi) of green spaces with parks, gardens and woodlands added to the port’s urban renewal. This equates to an average of 41 square metres of green space per inhabitant, exceptional for any European city of its time. The Museum of Modern Art and the first House of Culture in the region were inaugurated in 1961 by André Malraux. The commune was enlarged through the annexation of Bleville, Sanvic, and Rouelles.

In the 1970s economic difficulties due to de-industrialization saw, for example, the closure of Ateliers et chantiers du Havre (ACH) in 1999 and transformed the trade of the port. 1974 also saw the end of the ocean liner service to New York by the France. The Energy crisis precipitated an industry slump. Since then the city has embarked on a process of restructuring mainly oriented towards the tertiary sector: opening of the University of Le Havre in the 1980s, tourism development, and modernization of the port (Port 2000 project).

UNESCO declared the city centre of Le Havre a World Heritage Site on 15 July 2005 honouring the "innovative utilisation of concrete's potential". The 133-hectare space that represented, according to UNESCO, "an exceptional example of architecture and town planning of the post-war era," is one of the rare contemporary World Heritage Sites in Europe.

== See also ==
- Timeline of Le Havre

== Bibliography ==
- Bardan, Alice. "Europe, spectrality and 'post-mortem cinema': The haunting of history in Christian Petzold's Transit (2018) and Aki Kaurismäki's Le Havre (2011)." Northern Lights: Film & Media Studies Yearbook 18.1 (2020): 115-129. online
- Barzman, John. Dockers, métallos, ménagères: Mouvements sociaux et cultures militantes au Havre (1912–1923) (Le Havre: Publications de l'Université de Rouen. 1998)
- Barzman, John. "Port labour relations in Le Havre, 1928–1947." International Journal of Maritime History 9.2 (1997): 83-106. Online
- Barzman, John, Corinne Bouillot, and Andrew Knapp. Bombardements 1944: Le Havre, Normandie, France, Europe. (Presses universitaires de Rouen et du Havre, 2016).
- Baudouin, Thierry, et al. "Le Havre in the Era of Globalization: From Port to Port City'." in North Sea Ports in Transition: Changing Tides (1998): 95-120.
- Delderfield, R. F. "Confidential Report on the Recent Bombing of Le Havre." Canadian Military History 20.4 (2011): 7+ online
- Glasgow, Tom. "The Navy In The French Wars Of Mary And Elizabeth I: Part Iii. The Navy In The Le Havre Expedition, 1562–1564." The Mariner's Mirror 54.3 (1968): 281-296.
- Gravari-Barbas, Maria. "Tourism policies in French post-2nd-World-War-reconstructed cities: Saint-Nazaire, Le Havre & Lorient." City tourism 2002: Proceedings of European Cities Tourism's International Conference in Vienna, Austria, 2002 (Springer-Verlag Wien, 2002).
- Knapp, Andrew. "The destruction and liberation of Le Havre in modern memory." War in History 14.4 (2007): 476-498.
- Shtasel, Rebecca. "Workers’ resilience in occupied France: workers in Le Havre, 1941–1942." French History 34.2 (2020): 235-252.
- Clout, Hugh. (1999) The Reconstruction of Upper Normandy: A Tale of Two Cities, Planning Perspectives, 14:2, 183-207, DOI: 10.1080/026654399364292
