= Michel Guyard =

French Catholic bishop (1936–2021)

- Bishop of Le Havre
- Installed: 9 July 2003
- Term ended: 24 June 2011
- Predecessor: Michel Saudreau
- Successor: Jean-Luc Brunin

Orders
- Ordination: 25 June 1965
- Consecration: 12 October 2003 by Jean-Marie Lustiger

Personal details
- Born: Michel Guyard; 19 June 1936 Paris, France
- Died: 23 July 2021 (aged 85) Vannes, France
- Buried: Le Havre Cathedral
- Denomination: Catholic Church
- Education: Saint-Sulpice Seminary
- Coat of arms

Michel Guyard (19 June 1936 – 23 July 2021) was a French Catholic bishop. He served as Bishop of Le Havre from 2003 to 2011.

== Biography ==
=== Formation ===
Guyard studied to be a priest at the Saint-Sulpice Seminary in Issy-les-Moulineaux. He was ordained on 25 June 1965 in the Archdiocese of Paris.

=== Principal ministries ===
Guyard began his life as a priest in several small Parisian parishes, such as the Church of St Odile and Saint-François-de-Sales Church. From 1970 to 1984, he was spiritual director of the Carmelite seminary at the Institut Catholique de Paris before being appointed to serve as a priest at the Église Saint-Jean-Baptiste de Grenelle before serving as archpriest at the Cathedral of Notre-Dame-de-Paris. He was then vicar general of the Diocese of Paris from 1994 to 2003.

On 9 July 2003, Guyard was nominated to replace Monsignor Michel Saudreau as Bishop of Le Havre. He was consecrated on 12 October 2003 by Cardinal Jean-Marie Lustiger. Within the Bishops' Conference of France, he served on the Committee of Health and subsequently became a member of the Council for Family and Social Questions. He retired on 24 June 2011 due to old age.

=== Death ===
Michel Guyard died in Vannes on 23 July 2021 at the age of 85. He will be buried on 2 August at Le Havre Cathedral.

== Public positions ==
In 2006, a telethon was held raising money for medical research using human embryos. Guyard publicly stated that, while he was in favor of medical research, he was opposed to its use of human embryos.

In 2008, Guyard and Monsignor Jean-Charles Descubes authored a document titled "Le dimanche au risque de la vie actuelle". The text pleaded for Sunday to not become a day just like any other and underlined the importance of the day to break the rhythm of the week, allowing a time for relaxation. Therefore, great opposition was expressed to the opening of shops on Sundays.
