= Diocese of Le Havre =

Diocese of the Catholic Church

Coordinates: 49°29.25′N 0°6.5′E

Diocese of Le Havre Dioecesis Portus Gratiae Diocèse du Havre

Catholic
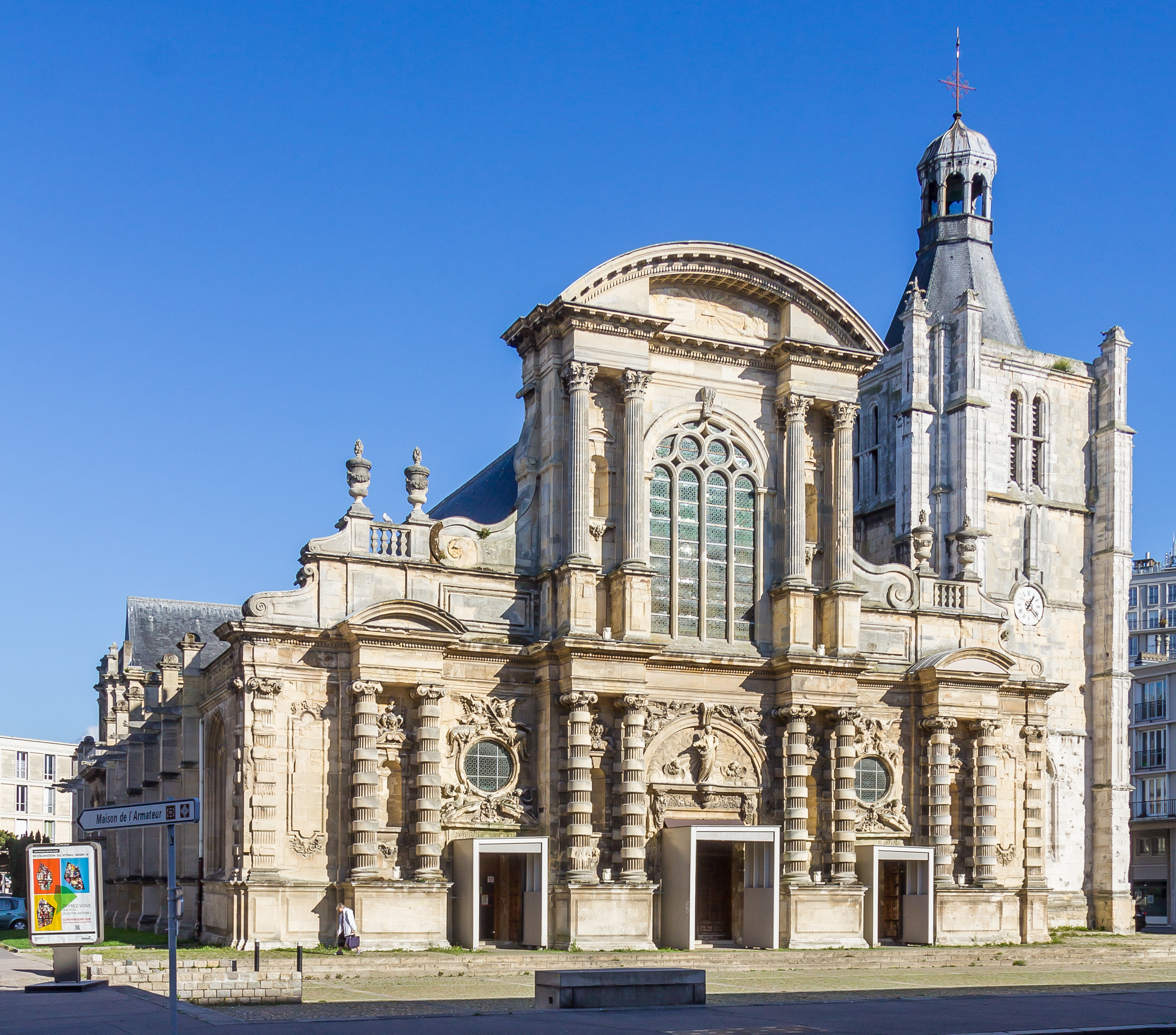
- Le Havre Cathedral

Location
- Country: France
- Ecclesiastical province: Rouen
- Metropolitan: Archdiocese of Rouen

Statistics
- Area: 1,902 km^{2} (734 sq mi)
- Population: Total; Catholics: (as of 2023); 395,930 ▲; 326,600 (est.) (82.5%)
- Parishes: 21

Information
- Denomination: Roman Catholic
- Sui iuris church: Latin Church
- Rite: Roman Rite
- Established: 6 July 1974
- Cathedral: Cathedral of Notre Dame in Le Havre
- Secular priests: 36 (Diocesan ▼); 6 (Religious Orders) ▲21 Permanent Deacons ▼

Current leadership
- Pope: Leo XIV
- Bishop: Jean-Luc Brunin
- Metropolitan Archbishop: Dominique Lebrun

Map

Website
- Website of the Diocese

The Diocese of Le Havre (Latin: Dioecesis Portus Gratiae; French: Diocèse du Havre [djɔsɛz dy ɑvʁ(ə)]) is a Latin diocese of the Catholic Church in France. Erected in 1974, the episcopal see is Le Havre Cathedral in the city of Le Havre. The diocese comprises the arrondissement of Le Havre in the department of Seine-Maritime, Normandy.

== History ==
Following the Second Vatican Council, and in accordance with the norms laid out in the council's decree, Christus Dominus chapter 40, changes were authorized and suggested in the ecclesiastical administrative structure of ecclesiastical provinces and dioceses. The situation in the archdiocese of Rouen was brought to the attention of the Congregation of Bishops in the Roman Curia, both by the archbishop and by the papal nuncio in France. The western part of the archdiocese had grown both in population and in the complexity of social interactions (urbanization, commerce, etc.) that a new diocese seemed to be desirable. After consultation with the French Episcopal Conference and others, Pope Paul VI decided to establish a new diocese.

The diocese was created from territory of the Archdiocese of Rouen, by detaching a number of communes. Its cathedral was to be the already existing church of Nôtre-Dame-du-Havre.

The new diocese of Le Havre is a suffragan to the archdiocese of Rouen.

The diocese has authorized two of its priests to conduct exorcisms.

In 2023, in the Diocese of Le Havre there was one priest for every 7,776 Catholics.

The diocese maintains (in French) a web page listing the current and planned diocesan pilgrimages.

== Bishops ==
- Michel Marie Paul Saudreau (1974–2003)
- Michel Jean Guyard (2003–2011)
- Jean-Luc Brunin (since 2011)

== See also ==
- Catholic Church in France
