= Hôtel de Ville, Le Havre =

Monuments historiques in Le Havre, France

Hôtel de Ville
- Main frontage of the Hôtel de Ville in July 2015

General information
- Type: City hall
- Architectural style: Modern style
- Location: Le Havre, France
- Coordinates: 49.4941°N 0.1078°E
- Completed: 1958

Height
- Height: 70 metres (230 ft)

Design and construction
- Architect: Auguste Perret

Monument historique
- Official name: Hôtel de Ville
- Type: Inscrit
- Designated: 2017
- Reference no.: PA76000103

The Hôtel de Ville (French pronunciation: [otɛl də vil], City Hall) is the local seat of government in Le Havre, Normandy, France. It was designated a monument historique by the French government in 2017.

== History ==
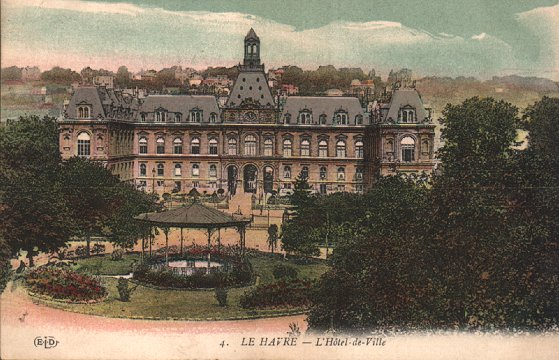
The old Hôtel de Ville

The Hôtel de Ville was commissioned to replace a 19th-century town hall, which was designed by Charles Brunet-Debaine in the Châteauesque style, built in ashlar stone and completed in 1857. It was completely destroyed by British military bombardment in September 1944 during the Second World War.

The new building was built on the site of the old town hall. It was designed by Auguste Perret in the modern style and construction began using reinforced concrete in 1953. After Perret died in February 1954, Jacques Tournant supervised the development of the design until the building was officially opened on 14 July 1958.

The design of the main block involved a symmetrical main frontage of 15 bays facing south onto Place d'Hôtel de Ville. It was fenestrated by tall casement windows on the first floor and by smaller casement windows on the second floor, all flanked by columns supporting a long entablature. The main block, which accommodated the exhibition and reception rooms, was 143 metres (469 ft) in length, and the 18-storey tower, at the west end, which accommodated the offices, was 70 metres (230 ft) high. The design was initially controversial, as some members of the city council wanted a reconstruction of the earlier city hall. The tower drew strong criticism, as such skyscrapers were considered American and not French.

A theatre, adjoining the Hôtel de Ville to the east, was inaugurated in October 1967, and a large extension to the north, designed in an unsympathetic style, was completed in 1987. By moving the car parking underground, the city council was able to create a huge garden, involving over 50,000 plants, on a site to the south of the Hôtel de Ville in 1990. Perret's redesigned city has been a UNESCO World Heritage Site since 2005.
