= Le Havre Cathedral =

Roman Catholic cathedral in Le Havre, France

Coordinates: 49°29′13″N 0°6′30″E

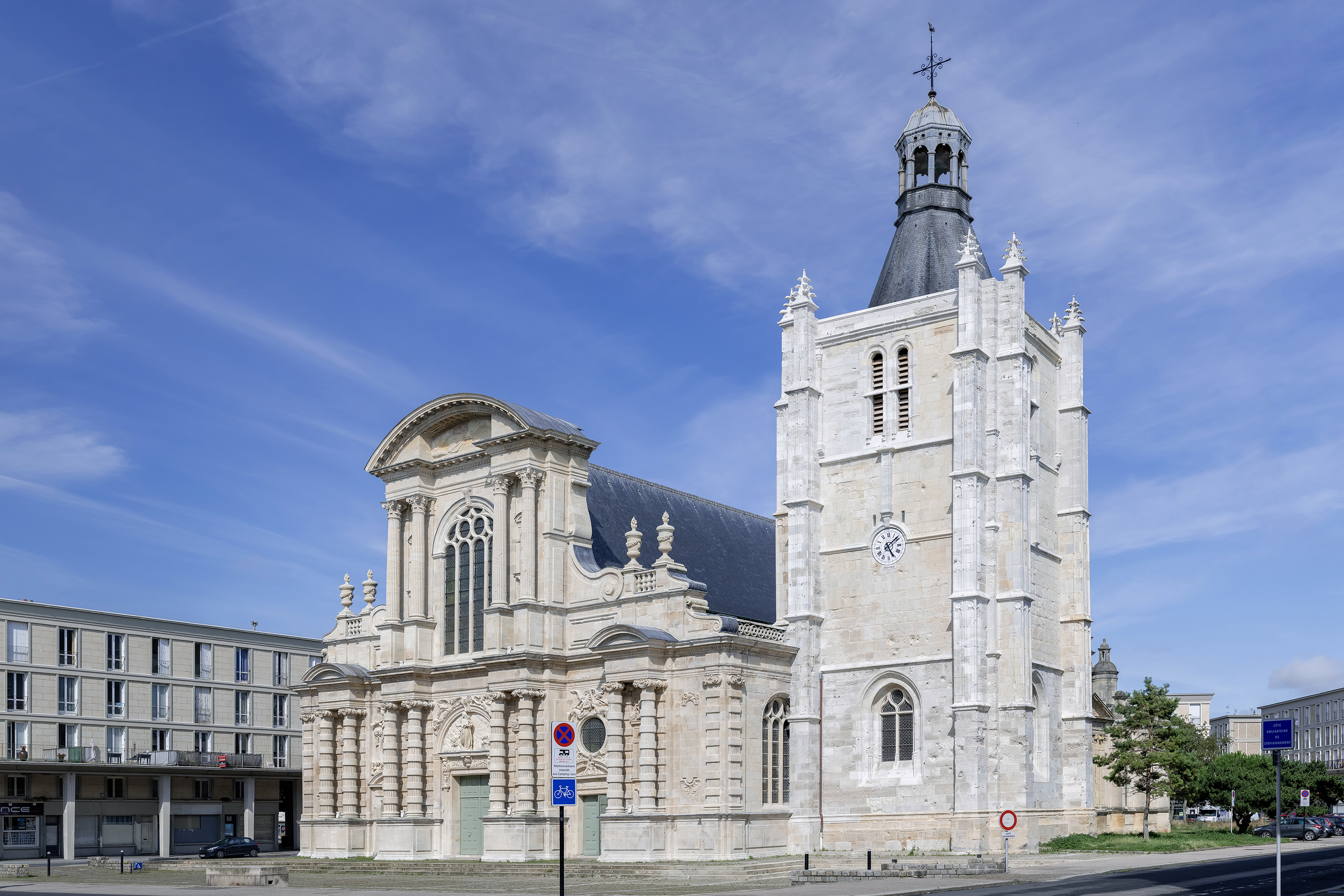
Le Havre Cathedral

Le Havre Cathedral (French: Cathédrale Notre-Dame du Havre) is a Roman Catholic church in Le Havre, France.

The cathedral was previously a parish church dating from the 16th and 17th centuries, and is the oldest of the very few buildings in central Le Havre to have survived the devastation of World War II. It became a cathedral and the seat of the Bishop of Le Havre in 1974, when the diocese of Le Havre was created.

The belltower dates from around 1520 and the main façade is Baroque. The building was kept unusually low because of the difficulties posed by the unstable ground.

The fine church organs were the gift of the Cardinal de Richelieu in 1637, when he was governor of the town.

Gallery

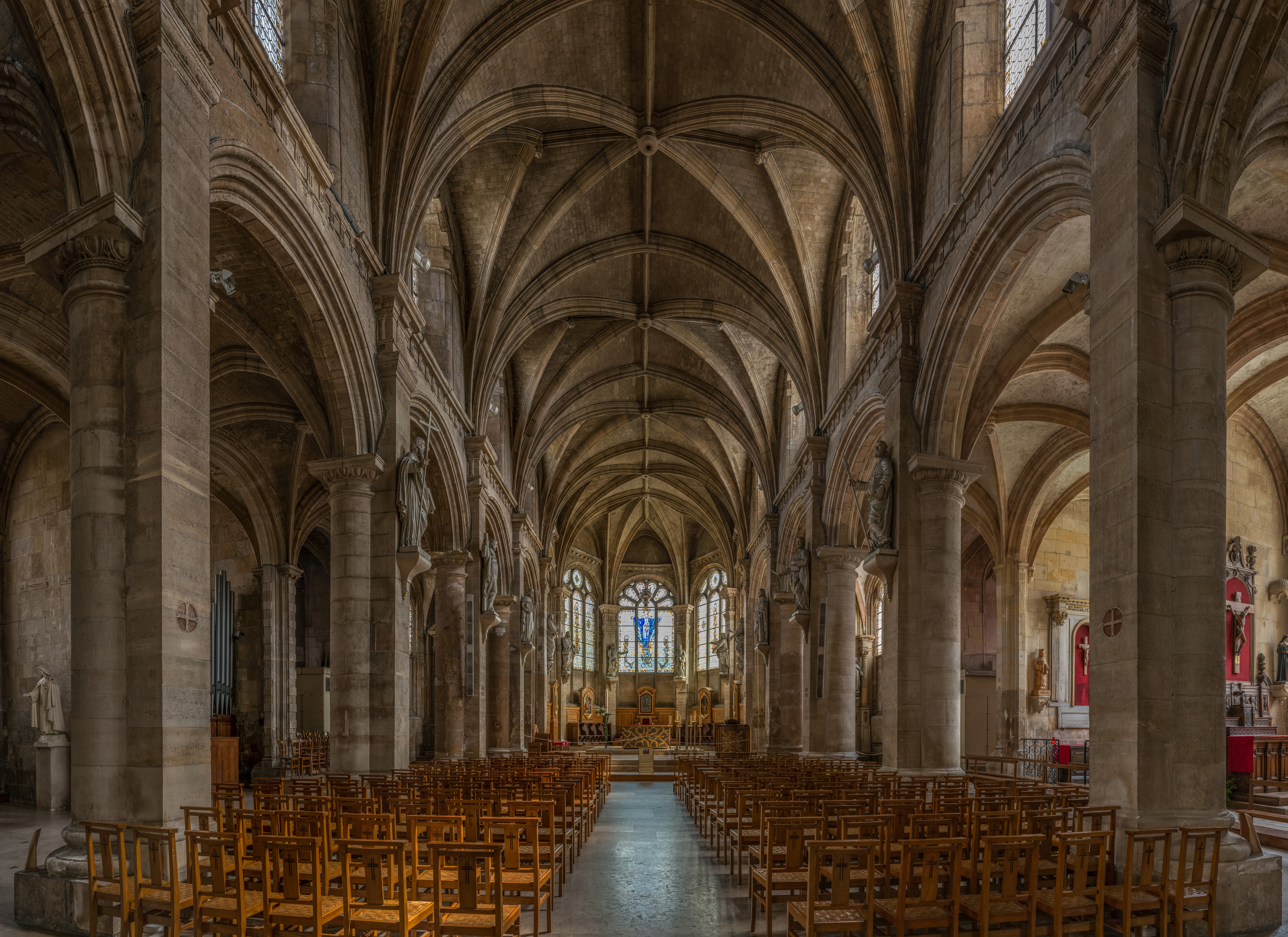
Le Havre Cathedral interior

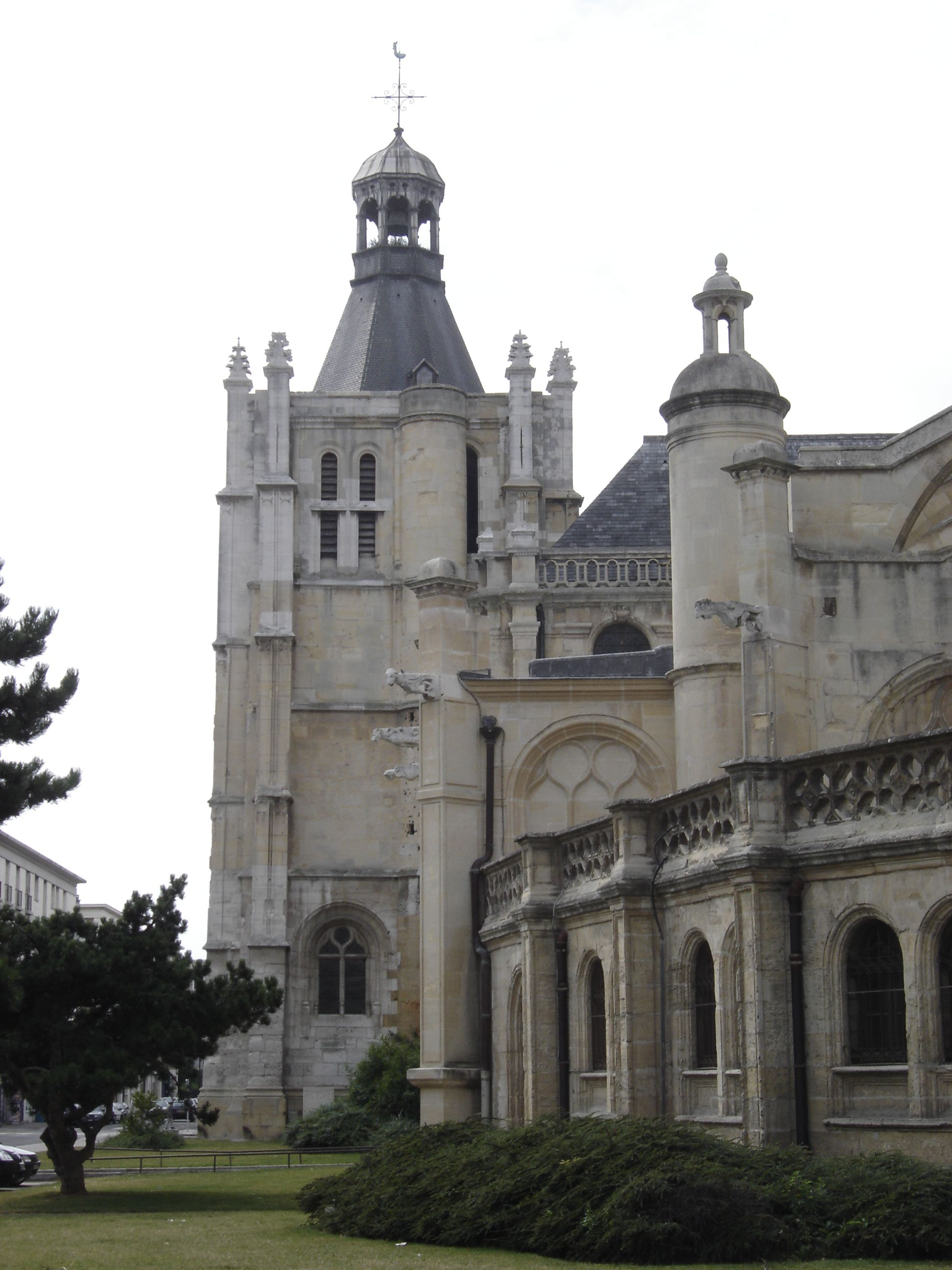
Le Havre Cathedral

== Sources ==
- Catholic Hierarchy: Diocese of Le Havre
