= Ateliers d'Art Sacré =

Collective of Catholic artists

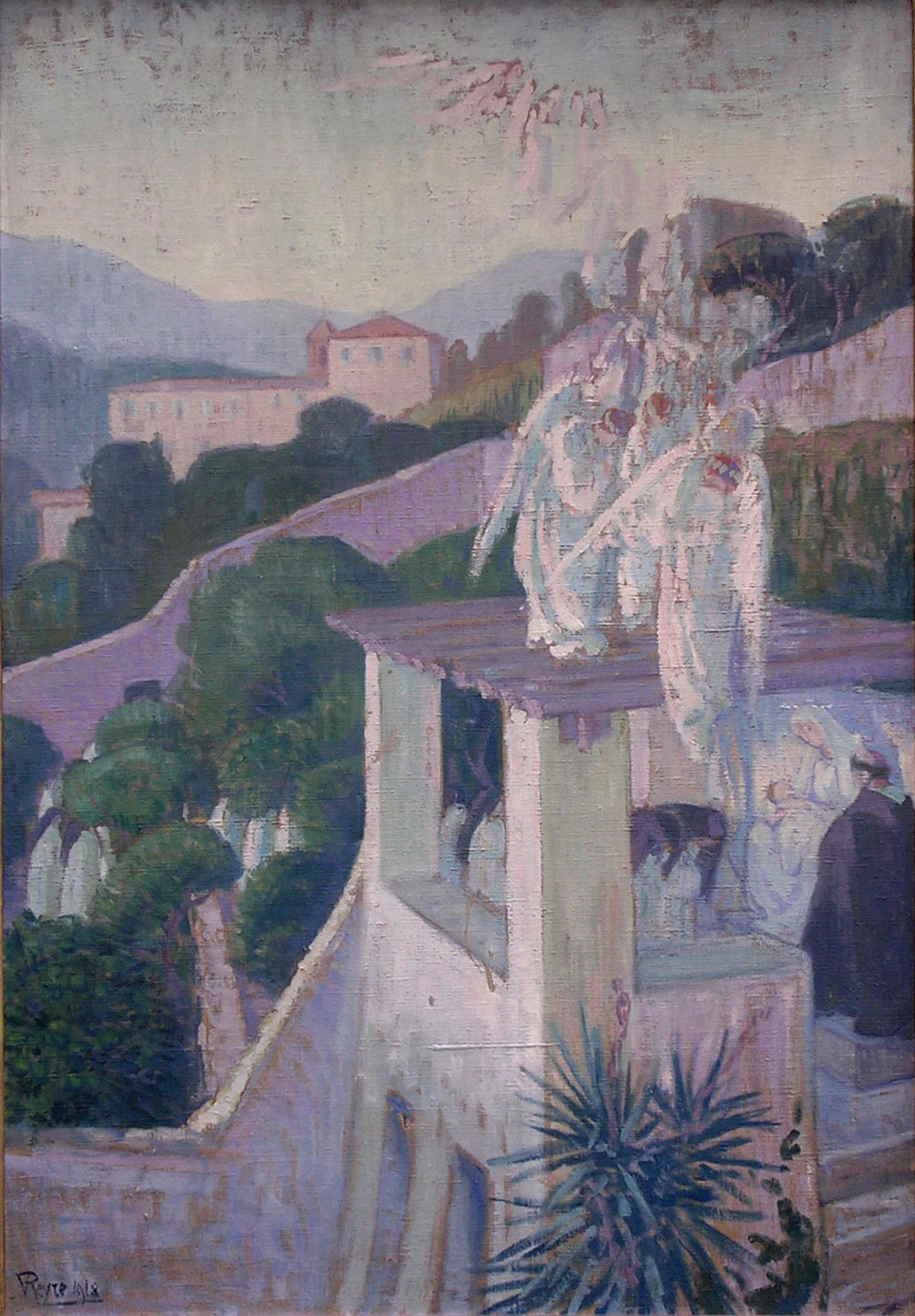
- Valentine Reyre, Nativité aux dominicaines
- Years active: 1919-1947
- Location: France
- Major figures: Maurice Denis, Georges Desvallières

The Ateliers d'Art Sacré (Studios of Sacred Art, 1919-1947) was a collective of artists based in Paris, France in the first half of the 20th century. It aimed to create religious art that was both modern and accessible to the general public. For nearly thirty years, this movement brought together a large number of artists dedicated to producing art in the service of the Catholic faith.

== Foundation ==
The Ateliers d'Art Sacré were founded on 15 November 1919 after World War I (1914-18) by Maurice Denis (1870–1943) and Georges Desvallières (1861–1950) as part of a broad movement in Europe to reconcile the church with modern civilization.

Their aim was to train artists and crafts people in the practice of Christian art and to provide tasteful religious works of traditional and modern style to churches, particularly those that had been devastated by the war. Denis stated that he was against academic art because it sacrificed emotion to convention and artifice, and was also against realism because it was prose, whereas what was needed was music. Above all, he aspired to beauty, which was an attribute of divinity.

A group of 22 shareholders were organized into the Société des Ateliers d’Art Sacré, which oversaw the material side of the project. The school first moved into various addresses on the Left Bank of Paris (the former studio of Paul Sérusier, 7 rue Joseph-Bara, and later moving to no. 8 rue de Furstemberg). Other workshops were then associated with it: that of the stained glass artist Marguerite Huré or the sculpture workshop, housed in rue Notre-Dame-des-Champs, where Simone Callède, Albert Dubos and Roger de Villiers worked.

The financing of the Workshops depended on receiving orders for religious artwork and the quarterly tuition payments of the students.

== Activities ==
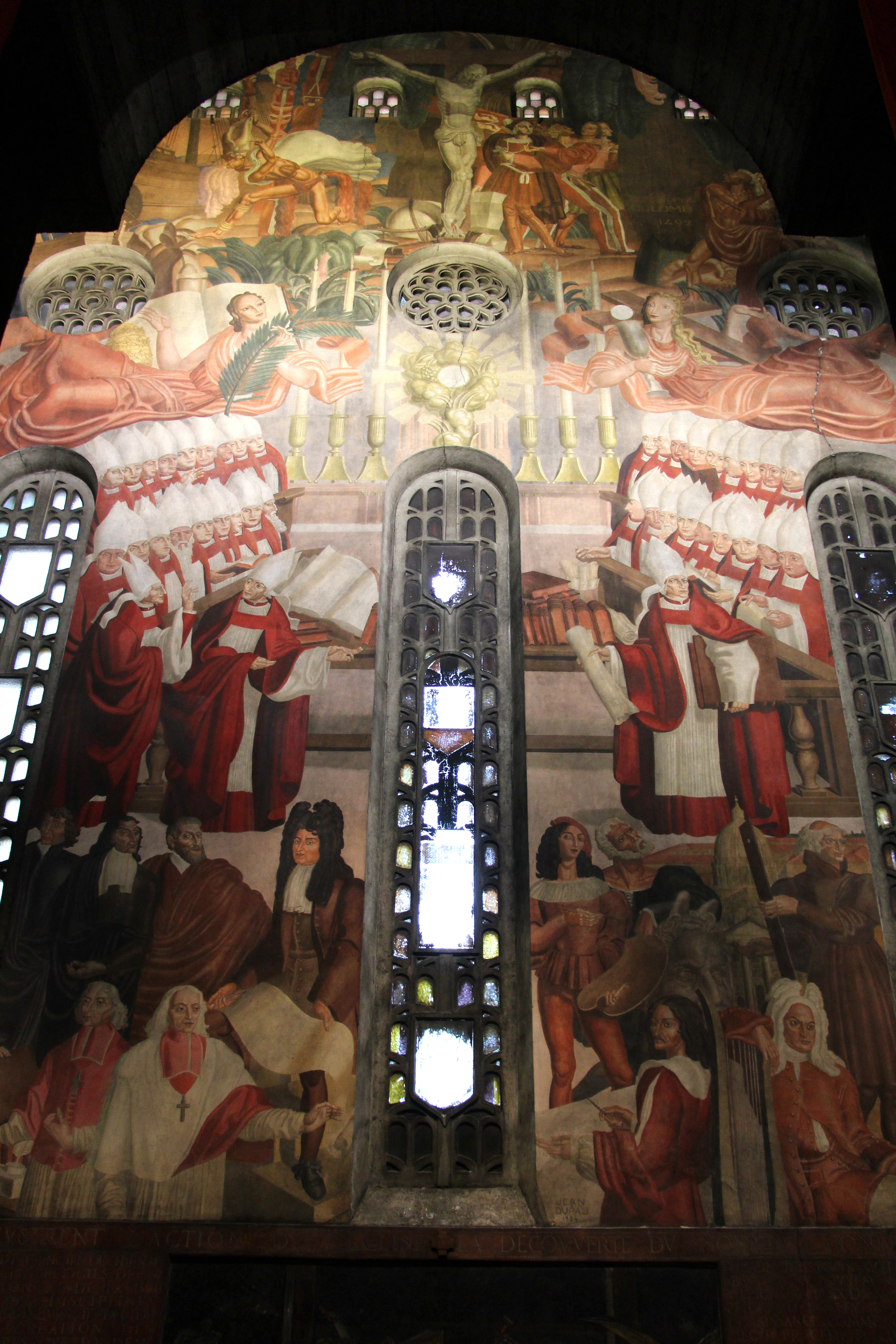
The Council of Trent, a fresco in the Église Saint Esprit (12th arrondissement of Paris) executed by members of the Ateliers

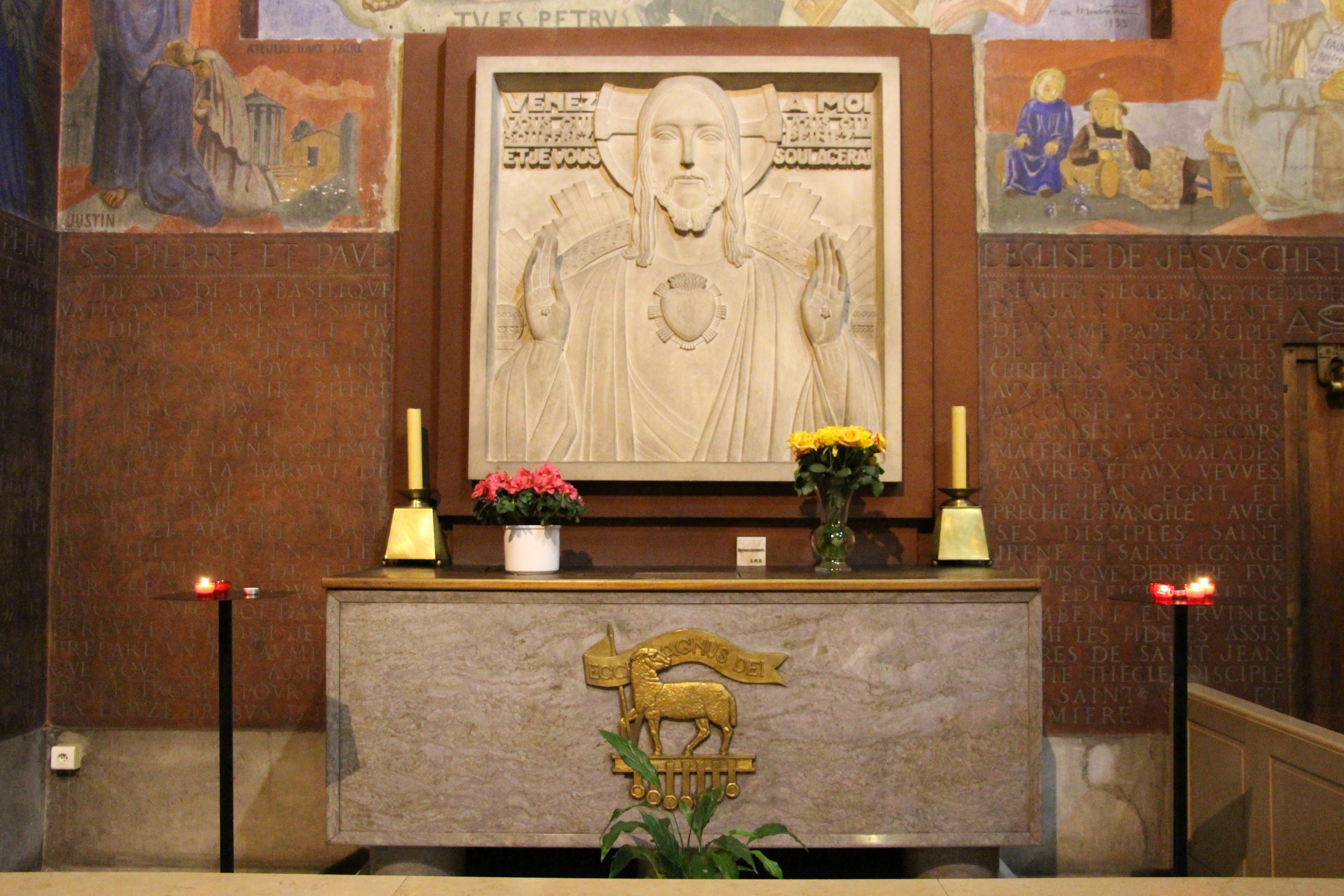
One of the altars in the Saint Esprit Church (twelfth arrondissement of Paris)

The artists of the Ateliers received a number of important orders during the twenties and thirties. They were deeply involved in decoration of the Église Saint-Esprit in Paris, where the iconography shows the milestones in church history. Built over the 1928-35 period by the architect Paul Tournon, the church’s murals were painted by forty artists including Maurice Denis, Georges Desvallières, Henri Marret, Jean Dupa, Pauline Peugniez and Robert Poughéon.

In The Way of the Cross of Saint-Michel de Picpus, decorated in 1934 under the direction of Henri de Maistre, the personality of the artists was effaced for the sake of the collaborative work.

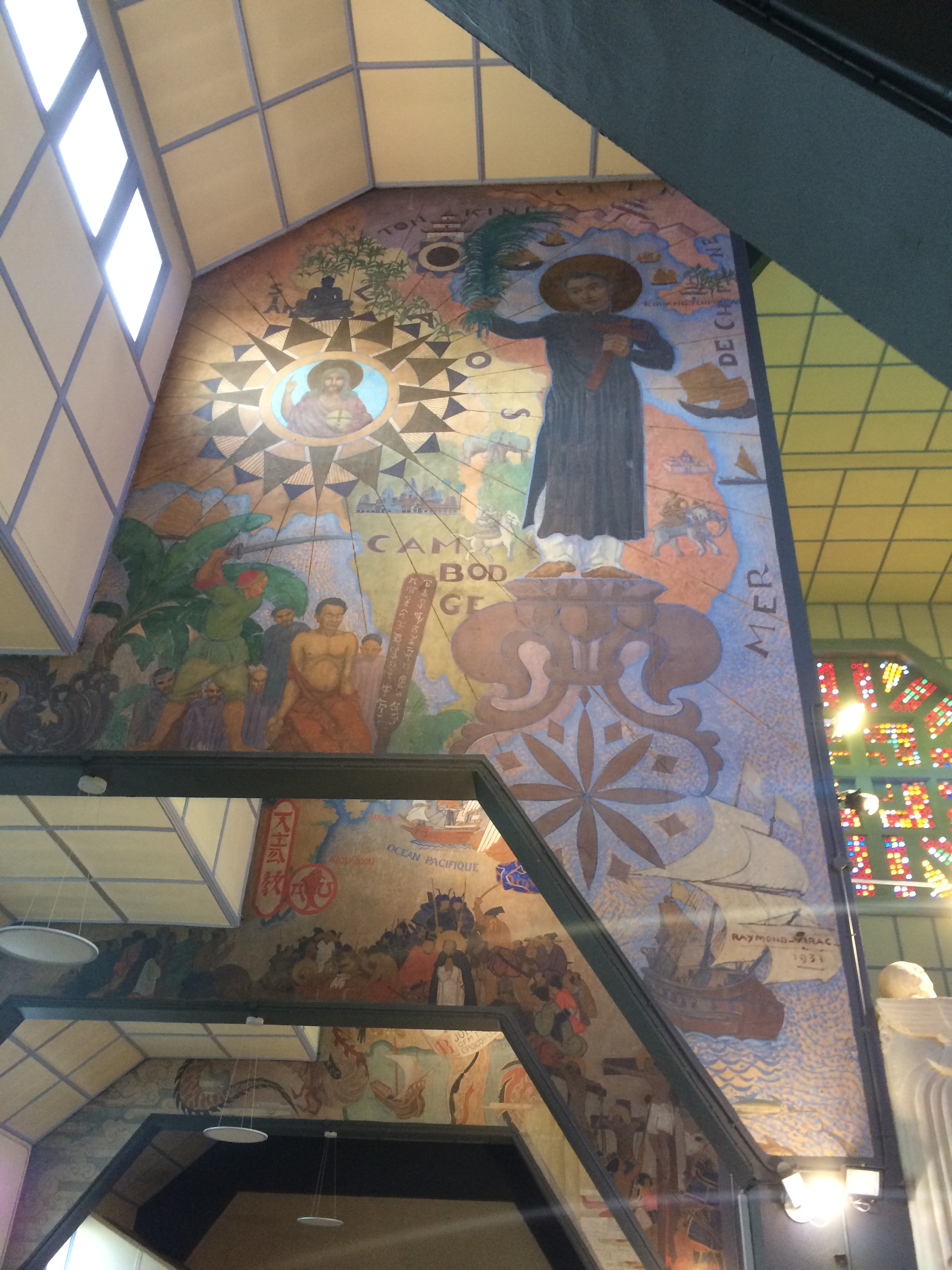
Fresco by Raymond Virac in the church of Notre-Dame-des-Missions in Épinay-sur-Seine. The fresco depicts missionary work in Vietnam.

The church of the ‘French Village’ of the Decorative Arts Fair of 1925 also brought together masters and companions from the Ateliers in the church of the French Village.

The Ateliers also did the Church of the Catholic Missions Pavilion at the International Colonial Exhibition of 1931. This church is now Notre-Dame-des-Missions in Épinay-sur-Seine.

== Education of artists ==
Education of young artists was a central part of the mission of the Ateliers. Denis and Desvallières opposed the academic teaching of the Beaux Arts tradition as well as such avant-garde movements as cubism or futurism which, in their eyes, endangered the durability of art even in West.

For Denis, artistic education should ideally be based on the collaboration of students and their teachers: "Instead of an academy, it would be a workshop, or a group of workshops where we accept orders, where we would execute not for vague exhibitions, but for precise destinations, all that serves to adorn the cult, in such a way that the pupil becomes what he was before the Renaissance... an apprentice, then an assistant to the master". In Denis’ view, modern artistic education should strive to develop sensitivity, free the imagination of students, train them in craftsmanship, while also cultivating their reason and their taste. Theological education and spiritual formation were also part of the Atelier’s program.

The broader objective of the Ateliers was that its students would ultimately form a community of trained and fraternal Christian artists, working in the spirit of the corporations of the Middle Ages.

== Members ==
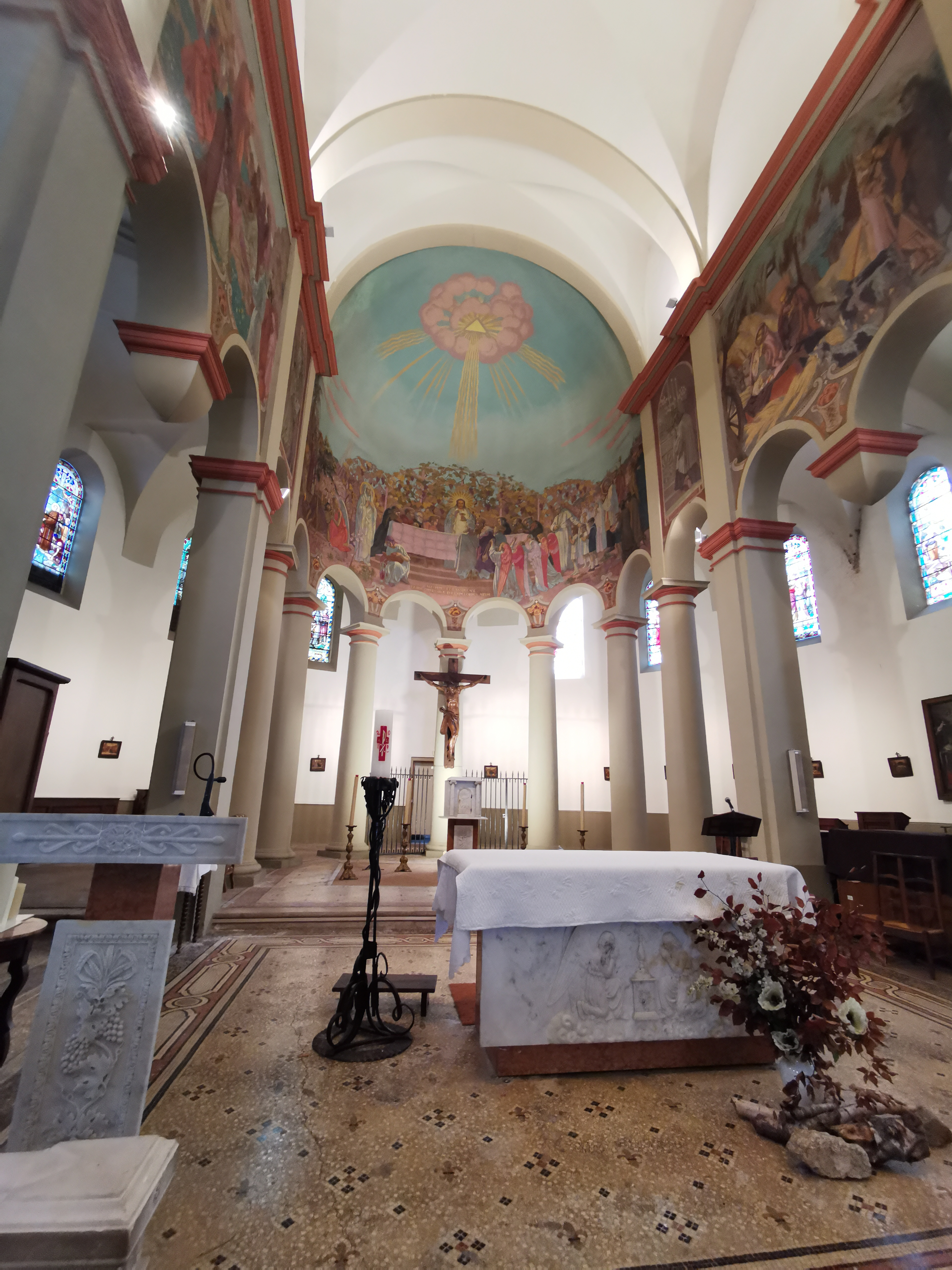
Church of Saint Martin, in Vienne, France, with frescoes by Maurice Denis

By founding the Sacred Art Workshops in 1919 with George Desvallières, Maurice Denis trained a whole generation of young painters. His official recognition reached its peak after the end of the First World War, when several retrospective exhibitions were dedicated to him (Biennale of Venice in 1922, Pavillon de Marsan in Paris in 1924). He became a member of the Académie de Beaux Arts in 1932.

George Desvallières became interested in religious art after losing a son to World War I in 1915; he himself had commanded a battalion in the Vosges during the war. He tackled a number of public and private decorative programs related to the war; among these were stained glass windows for the Douaumont ossuary. Works by Desvallières may be found in the Musée d'Orsay and the Musée du Louvre.

The Dominican Marie-Alain Couturier (1897–1954) was a member of the Ateliers. He argued that a masterpiece, even if made by a non-believer, would always be more effective than a religious work of lesser value. He gradually moved away from the influence of Maurice Denis and developed an admiration for Pablo Picasso and Henri Matisse.

The Canadian painter Jean Dallaire (1916–1965) received a grant from the government of Quebec that allowed him to go to Paris and study at Ateliers d'Art Sacré and the studio of André Lhote. He also worked in his own studio in Montmartre. While in Paris, Dallaire discovered the work of Pablo Picasso and the surrealists, such as Salvador Dali.

The master stained glass artist, Marguerite Huré (1896-1967), applied the principles of the Ateliers to the stained glass in the modernist St. Joseph's Church, Le Havre.

== Closure ==
Over the longer term, revenues from church commissions were not sufficient to sustain the Ateliers, which closed on the decision of their Board at the beginning of the 1947 academic year.

The closure can be attributed to the failure of the Ateliers’ attempt to graft modernity onto sacred art and to the lack of enthusiasm of the public. In addition, the clergy of the time was mostly without artistic training and not very competent in aesthetics. This new art also often met with hostile reactions from reactionary circles’ who considered it "degenerate". But more often than not, indifference prevailed.

Another cause of this failure was the outbreak of the Second World War and the shortages it caused. In October 1939, Henri de Maistre proposed precautionary measures to Maurice Denis: "The Ateliers could remain open as long as the receipts balance the expenses, that is to say as long as the number of pupils was sufficient to allow each to pay a reasonable sum".

Finally, the architecture style of the time tended to provide more space for large windows and for stained glass; the fresco, a discipline widely practiced by the Ateliers, gradually lost access to the space needed for the Ateliers to survive.

== Place in art history ==
Still relatively little known, the Ateliers d’Art Sacré embodied the idealism of its members and their collective mode of work. The Ateliers strove to combine modernity with the corporatist tradition of the religious art of the Middle Ages in an exclusively spiritual project.

Also noteworthy are the large number of women among the Companions and student's and the fact that this trend will have lasted for about thirty years despite the difficulties encountered.

During this same period, other institutions also attempted this renewal of the sacred arts: the Catholics of the fine arts (founded in 1909), the Society of Saint-Jean, L'Arche (founded in 1917 by Valentine Reyre and Maurice Storez), the Artisans de l'Autel (founded in 1919), and again Art et Louange, as well as the Ateliers de Nazareth (founded in 1928).

== Gallery ==
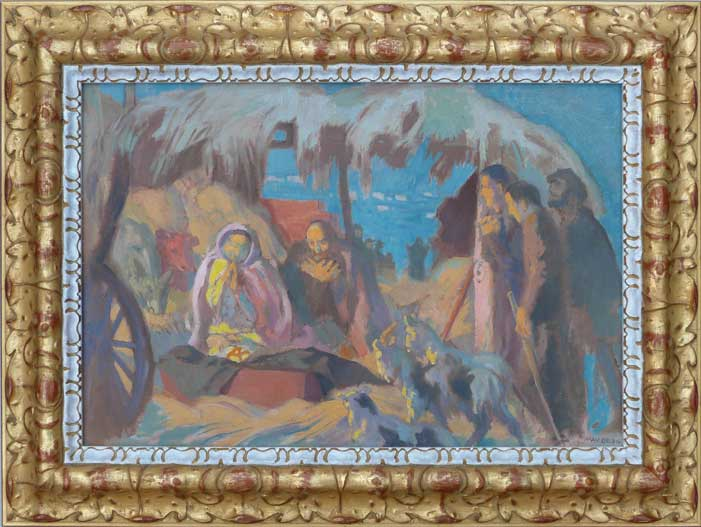
Adoration of the shepherds by Maurice Denis

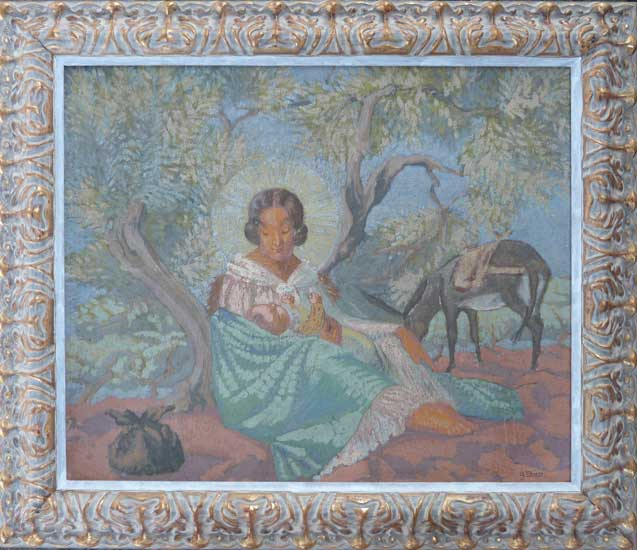
Rest in Egypt by Gabrielle Faure

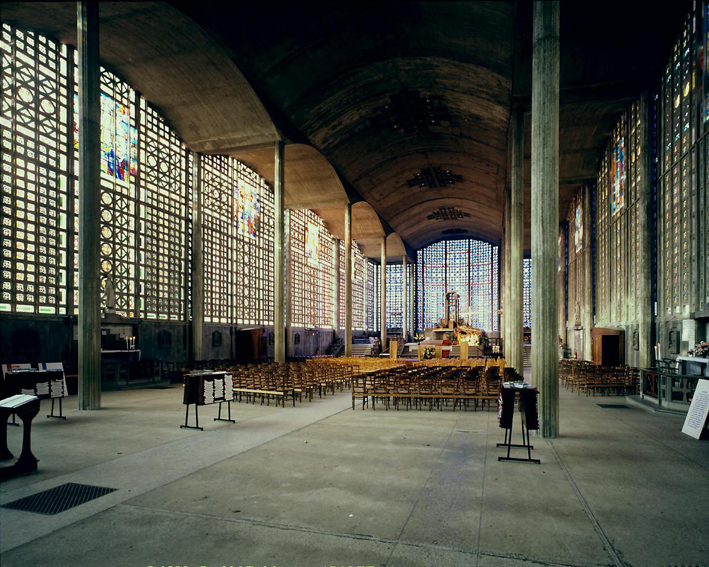
Interior of Notre Dame de Raincy, with windows by Marguerite Huré

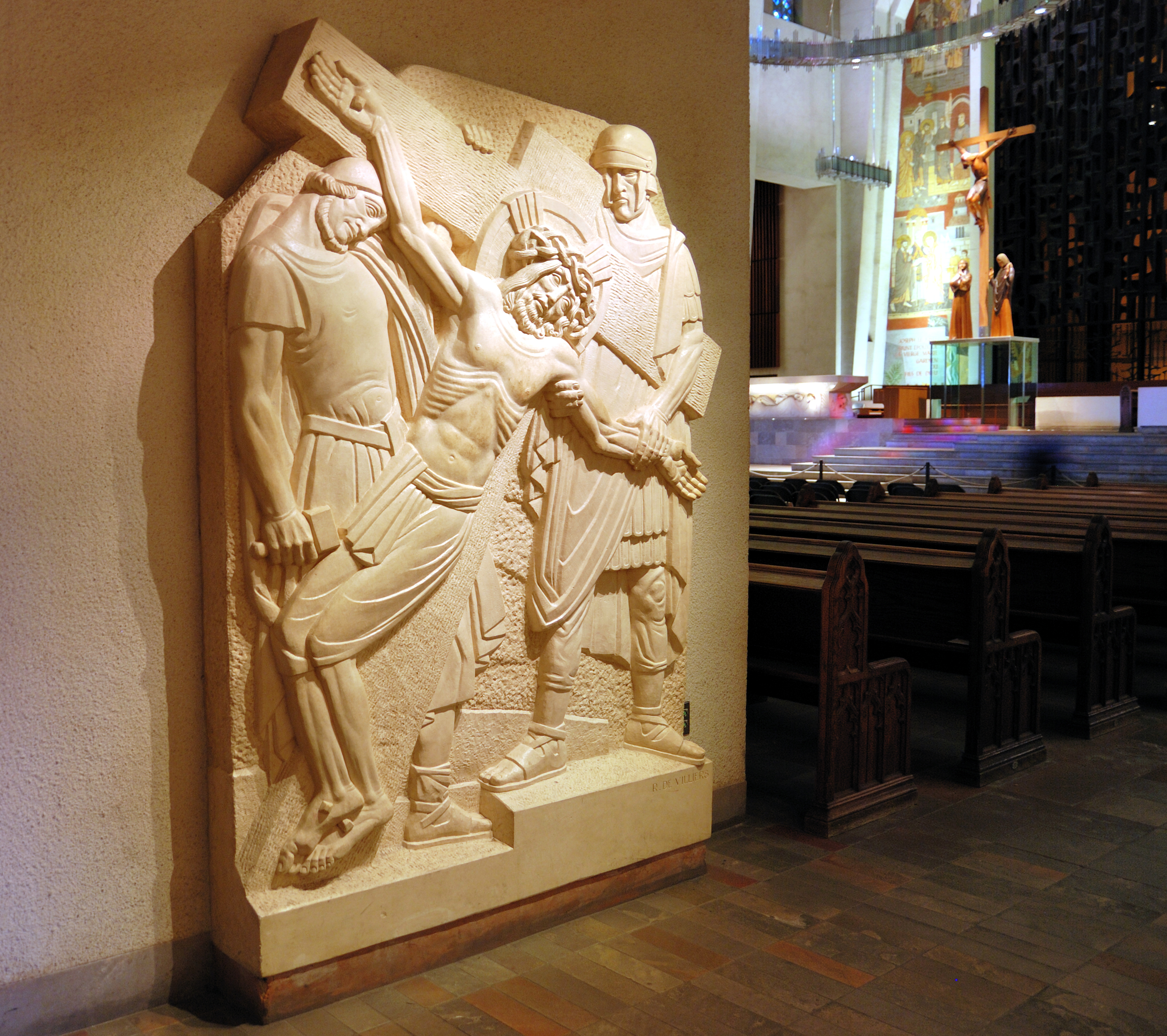
Roger de Villiers’ station of the cross at the Saint Joseph’s Oratory in Montreal, Canada
