= Saint-Esprit, Paris =

Catholic church in eastern Paris

Church of the Holy Spirit
- Église du Saint-Esprit
- Exterior on Rue Cannebière

- Location within Paris
- 48.838100°N 2.397600°E
- Location: 186, Avenue Daumesnil, 12th arrondissement, Paris
- Country: France
- Denomination: Catholic
- Website: www.st-esprit.org

History
- Status: Active
- Dedication: 1935

Architecture
- Architect: Paul Tournon
- Architectural type: Church
- Groundbreaking: 1928
- Completed: 1935

Administration
- Archdiocese: Paris
- Parish: Saint-Esprit

Saint-Esprit (French pronunciation: [sɛ̃t‿ɛspʁi]) is a Catholic church in the 12th arrondissement of Paris, France, in the southeast of the city.

== History ==
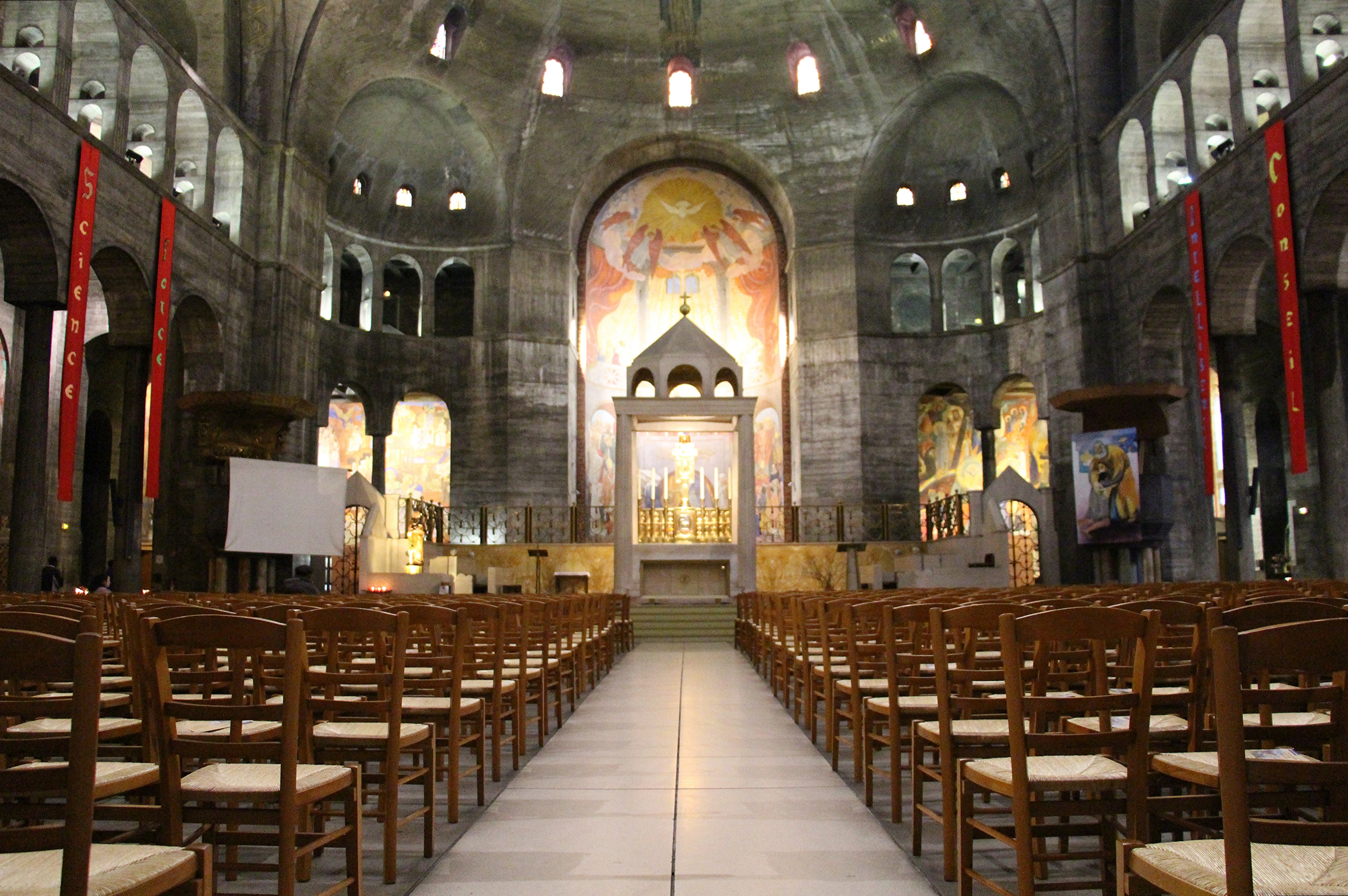
The nave of the church, with its altar and ciborium.

The population of the 12th arrondissement had been growing since 1860, creating a need for a large church. The triangular parcel of land the church now occupies between avenue Daumesnil and rue Claude Decaen was purchased in 1927 by the Archbishop, Cardinal Dubois, and his auxiliary Mgr Crépin.

The Église du Saint-Esprit was built between 1928 and 1935. The crypt was inaugurated in 1929 and served as a chapel while the upper part of the church was being built. The work progressed slowly due to lack of funding. When Cardinal Dubois died in 1929, he was replaced by Bishop Verdier, who resumed construction in 1932. His bust is above the main door.

The interior decor of the church was protected as a monument historique by the Ministry of Culture on 17 August 1979. The entire edifice was designated a historical monument in 1992.

== Architecture ==
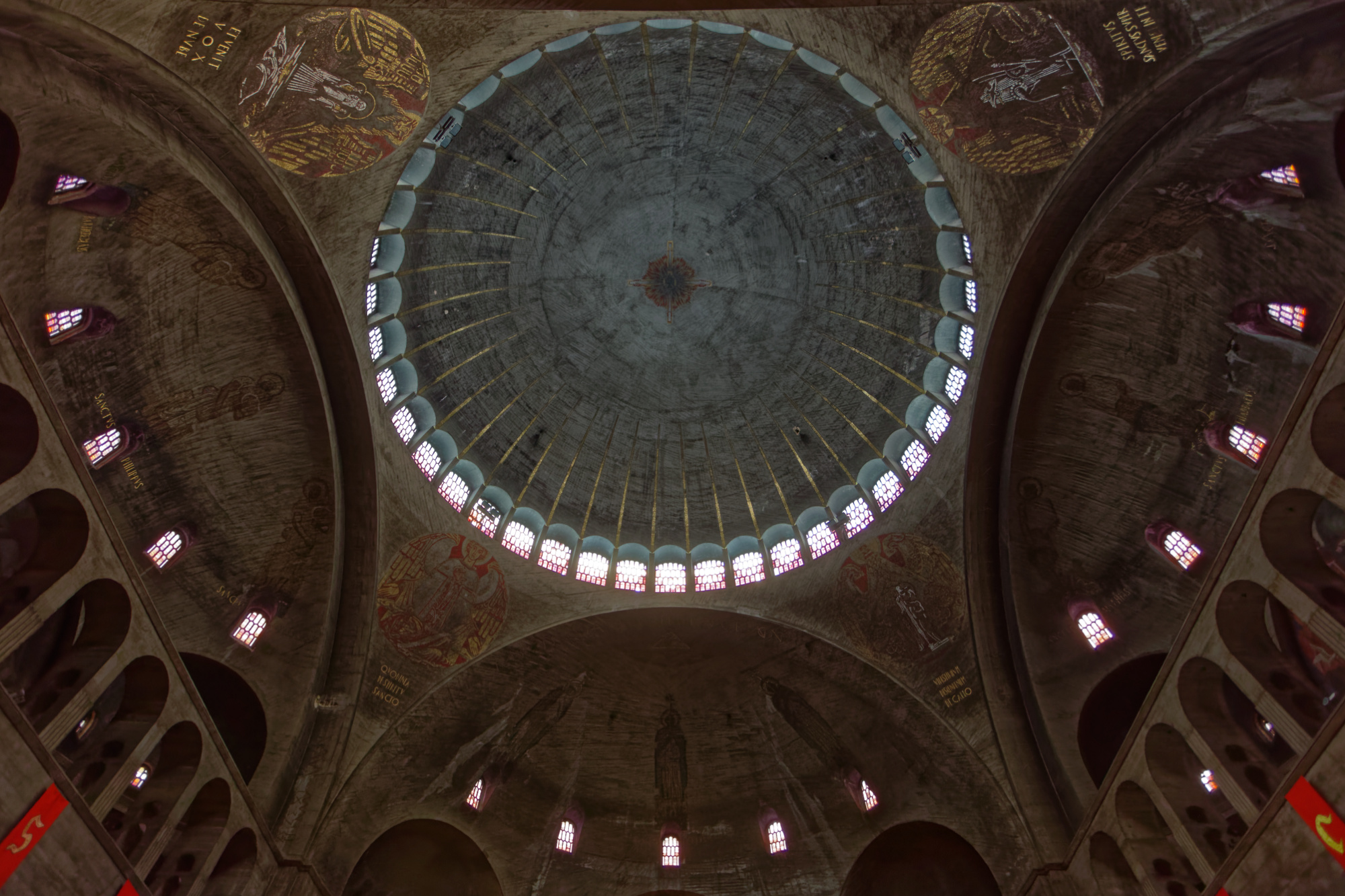
The dome

The architecture of the church—with its juxtaposition of Byzantine influence and reinforced concrete—is 'absolutely unique.'

The architect, Paul Tournon, designed and built the church, following a plan inspired by that of the Hagia Sophia in Istanbul.

The church has a huge dome — 22 metres (72 ft) in diameter with a summit at 33 metres (108 ft) above ground level. The use of reinforced concrete for the vertical supports and the dome was a major technical feat at the time of construction.

The dome was designed to allow light to enter through the row of openings at its base. Nevertheless, some experts contend that the darkness of the interior interferes with the appreciation of the rich interior décor.

The reinforced concrete of the exterior has a facing of red bricks from Burgundy.

== Interior ==
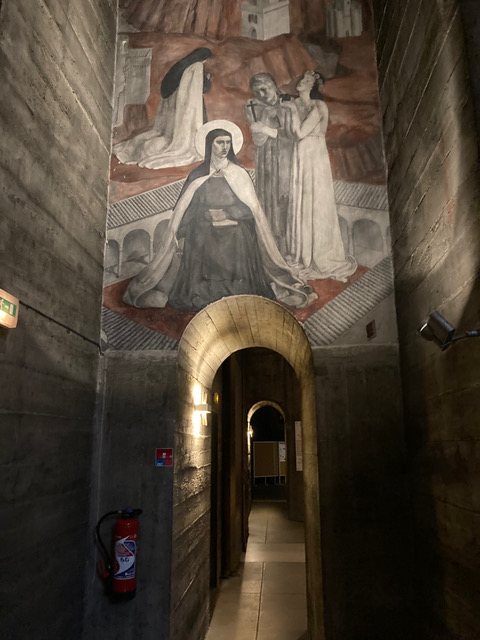
Fresco over doorway

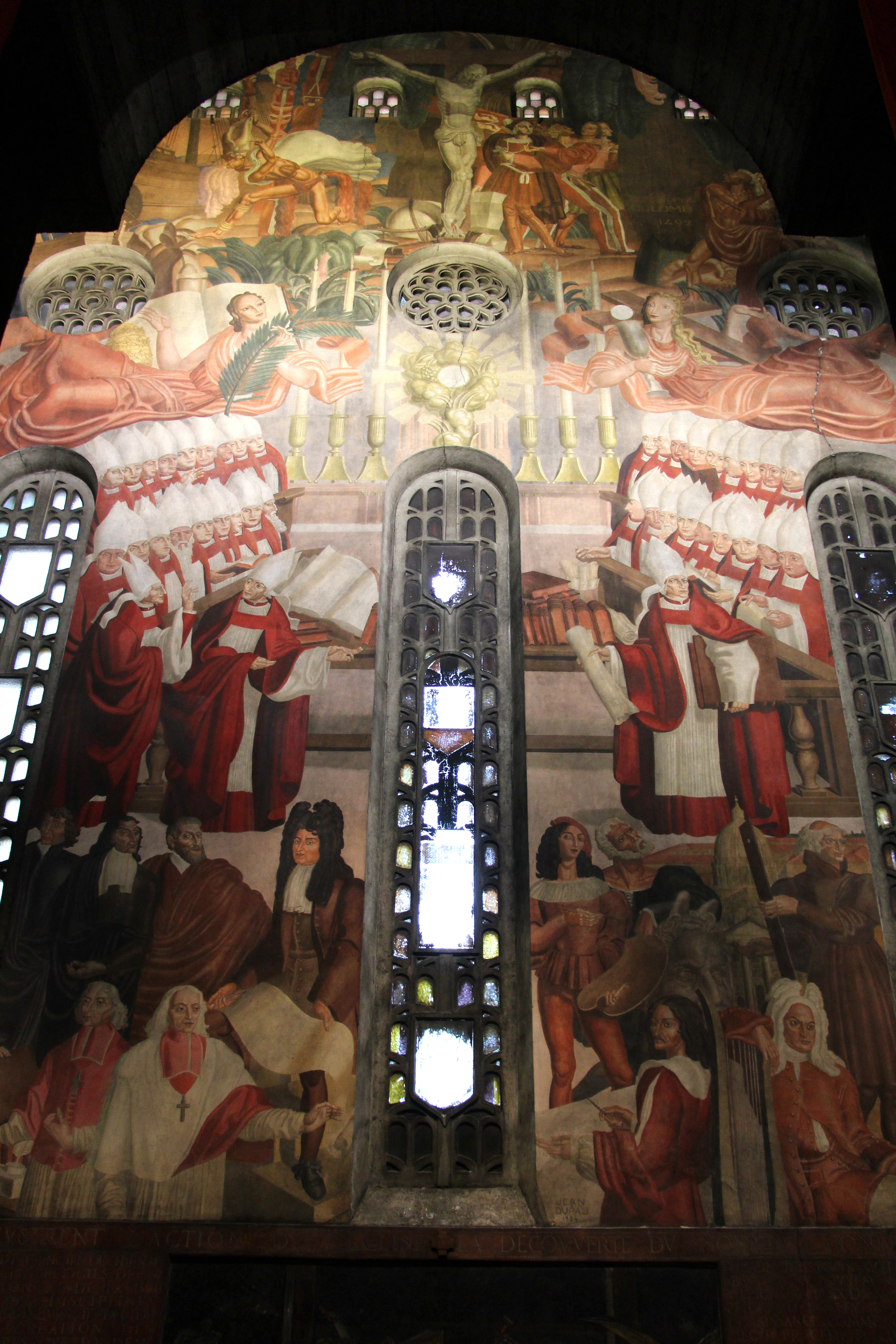
Fresco depicting Christopher Columbus and the Council of Trent, executed by members of the Ateliers d’Art Sacré

The interior was elaborately decorated (frescoes, mosaics, sculptures and stained glass windows) by the artists of the Ateliers d'Art Sacré, an association of Catholic artists dedicated to creating art in the service of God.

The interior is generally dark, giving the church its unique atmosphere.

The decoration illustrates the history of the 'church militant' and of the 'church triumphant' from the Pentecost to the 20th century. One of its main themes is the influence of the Holy Spirit on human history.

The frescoes are organised chronologically into 7 periods: 1. the Pentecost, including the intercession of the Virgin Mary and the descent of the Holy Spirit upon the Apostles; 2: the first to the fourth century, including the martyrdom of Saint Peter and Saint Jean's vision of the Apocalypse; 3. the fifth to the eleventh century, including the baptism of Clovis and Pope Gregory I defining the rules for Gregorian chants; 4. the twelfth to the thirteen century, including Bernard of Clairvaux's founding of the Cistercian monasteries and the construction of the first Gothic cathedrals; 5. the fourteenth to the fifteenth century, including Catherine of Siena in front of the papal palace in Avignon and the precursors of the Renaissance; 6. the sixteenth to the eighteenth century, including Henry IV with the Edict of Nantes, marking a step forward for religious tolerance and an end to the French Wars of Religion; 7. the nineteenth and twentieth century, including an image of the Holy Spirit overseeing the work of both the Holy Family and contemporary workers.

Most of the frescoes were painted onto wet cement and mistakes could not be corrected. To enhance the unity of the interior decor, the architect imposed a standard height for the depiction of all major characters, and red as the color of all the backgrounds.

Murals and frescoes were the work inter alia of Maurice Denis, Georges Desvallières, Robert Poughéon, Nicolas Untersteller and Elizabeth Branly.

Carlo Sarrabezolles sculpted the statues and the stained glass windows are the work of Louis Barillet, Paul Louzier and Jean Herbert-Stevens. Raymond Subes undertook the metalwork and Marcel Imbs made the mosaic and stained glass boxes of the crypt.

== Organ ==
The choir organ was built by Gloton-Debierre after plans by Albert Alain, and was inaugurated by Jehan Alain in December 1934. A century after the church's construction, plans were undertaken to transfer the organ from the Saint-Nicaise church in Rouen to Saint-Esprit.

The church's first organist was Jeanne Demessieux who worked there between 1933 and 1962.

== Gallery ==
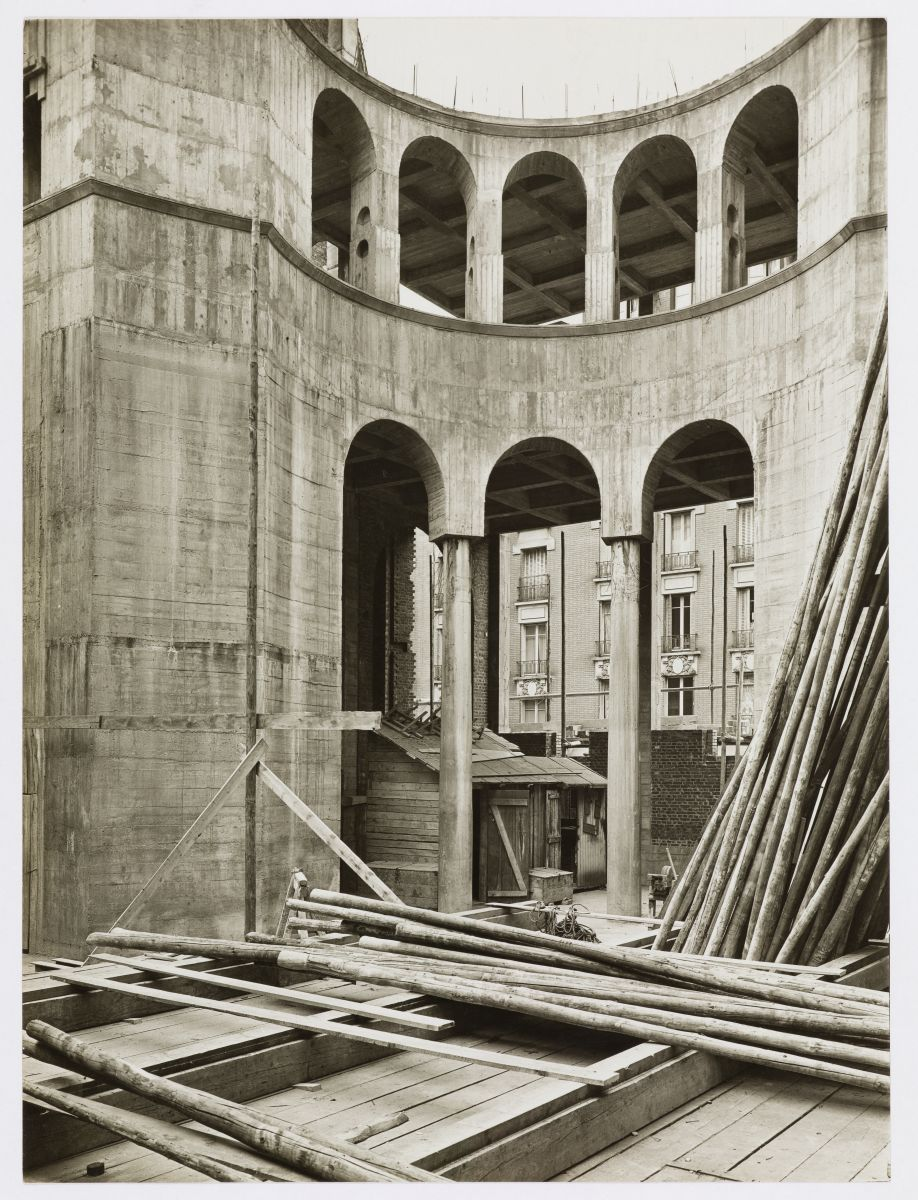
Under construction in 1928

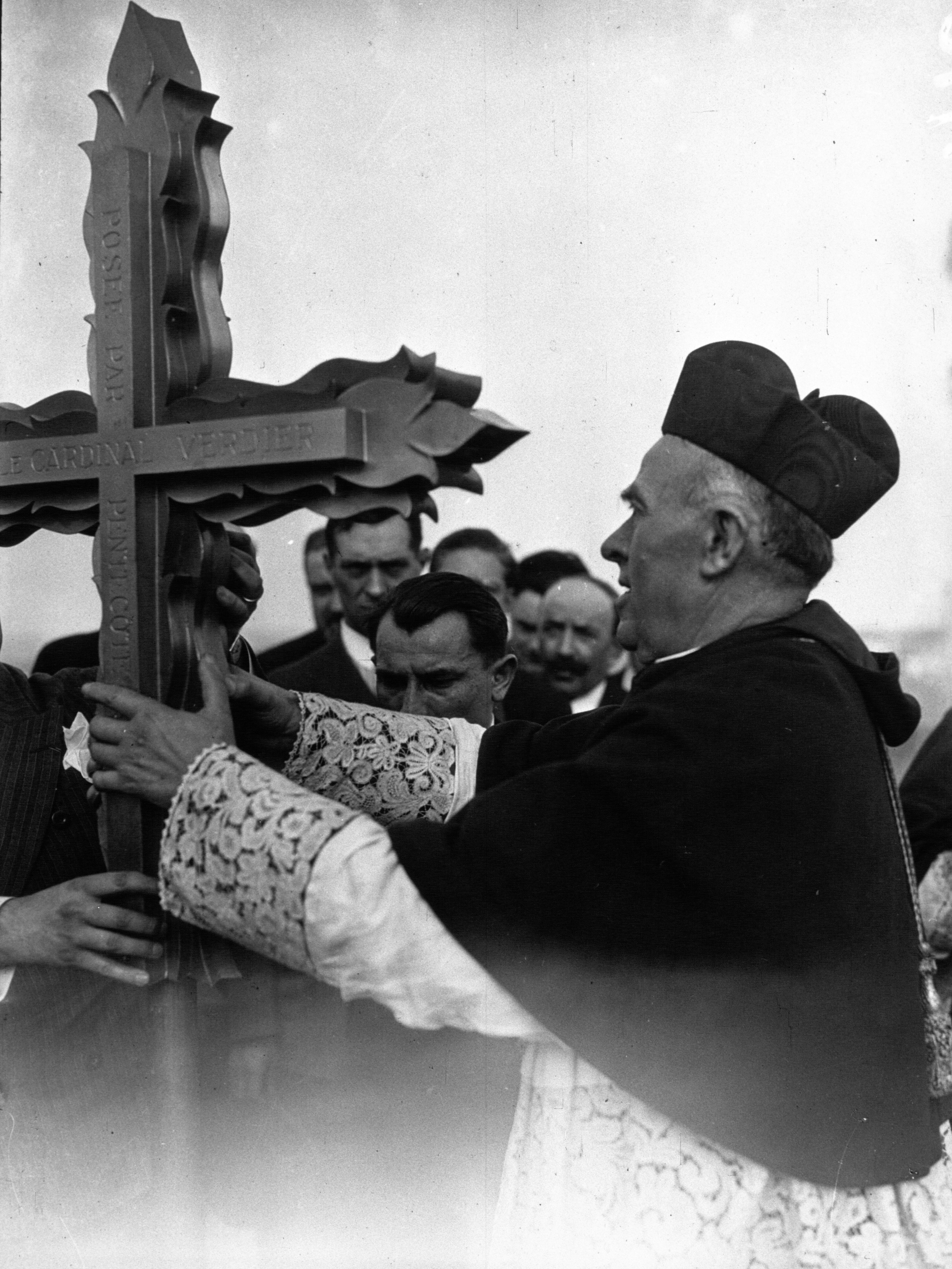
Dedication by Cardinal Jean Verdier in 1935

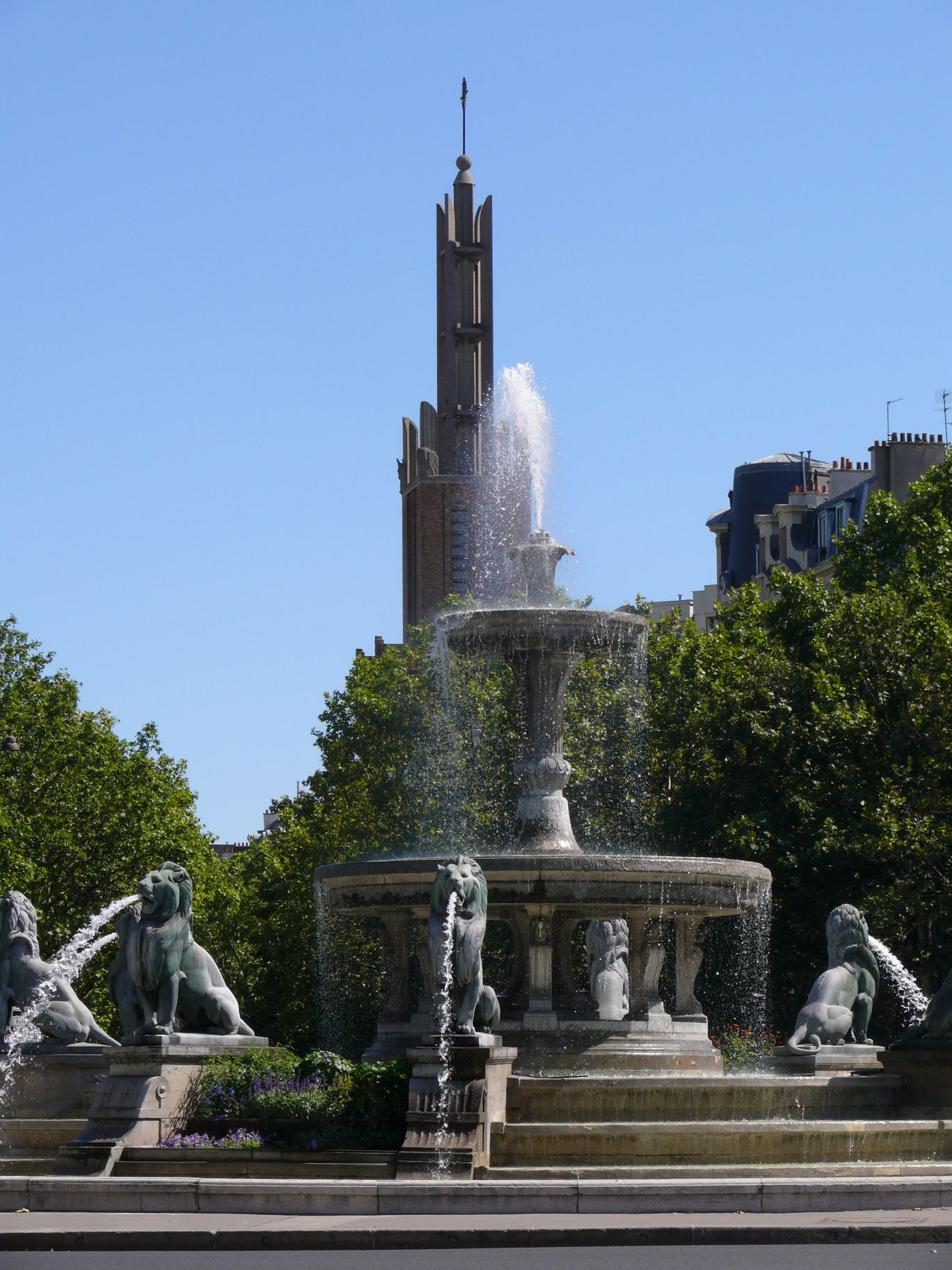
The church spire seen from Place Felix Eboué

The entry way at 186, avenue Daumesnil

The facing of red brick from Burgundy on the facade

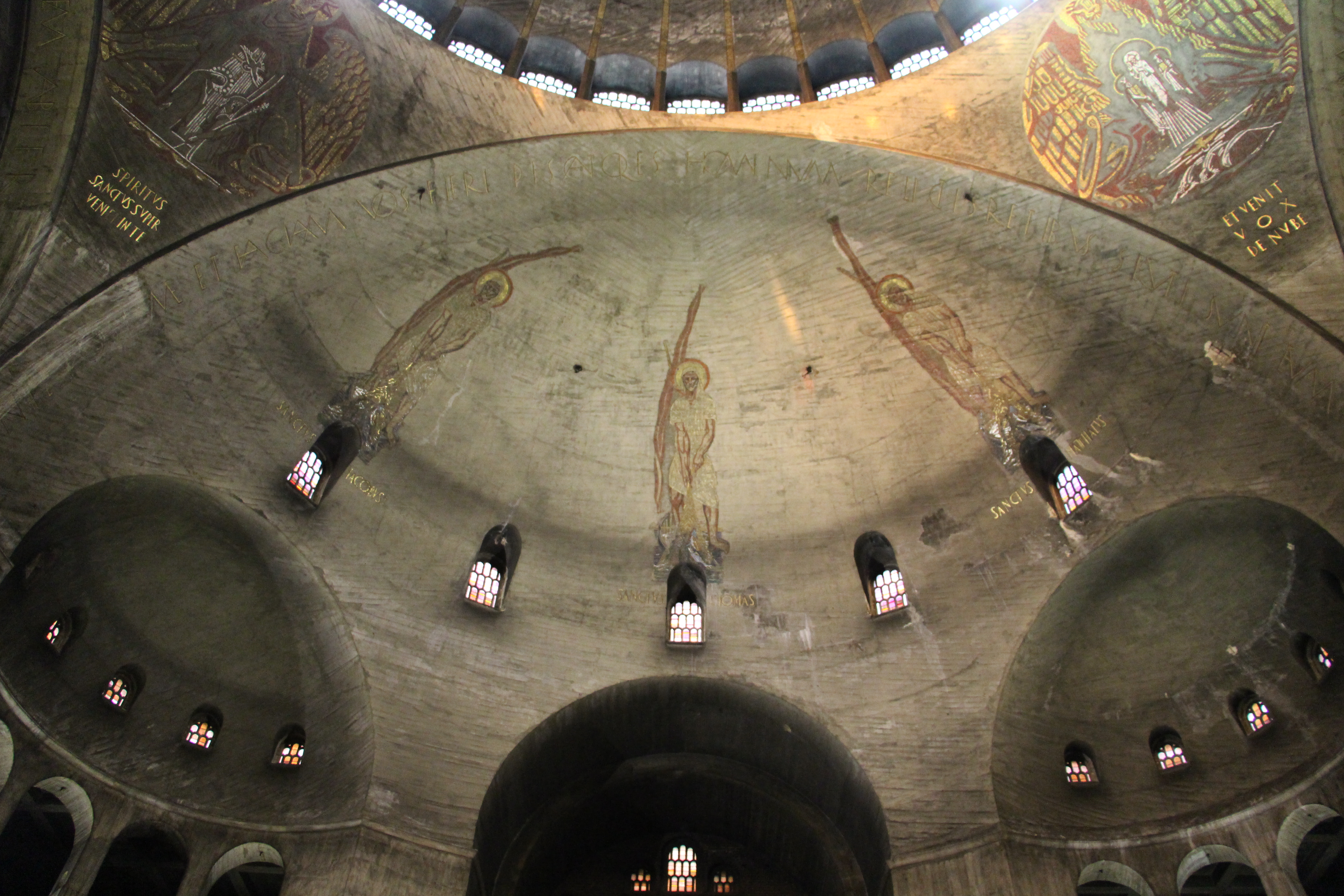
A supporting half dome

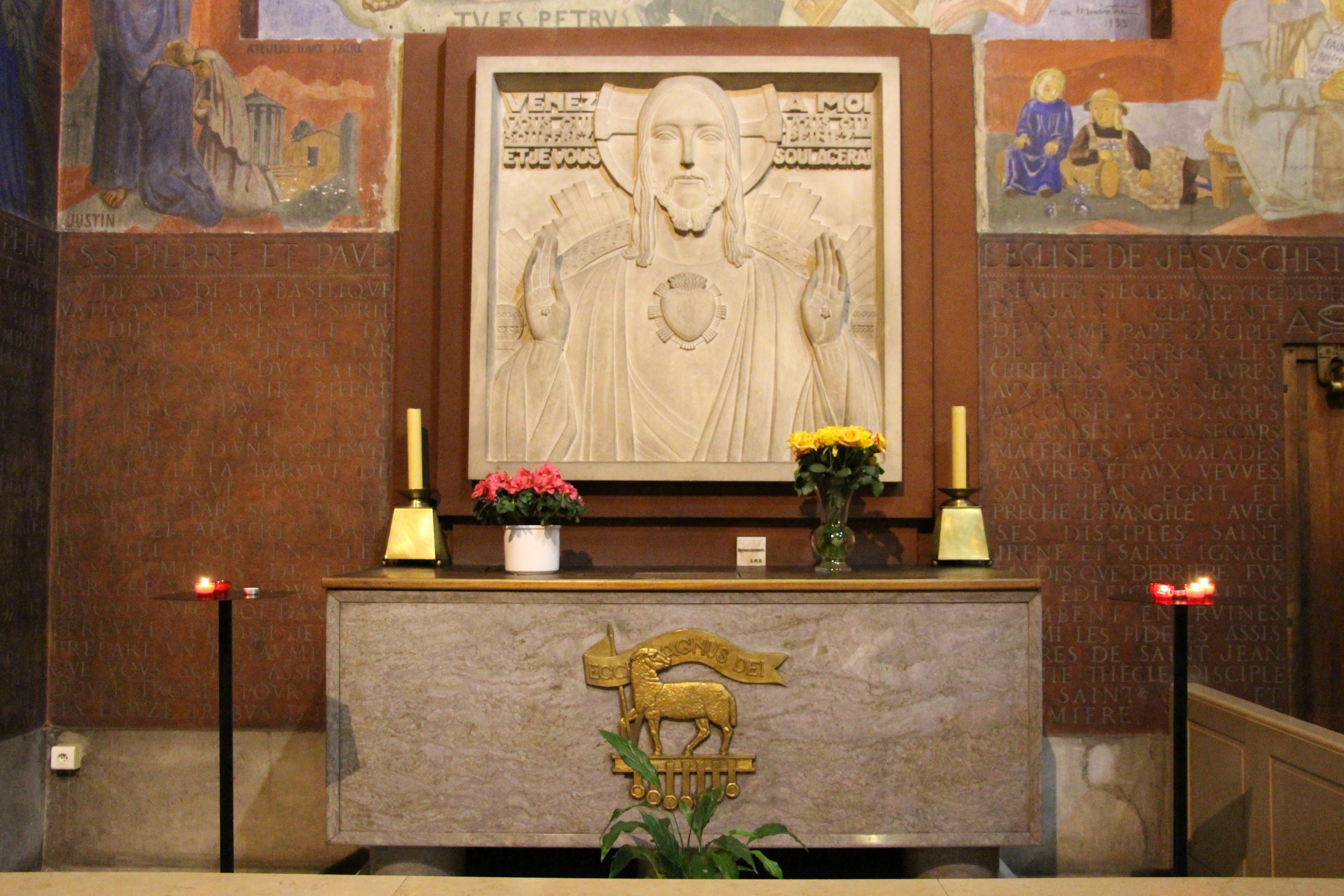
Detail of interior

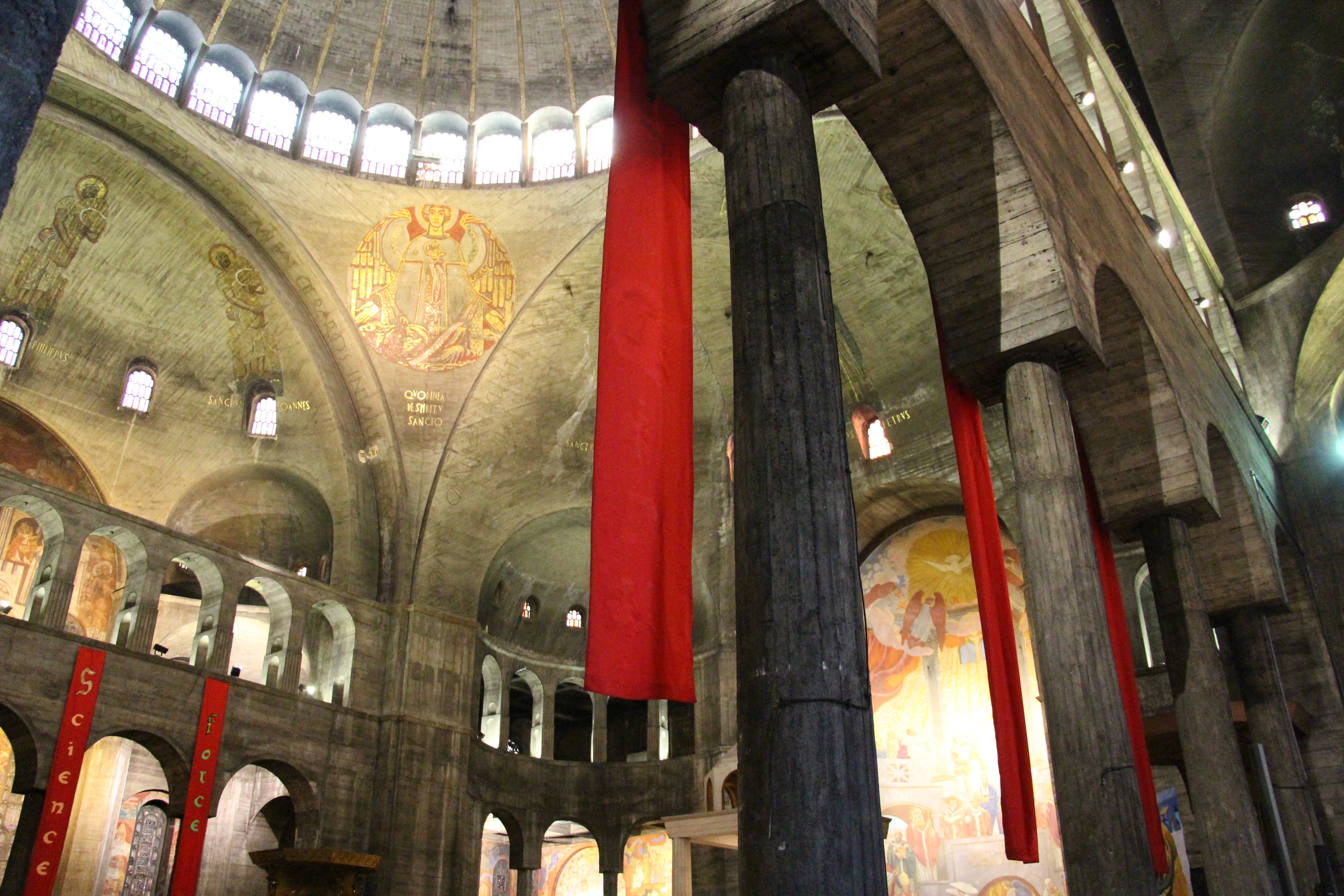
Another view of the interior

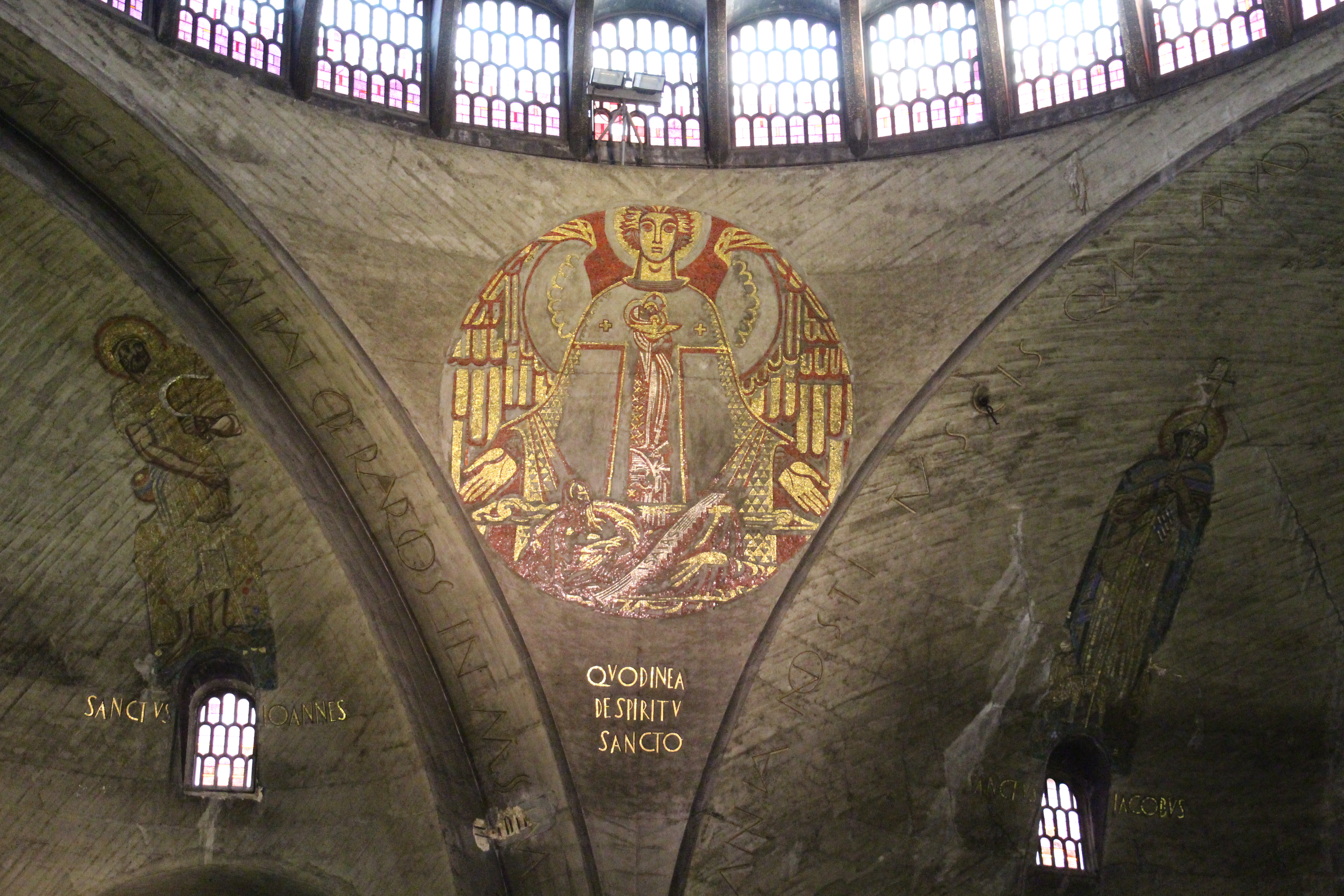
Detail of decoration

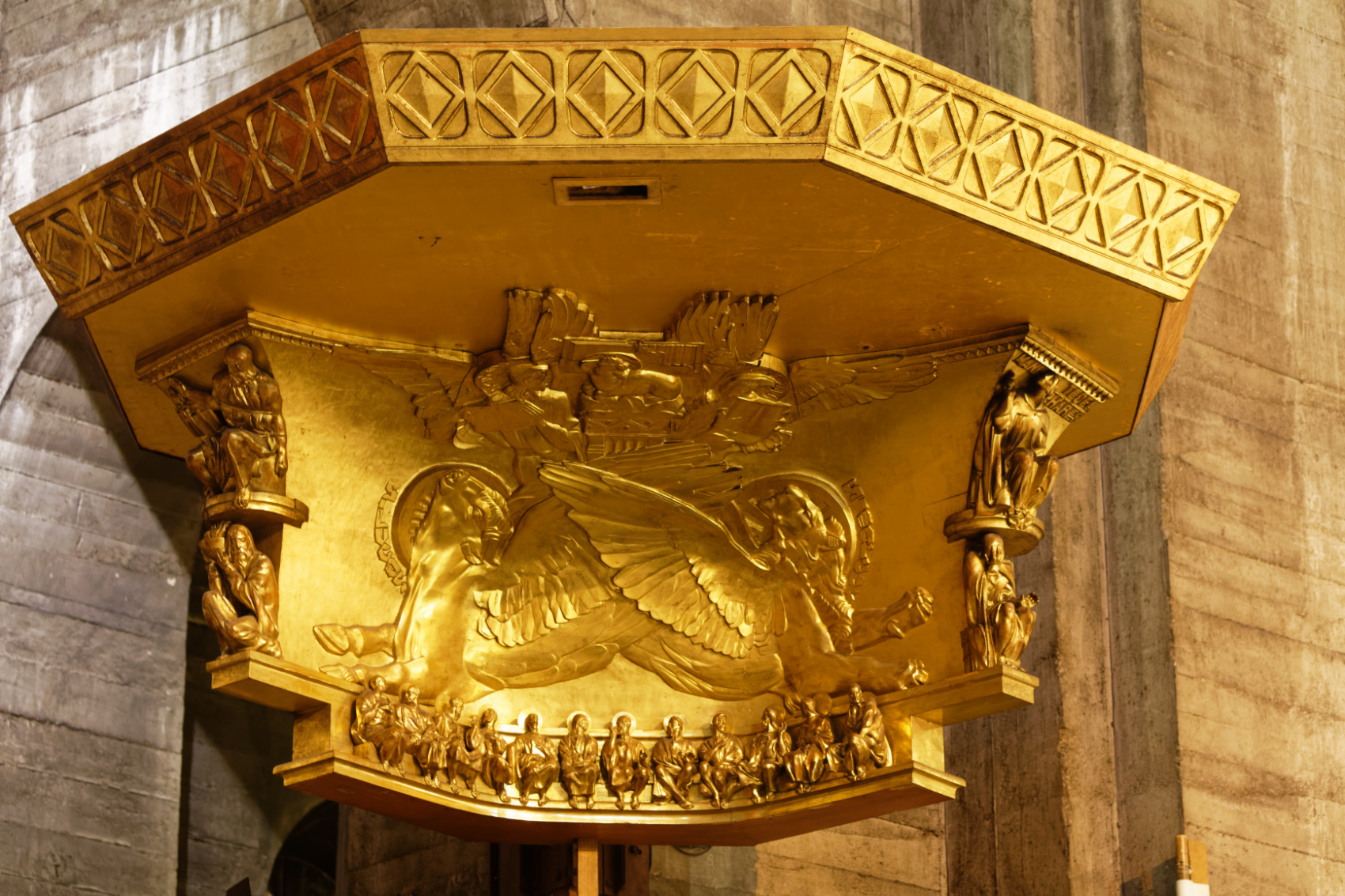
The gilt pulpit against a backdrop of concrete

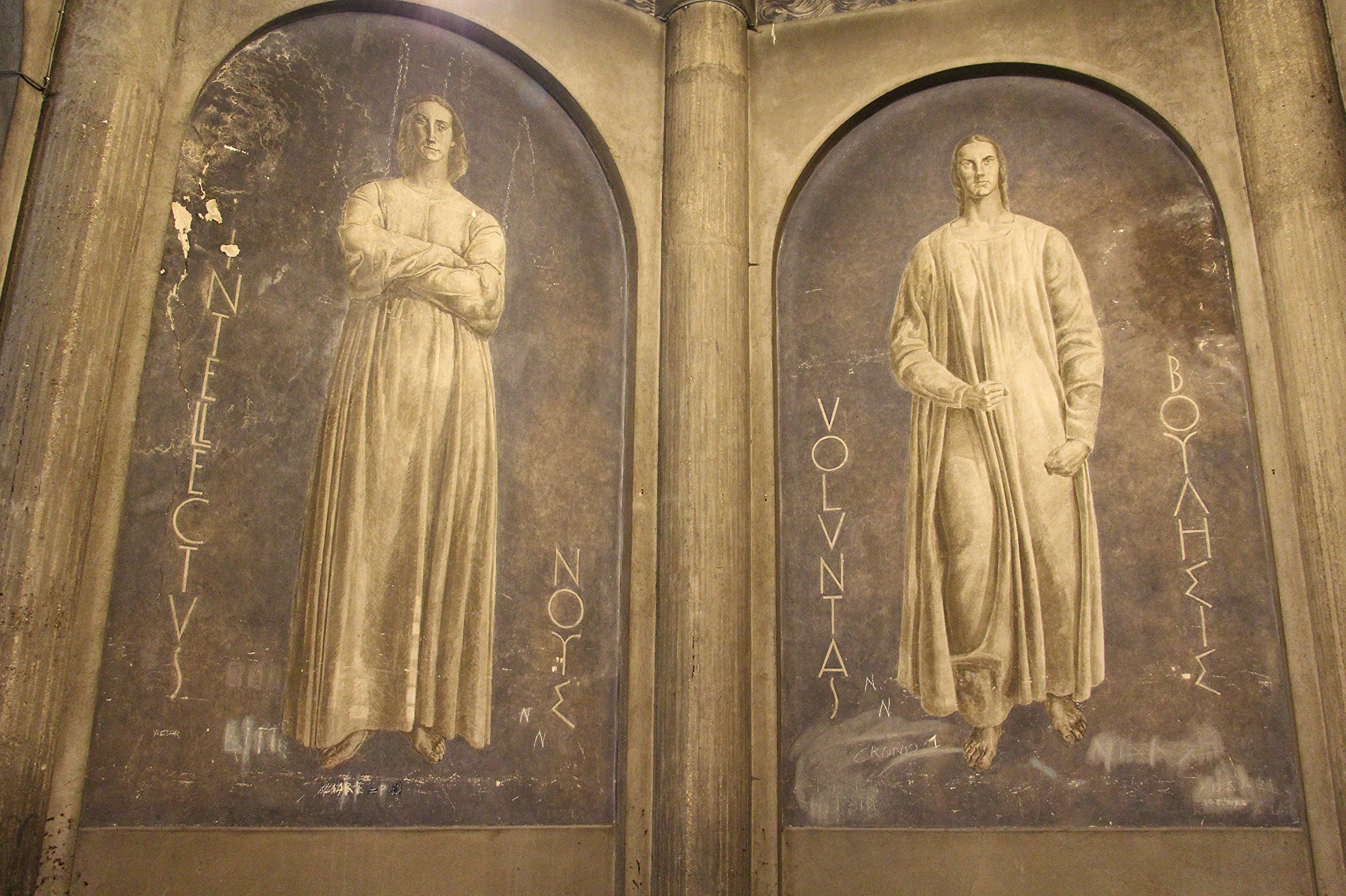
Detail of a fresco depicting the 3 faculties of the soul: thinking, feeling and willingness

== See also ==
- List of historic churches in Paris
