= Sabine Desvallières =

French embroidery artist and catholic nun (1891–1935)

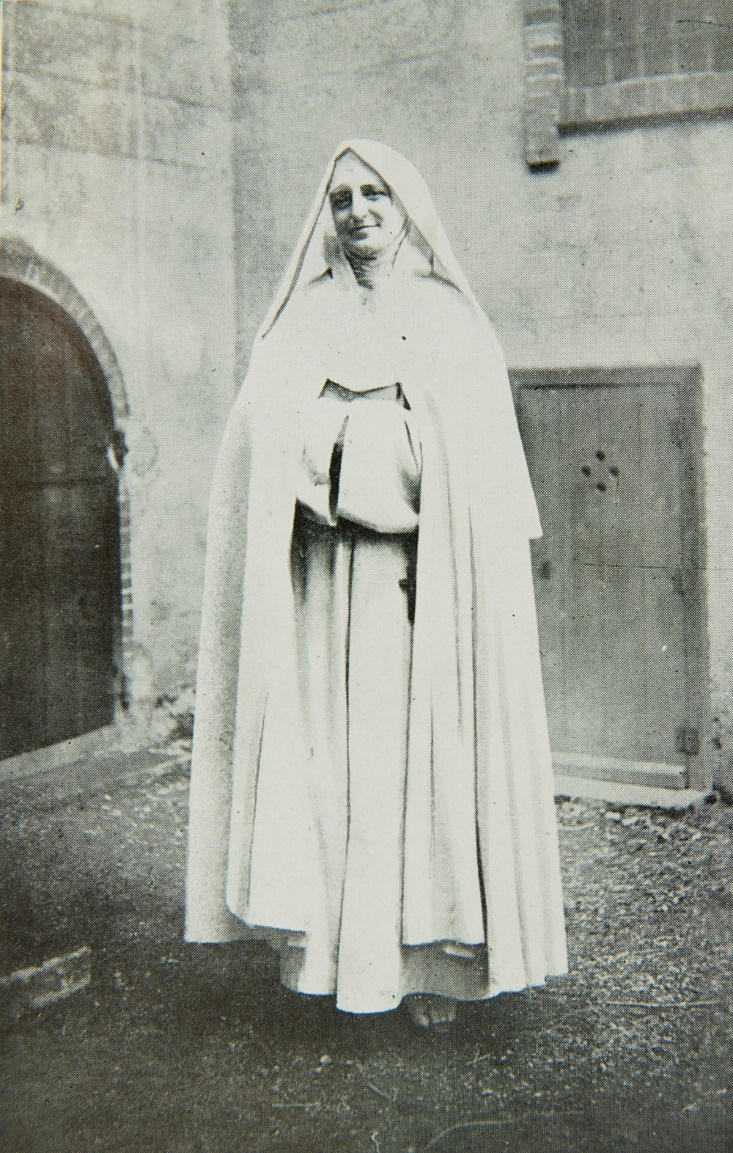
Sabine Desvallières

Sabine Desvallières (22 February 1891– 16 February 1935), also known as Sœur Marie de la Grâce, was a French embroidery artist and Catholic nun.

== Biography ==
Born into a family of artists in Paris on 22 February 1891, Sabine Desvallières was the daughter of the celebrated painter George Desvallières and his wife Marguerite Lefebvre, a piano pupil of César Franck. During her childhood, she learned art from her family. She later completed her training with the embroidery artist Blanche Ory-Robin, who introduced her to needle painting.

Desvallières began creating works of art when still young, regularly exhibiting at the Salon d'Automne, where she presented a fireplace screen in 1912 and velvet curtains in 1913. Like the other members of her family, she was devastated by the death of her brother Daniel in the First World War (March 1915). This caused her to turn to religion and to join the association of Catholic painters known as l'Arche, founded by the painters Valentine Reyre and Maurice Storez.

She then focused on embroidery, especially in connection with religious vestments and altar coverings, presenting her works at the "Art religieux" section of the Société Nationale des Beaux-Arts and, from 1922, at the Salon d'Automne.

In 1926, she was commissioned to create works for the Poor Clares Convent at Mazamet. On 20 September, she entered the convent as a postulant, taking the name of Sister Marie de la Grâce on 7 May 1927. She later founded a workshop for making chasubles at the Ateliers d'Art Sacré created by her father in 1919 gether with Maurice Denis, a French painter and decorative artist.

On several occasions, she exhibited her religious embroidery works at the Musée des Arts Décoratifs, Paris, Salon d'Automne and Société Nationale des Beaux-Arts.

Sabine Desvallières died at the Sainte-Claire Monastery in Mazamet on 16 February 1935.
