= Marguerite Huré =

French artist (1895–1967)

- Huré in her workshop at Boulogne-Billancourt.
- Born: 1895
- Died: 1967 (aged 71–72)
- Known for: Stained Glass
- Movement: brique Huré

Marguerite Huré (9 December 1895 – 27 October 1967) was a French stained glass artist who introduced abstraction into French religious glassmaking.

Huré founded her own atelier in 1920. She worked with many artists, among whom were Maurice Denis, George Desvallières, Marie Alain Couturier and Jean Bazaine; as well as architects Paul Tournon, Pierre Pouradier-Duteil, Maurice Novarina and Auguste Perret. With Perret she worked on decorations for Notre-Dame du Raincy, (1925–27), the chapel of the school of la Colombière in Chalon-sur-Saône (1929) and Saint-Joseph du Havre (1952–57). Her work may also be found at Notre-Dame-des-Missions-du-cygne d'Enghien in Épinay-sur-Seine.

Huré has been credited with producing the first set of stained glass using an abstract aesthetic, to be seen in her 1931 work at the chapel of the seminary of Voreppe.

She was also the inventor of a technique, called brique Huré, for which she received a patent in 1930.

Huré was proud of her independence in a field dominated by men, and she was frequently seen smoking a pipe. This led to her being given the nickname Jeune fille à la pipe. Her studio-house in Western Paris was two doors from that of sculptor Dora Gordine, both having been designed by Perret.
