= St. Joseph's Church, Le Havre =

Catholic church in France

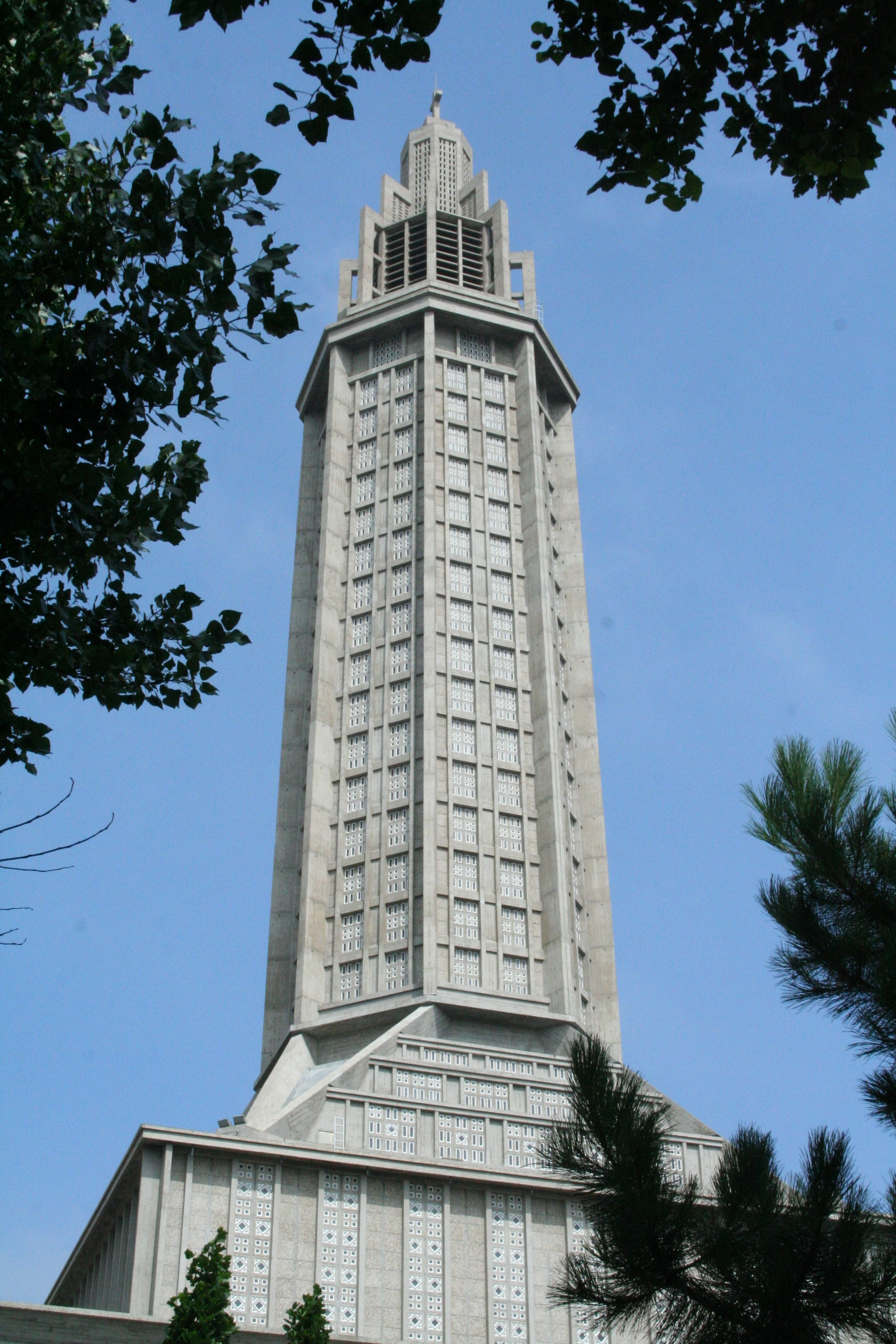
- St. Joseph's Church, Le Havre
- 49°29′27.5″N 0°6′4″E
- Denomination: Roman Catholic

History
- Dedication: Saint Joseph

Architecture
- Architectural type: church

Administration
- Diocese: Le Havre
- Parish: Saint Martin du Littoral

UNESCO World Heritage Site
- Official name: Le Havre, the City Rebuilt by Auguste Perret
- Type: Cultural
- Criteria: ii, iv
- Designated: 2005
- Reference no.: 1181
- Region: Europe and North America

St. Joseph's Church, Le Havre is a Roman Catholic church in Le Havre, France. From 1945 to 1964, the City of Le Havre commissioned Auguste Perret and his studio to head the rebuilding of the entire city after it had been completely destroyed by the British during World War II. St. Joseph's was built between 1951 and 1957/58 as part of this reconstruction. It acts as a memorial to the five thousand civilians fallen and the usual sanctuary dedicated to a patron saint; in this case Saint Joseph, fittingly the patron saint of a happy death, fathers, workers, travelers, and immigrants.

The church was designed by the chief architect for the reconstruction of Le Havre, Perret, who was the teacher and mentor to the Swiss architect Le Corbusier. A centrally-planned building, Saint Joseph's Church was envisioned as a beacon for the city. The church's single, central tower dominates the city skyline, easily visible from the city's port. Perret's vision created a building resembling a lantern, now fondly referred to as the "lantern tower" or the "lighthouse at the heart of the city". Made of concrete, St Joseph's is a product of modern architectural innovation in Post-War France. The tower is 107 meters tall and acts as a beacon visible from out at sea, especially at night when illuminated.

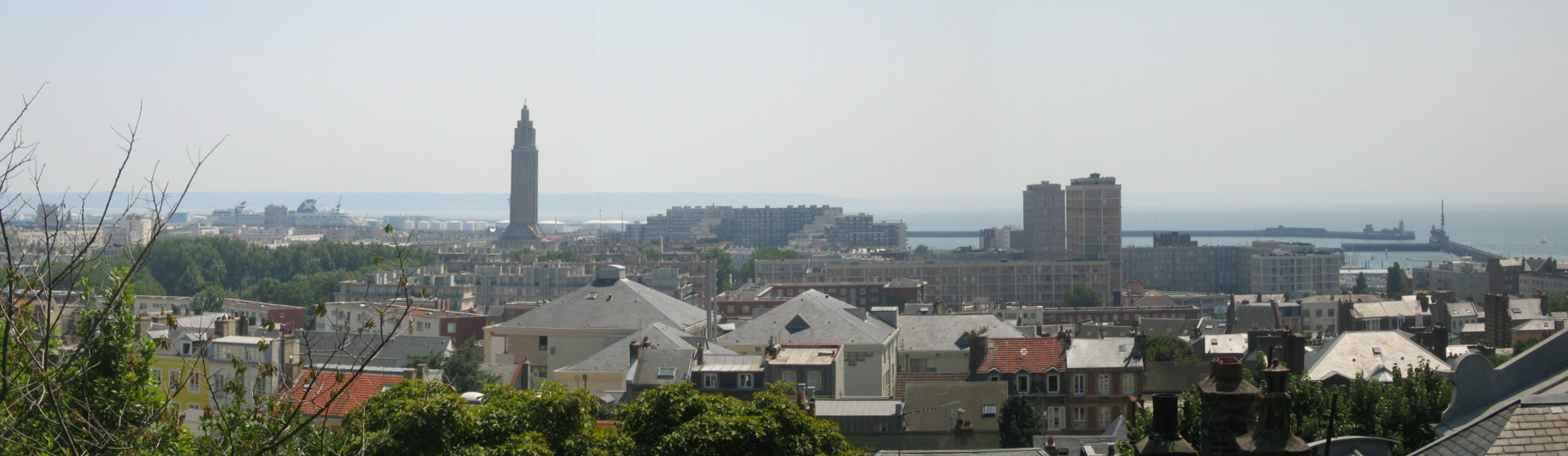
The tower of the Église Saint-Joseph dominates the reconstructed center of Le Havre

== Stained glass by Marguerite Huré ==
Perret brought in his previous colleague Marguerite Huré (1896–1967) for the stained glass in the new church. Their most notable collaborations were the Église Notre-Dame du Raincy and Saint Joseph's church in Le Havre. Huré contributed to the rebirth of sacred art in France in the early twentieth century through her introduction of abstraction into religious stained glass. She developed a style sans images or words, using color to convey her desired theme—much in the way music conveys feeling via sound. Huré and Perret shared a desire to reject decorative art in preference of constructive art that was collectively understated yet awe-inspiring and told a story or promoted further improvement/advancement. The compact nave's architectural lines lead the eye to the altar and then up to a three-tiered, square base with triangular supporting structures. The triangular supports point the eye to the octagonal column that makes up the majority of the tower. A singular, chunky, spiral staircase rises from the base of the octagonal shaft to the bell room. Separated into 18 layers, each side of layers 2 to 17 exhibits an identical, geometric pattern made of wood and elongated stained glass. Revived in the nineteenth century, Huré used the "antique" glass making technique that involves mouth-blowing the colored glass to achieve the desired shape. The repeated pattern reflects Huré's dedication to the symbolic power of color and her rejection of iconographic representation.

Each side of the octagon has its own distinctive color combination of four to six colors repeated up each layer of the side. Using a selection of seven primary colors (orange, yellow, green, purple, red, greenish and white), Huré manipulated each base color to make a total of fifty different hues. The pattern appears different depending on how close the viewer is to the windows. From far away the very geometric, organized pattern softens, the colors meld to create new hybrid colors, and the glass's shapes converge to become four dumbbell-like columns on each half of the side. The bottom of the tower has the strongest harmonized hues that gradually lighten on the way to the top giving the impression that the light comes from above, through the lighter glass. Huré organized the colors based on the cardinal directions with the dead wood and red colors on the north side, green and purple to the east, golden shades to the south, and pink and orange shades to the west. The colors vary drastically depending on the photo used as reference, but each group emanates a distinctive tone drawn from the various interactions and optical mixing of the different colors. The glass's placement and choice of color follow a symbolic code that organizes colors and shapes per research by the Atelier d'Art Sacré (the Sacred Art Workshop) on theological virtues. The overall feel of this tower is that of being in a kaleidoscopic tunnel whose colors converge to create a "symphonic poem", an overwhelming assault of color.

While the first example of non-figurative symbolism in religious stained glass was Huré's work at the Voreppe seminary chapel, she takes her abstraction one step farther with St Joseph's by abandoning symbolic geometric design to focus purely on her exploration of the emotional arousal of color. Throughout her life, Huré continued to make figurative stained glass pieces, though her re-imagination of religious iconography through color symbolism and geometric abstraction was her largest contribution to art history.

== Notes ==
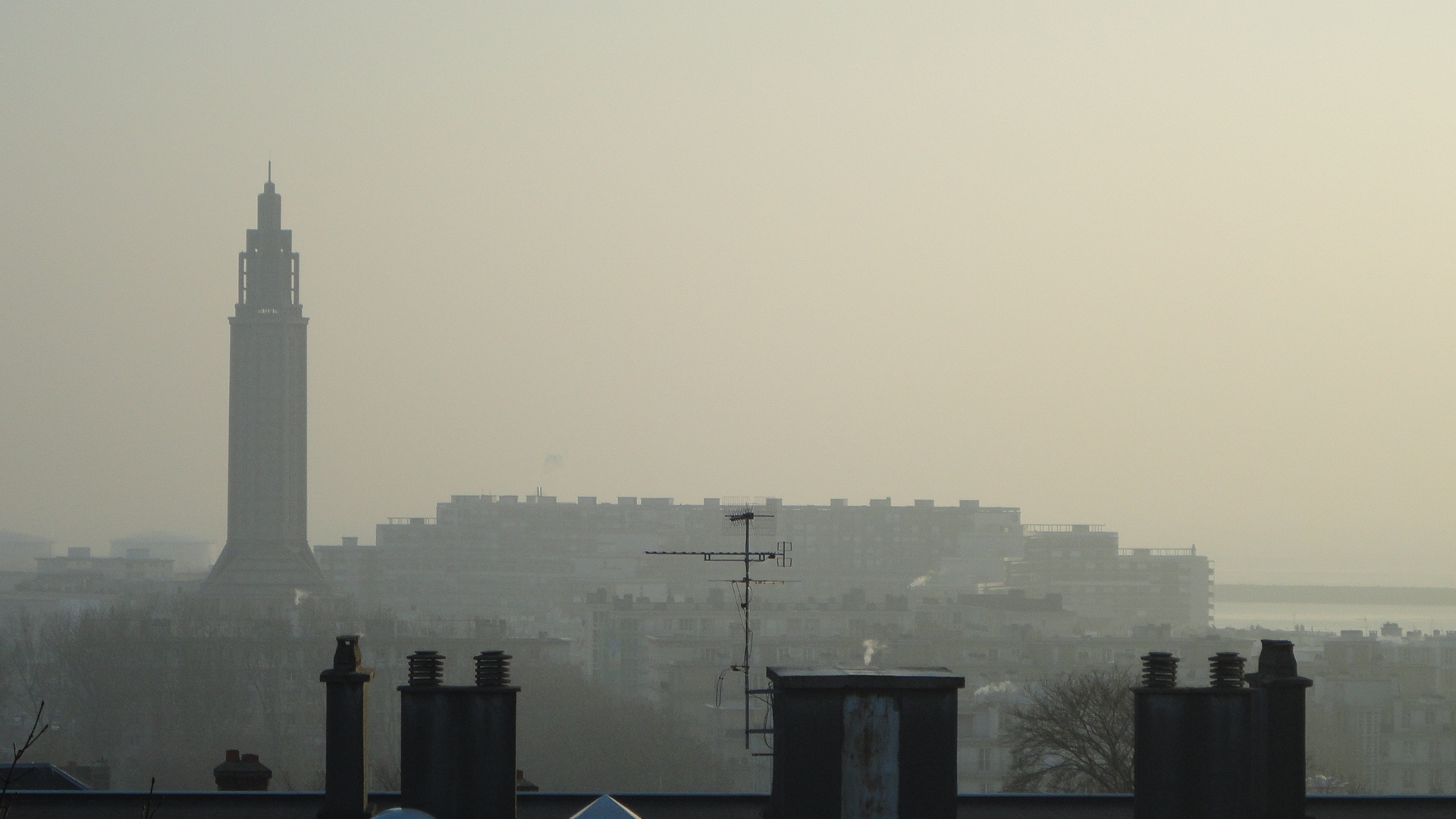
Photo of St. Joseph's Church in the mist
