= Auguste Perret =

French architect (1874–1954)

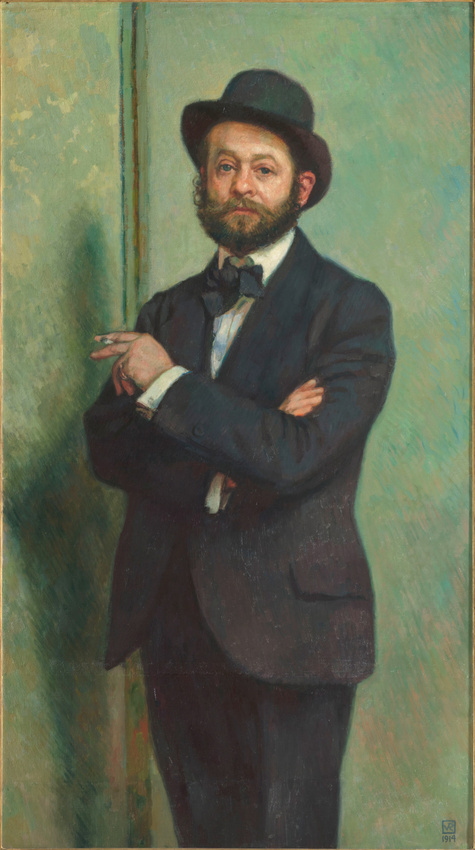
- Portrait of Auguste Perret (1914) by Théo van Rysselberghe
- Born: 12 February 1874; Ixelles, Belgium
- Died: 25 February 1954 (aged 80); Paris, France
- Occupation: Architect
- Awards: AIA Gold Medal (1952)
- Buildings: Théâtre des Champs-Élysées; St. Joseph's Church, Le Havre; French Economic, Social and Environmental Council; Église Notre-Dame du Raincy

Auguste Perret (French pronunciation: [ɔɡyst(ə) pɛʁɛ]; 12 February 1874 – 25 February 1954) was a French architect and a pioneer of the architectural use of reinforced concrete. His major works include the Théâtre des Champs-Élysées, the first Art Deco building in Paris; the Church of Notre-Dame du Raincy (1922–23); the Mobilier National in Paris (1937); and the French Economic, Social and Environmental Council building in Paris (1937–39). After World War II he designed a group of buildings in the centre of the port city of Le Havre, including St. Joseph's Church, Le Havre, to replace buildings destroyed by bombing during World War II. His reconstruction of the city is now a World Heritage Site for its exceptional urban planning and architecture.

== Early life and experiments (1874–1912) ==
Auguste Perret was born in Ixelles, Belgium, where his father, a stonemason, had taken refuge after the Paris Commune. He received his early education in architecture in the family firm. He was accepted in the architecture course of the École des Beaux-Arts in Paris, along with his two brothers, Gustave (1876–1952) and Claude (1880–1960). where he studied under Julien Guadet, a Beaux Arts neoclassicist who had collaborated with Charles Garnier on the construction of the Paris Opera. Beyond the neoclassical rationalism he learned from Gaudet, Perret's particular interest was the structure of buildings and the use of new materials, such as concrete. Though he was considered a brilliant student, he left school without obtaining a diploma and went to work for the family firm.

Perret immediately began experimenting with concrete. His first important project was an apartment building on rue Franklin in Paris (1903), where the concrete structure, instead of being concealed, was clearly visible and was a part of the exterior design. He made an even more radical experiment with the construction of a garage on rue de Ponthieu (1906) (now destroyed) with a simplified cubic structure expressing the interior, large bays of windows and a lack of decoration, which resembled the later International Style.

== Early works (1913–1939) ==
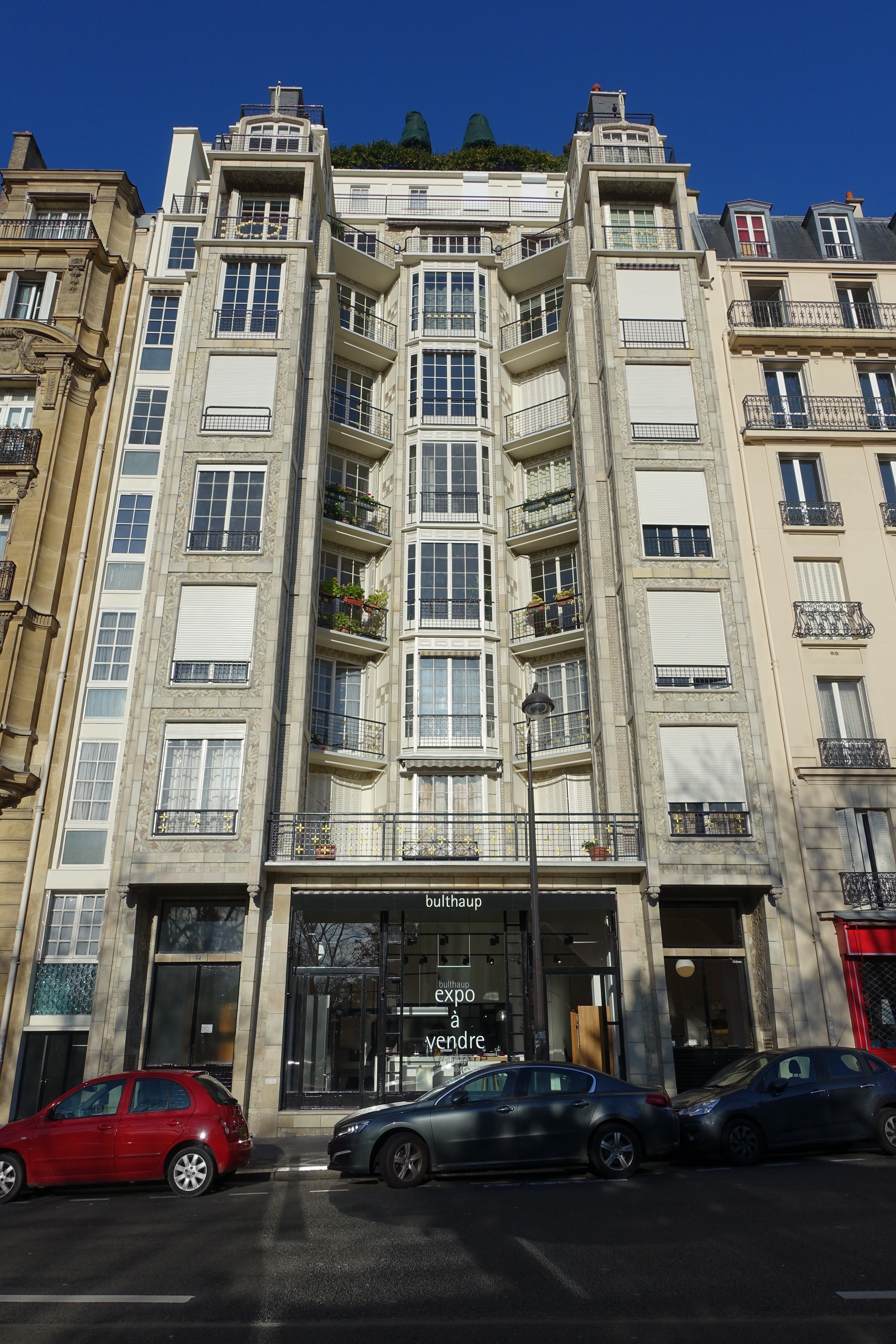
Reinforced-concrete apartment building at 25 rue Benjamin Franklin, Paris (1903)

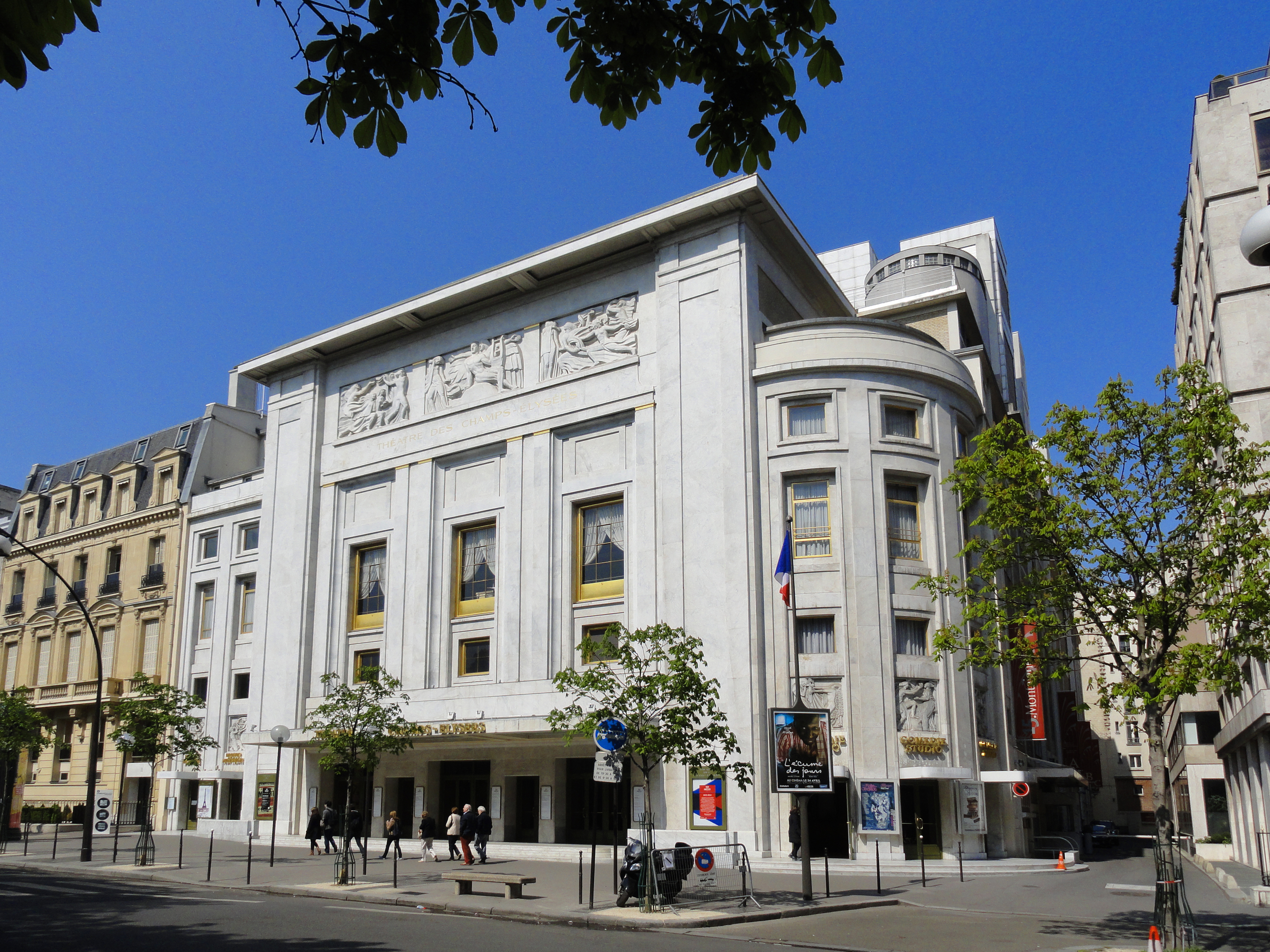
Théâtre des Champs-Élysées, Paris (1913)

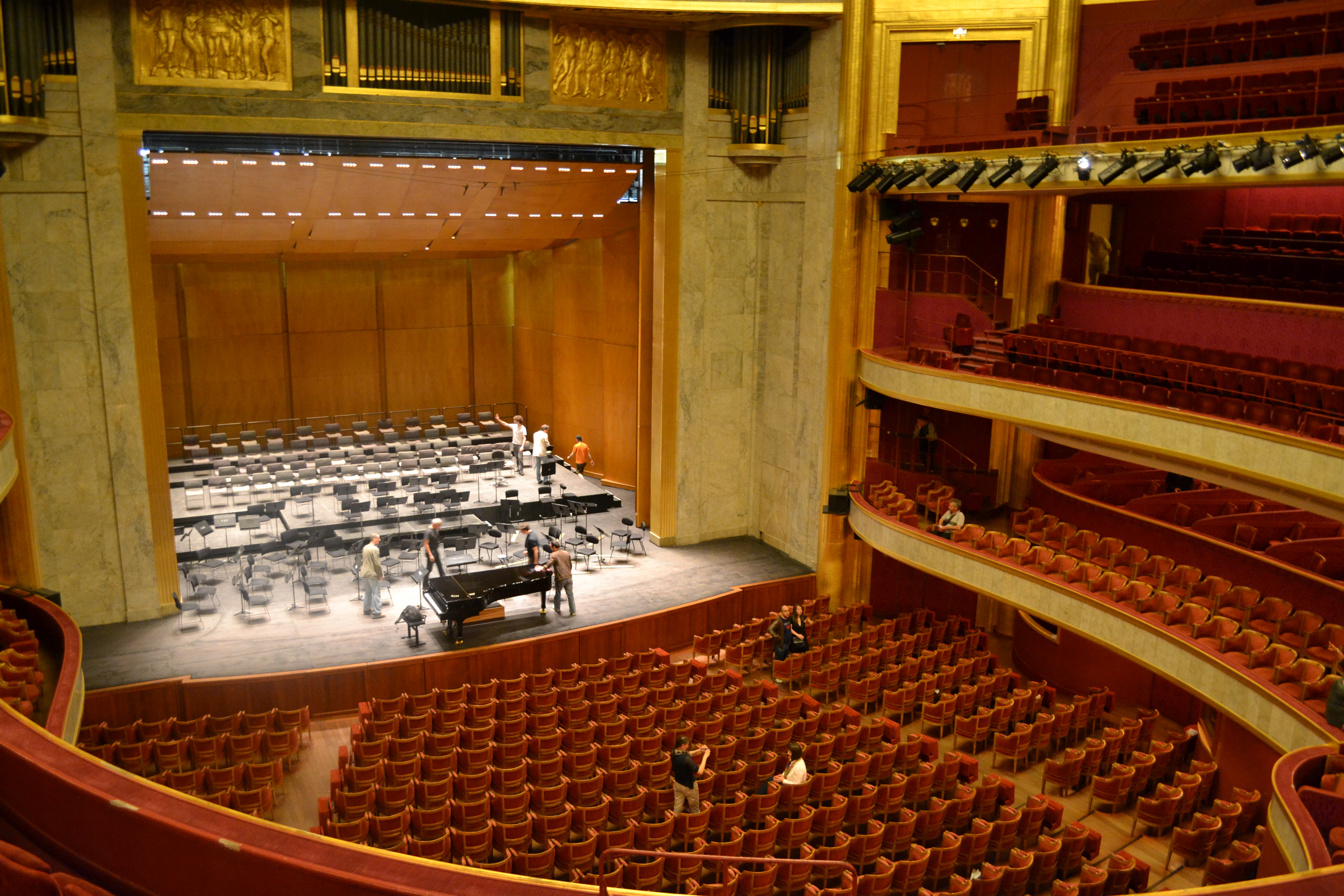
Interior of the Théâtre des Champs-Élysées (1913)

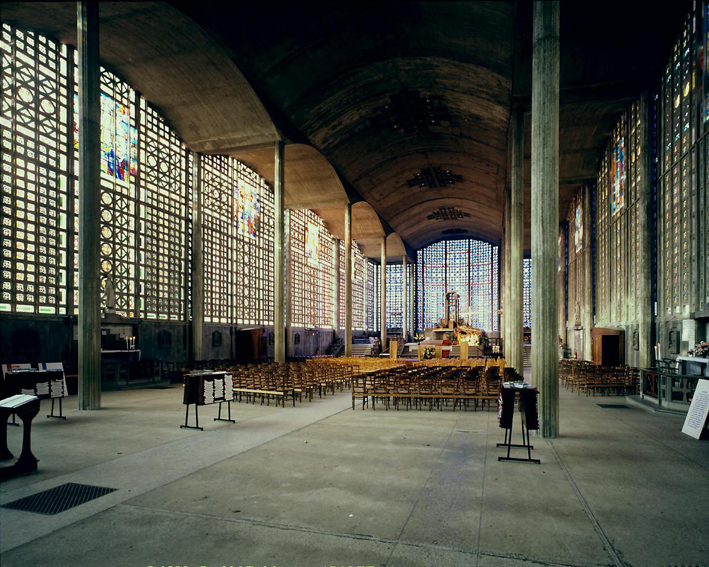
Interior of the Church of Notre Dame du Raincy (1922–23)

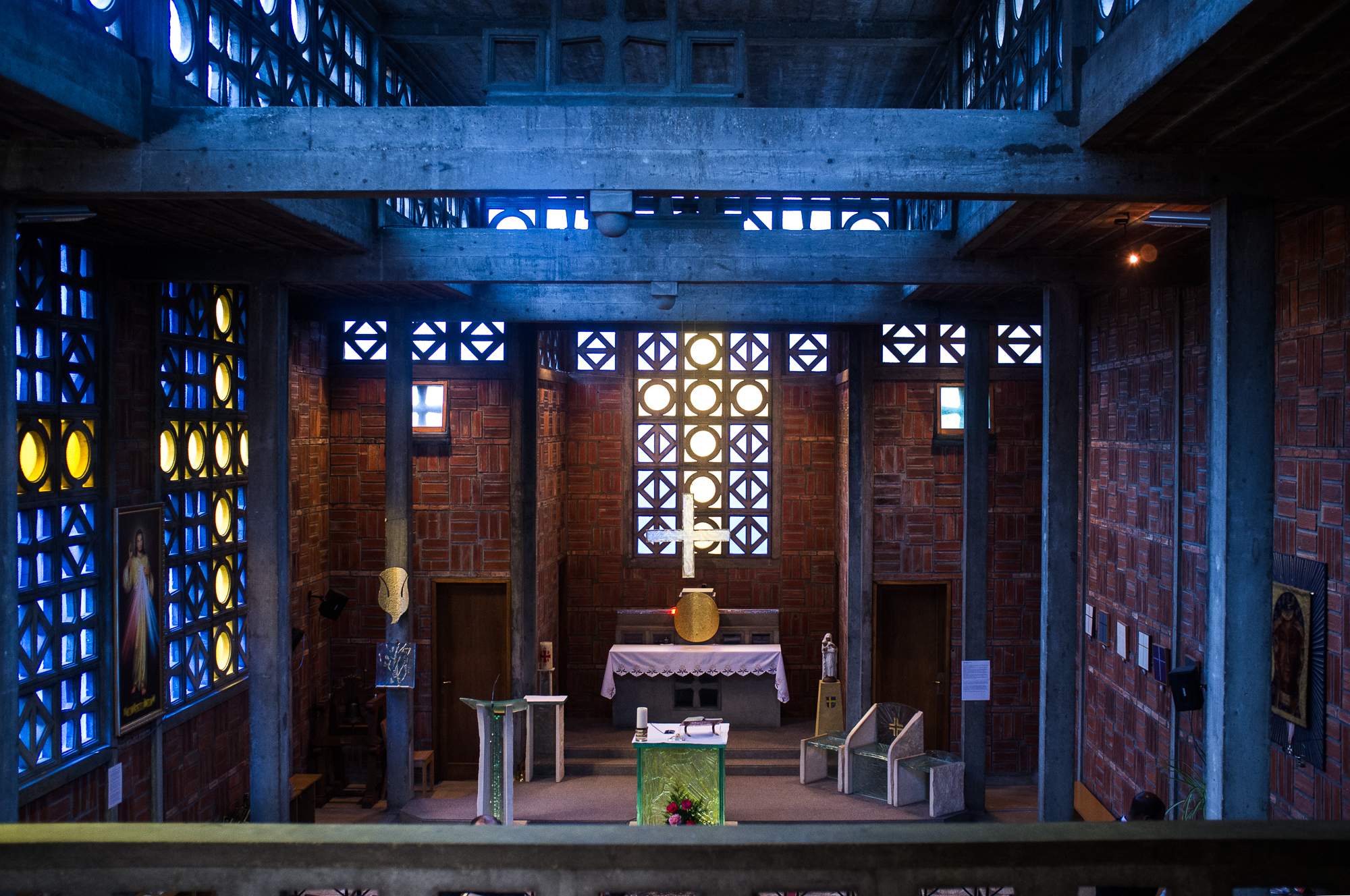
The Chapel of Immaculate Conception in Arcueil (1930)

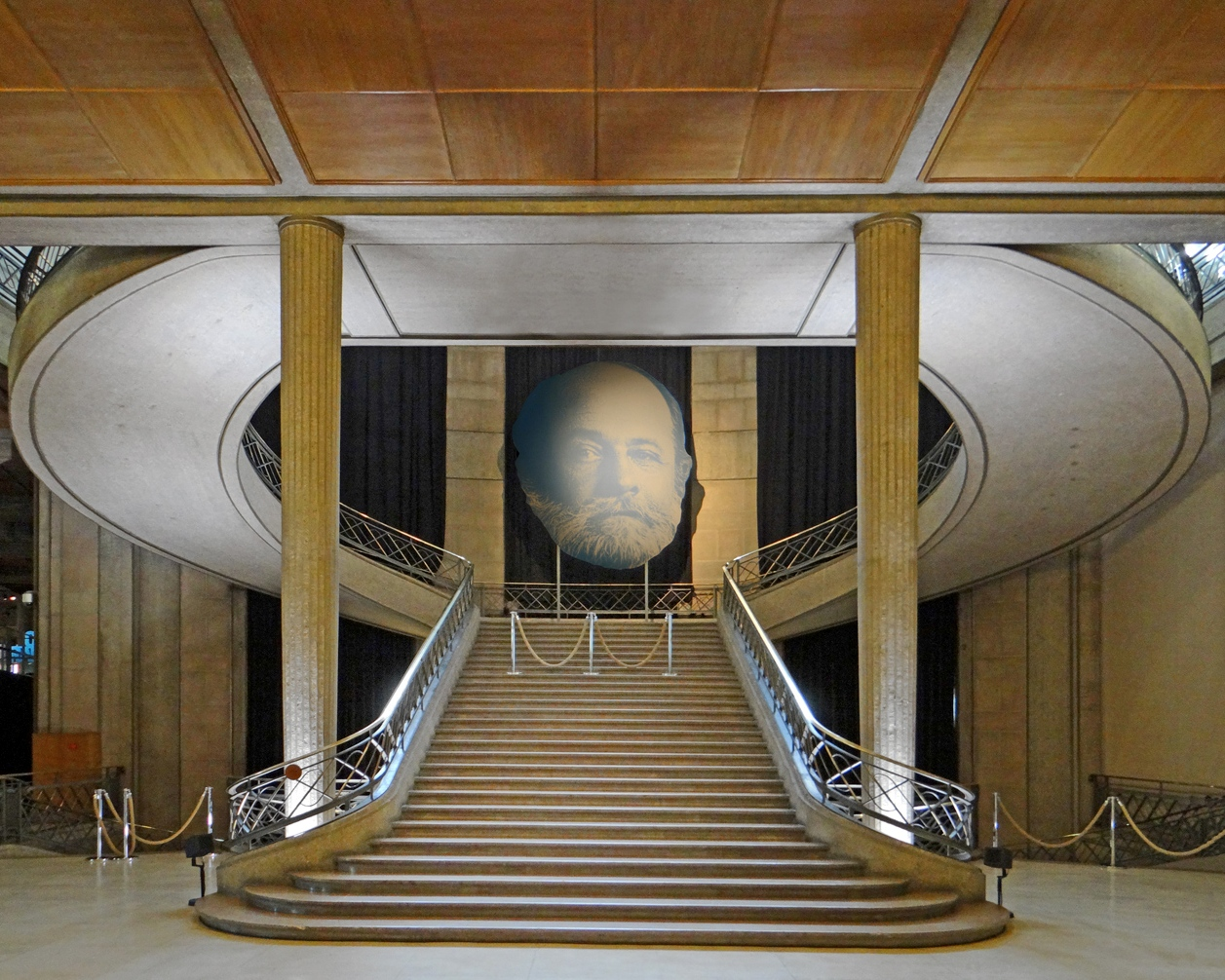
Grand stairway of the Conseil économique, social et environnemental, Paris (1937)

Perret's most famous building was the Théâtre des Champs-Élysées a project which he took over from the Art Nouveau architect Henry van de Velde. The facade was simple and decorated only with a sculptural bas-relief by Antoine Bourdelle. The corner of the building was smooth and rounded, anticipating the Streamline Moderne style three decades later. Thanks to the use of concrete pillars, the interior lobby and the theater itself was vast and open, unobstructed by columns. The interior decoration featured works by the modernist artists of the day; a dome by Maurice Denis, paintings by Édouard Vuillard and Jacqueline Marval, and a stage curtain by Ker-Xavier Roussel.

In his later works, Perret used concrete in imaginative ways to achieve the functions of his buildings, while preserving classical harmony, symmetry and proportions. His major works included the building of the French Economic, Social and Environmental Council, originally built for the Museum of Public Works of the 1937 Paris Exposition; and the Mobilier Nationale, the national government furniture atelier in Paris. He also created innovative industrial buildings, including a warehouse in Casablanca covered with a think veil of concrete (1915); the Perret Tower, the first concrete tower for the International Exhibition of Hydropower and Tourism of Grenoble (1925), to demonstrate his "Order of Concrete"; and the church of Notre Dame du Raincy (1922–23), where the interior columns were left undecorated and the concrete vaults of the ceiling became the most prominent decorative feature. He experimented with concrete forms to achieve the best acoustics for the concert hall of the École Normale de Musique de Paris in Paris. (1929)

== Later works (1945–1954) ==
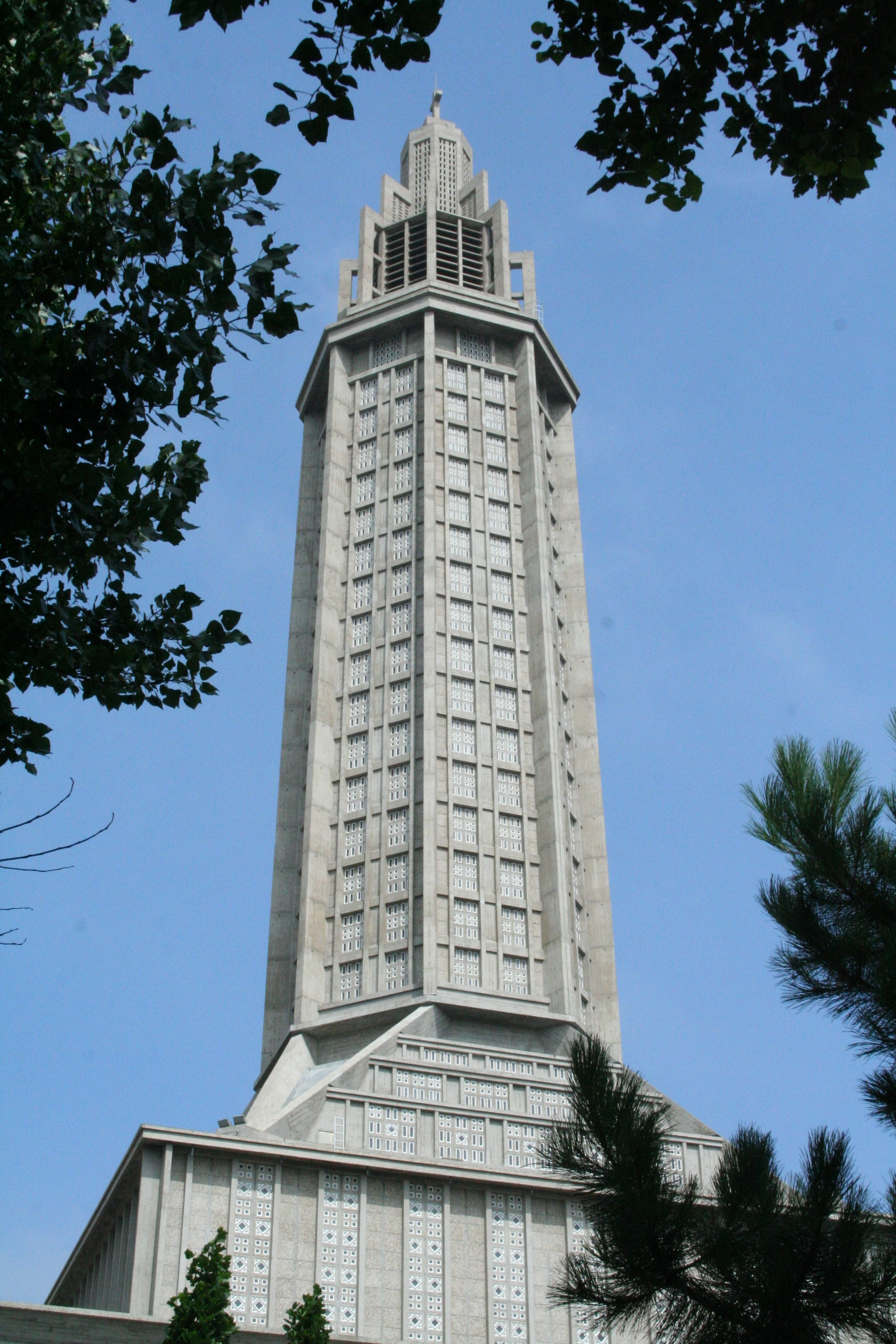
Spire of St. Joseph's Church, Le Havre (1951–58)

Tower of Le Havre City Hall (1953–58)

In 1952, Perret completed construction of the Saclay Nuclear Research Centre in the Paris suburb of Essonne. He described this campus as a "small Versailles for nuclear research". Most of France's early nuclear reactors were constructed within the site.

Perret's other major postwar projects included the reconstruction of the center of the port of Le Havre, which had been almost totally destroyed during the war. His first plan was rejected as too ambitious, but his modified plans were followed. He also participated in the postwar reconstruction of the Marseille port and of Amiens.

Perret's last major work, finished after his death, was the St. Joseph's Church, Le Havre, (1951–58) whose most prominent feature is its tower, like a lighthouse, 107 meters high, and visible at sea.

== Later life, honors and legacy ==
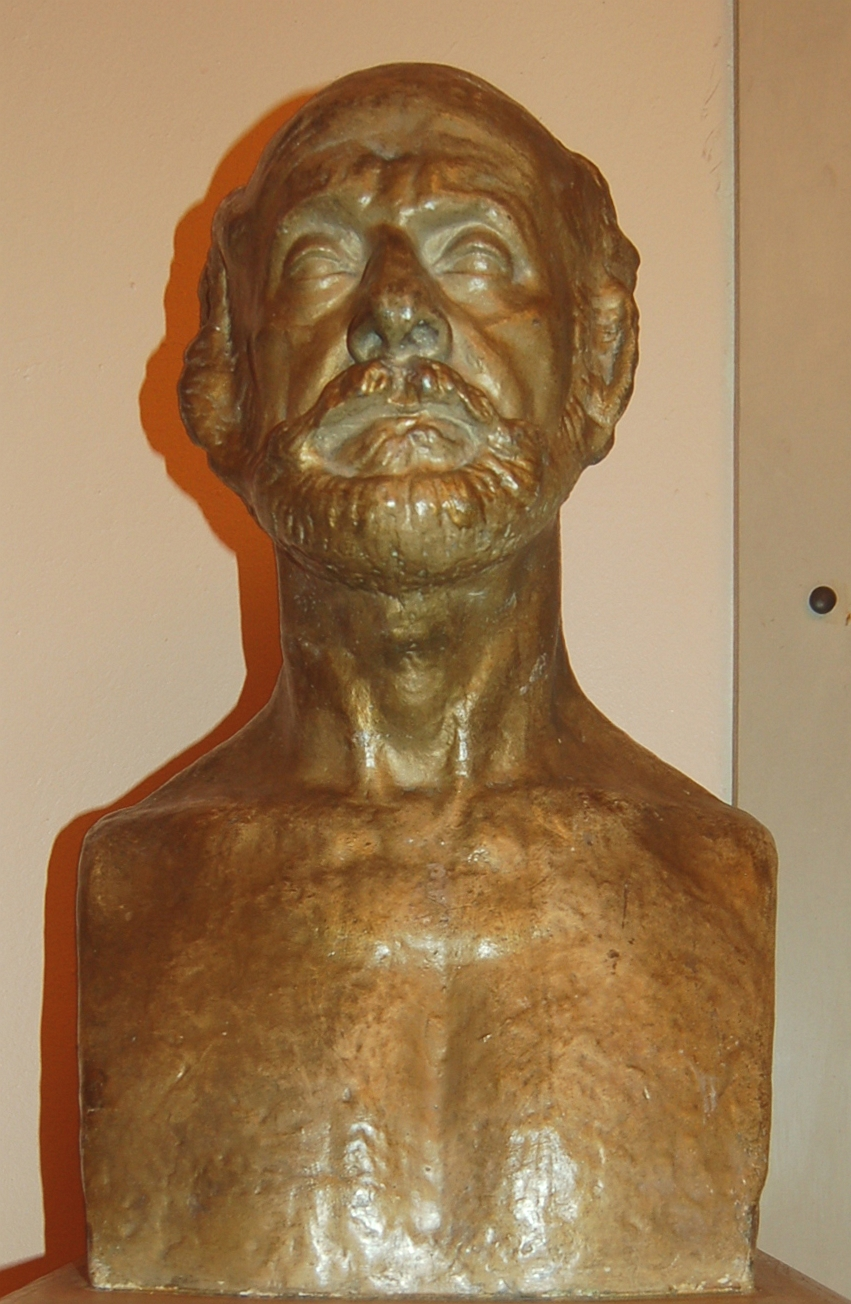
Bust of Auguste Perret in Paris

Among the many young architects who worked in the office of Perret from 1908 to 1910 was Charles-Édouard Jeanneret-Gris, who later became known as Le Corbusier; it was his first experience in an architectural firm.

From 1940, Perret taught at the École des Beaux-Arts. He won the Royal Gold Medal in 1948 and the AIA Gold Medal in 1952. His work was also part of the architecture event in the art competition at the 1948 Summer Olympics.

Perret also served as a juror with Florence Meyer Blumenthal in awarding the Prix Blumenthal, a grant given between 1919 and 1954 to young French painters, sculptors, decorators, engravers, writers, and musicians.

In 1998, the Perret Tower in Grenoble was declared a national heritage site by France.

In 2005, his reconstruction of Le Havre was declared a World Heritage Site by UNESCO.

== List of major works ==
- Rue Franklin apartments, Paris, 1902–1904
- Garage Ponthieu, Paris, 1907
- Théâtre des Champs-Élysées, Paris, 1913
- Concrete cathedral in Le Raincy, France, Église Notre-Dame du Raincy, 1923, with stained-glass work by Marguerite Huré
- Perret tower, Grenoble, 1925
- La maison-ateliers Chana Orloff, 7 bis villa Seurat, Paris, 1926
- Villa Aghion, Alexandria, 1928 (demolished between 2009 and 2016)
- Concert hall of the École Normale de Musique de Paris, 1929
- Hôtel Saint-Georges, Beirut, Lebanon 1932
- Immeuble Lange, 9 place de la Porte-de-Passy, Paris (1929–1932)
- Services Techniques des Constructions Navales, 8 boulevard du General-Martial-Valin (15th arron.) Paris, 1929–1932; an example of a framework of exposed concrete columns.
- Building, 51-55 rue Raynouard (16th arr.) Paris, (1932), where Perret had his offices
- Palais Iéna, Paris, 1937, originally built as the Museum of Public Works for the 1937 Paris Exposition, now home of the French Economic, Social and Environmental Council
- Extensions to the École nationale supérieure des Beaux-Arts, Paris, 1945
- City Hall, St. Joseph's Church and further reconstruction of the French city of Le Havre after more than 80,000 inhabitants of that city were left homeless following World War II, 1949–1956
- Restaurant #1 of CEA Paris-Saclay, 1952
- Gare d'Amiens, 1955

== Honours and awards ==
- Chevalier of the Order of Legion of Honour (1926)
- Officier of the Order of Legion of Honour (1926)
- Commandeur of the Order of Legion of Honour (1926)
- Grand Officier of the Order of Legion of Honour (1926)
- Officer of the Order of the Oak Crown (Luxemburg)
- Medal of Honor for Public Assistance (Médaille d'honneur de l'assistance publique)

== See also ==
- Art Deco in Paris
- Architecture of Paris
- Paris architecture of the Belle Époque
- Fernand Pouillon
- Fabien Vienne
