= Église Notre-Dame du Raincy =

Catholic church

Coordinates: 48°53′45″N 2°30′49″E

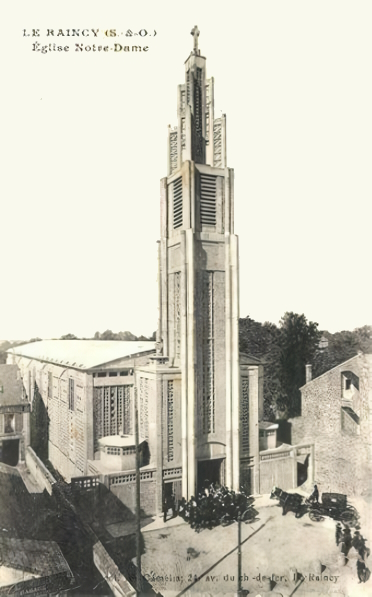
Church of Notre Dame du Raincy

The Église Notre-Dame du Raincy (Church of Notre Dame du Raincy) is a Roman Catholic church in the commune of Le Raincy near Paris. It was built in 1922-23 by the French architects Auguste Perret and Gustave Perret. The edifice is considered a monument of modernism in architecture, using reinforced concrete in a manner that expresses the possibilities of the new material.

== Design and construction ==
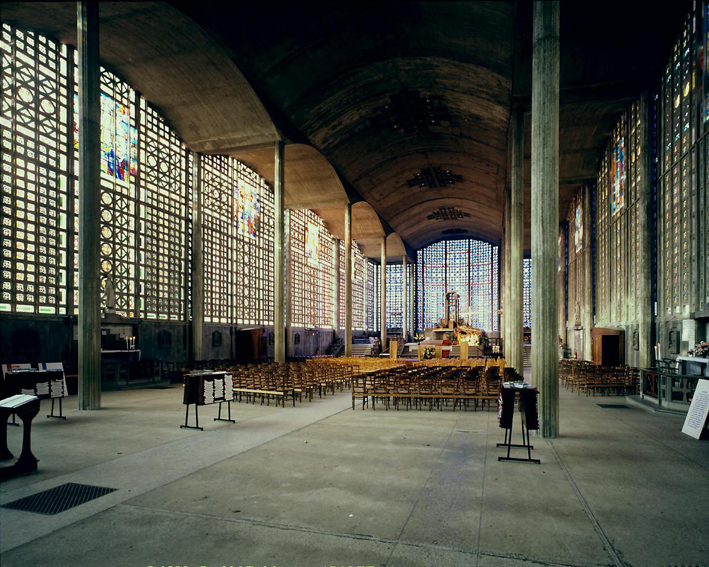
Interior of the Church

At the beginning of the 20th century, Le Raincy was a small parish church for suburbs whose population was rapidly growing.

In 1918, the parish priest of Le Raincy, Felix Nègre, proposed to build a church to commemorate the French victory in the Battle of the Marne in 1914. Through connections among parishioners, Nègre came into contact with the Perrets. The design used concrete for economy. Rather than attempting to simulate masonry, the new material was used on its own terms, with standardized elements, slender supports, and thin membranes pierced by windows. The perimeter walls are non-load-bearing and assembled from square precast concrete panels, or claustra, pierced with geometrical openings that carry the glazing; a limited number of standardized patterns is combined across the building.

The completed church received widespread favorable attention, influencing architectural thought at a time of rebuilding and economic recovery.

=== Glass ===
The stained glass was created by Marguerite Huré using colored coatings on clear glass for economy. The colors are dominated by blues near the entry and progress to warmer tones in the sanctuary.

=== Organ ===
The 1875 John Abbey organ belonging to the original parish church was moved to the new church. Changes made in 1957 changed its character. Public donations are now being sought for a new organ. The new organ was inaugurated by Pierre Pincemaille on october, the 17th of 2010.

== Restoration ==
At the time of the church's construction, concrete was still an experimental material. Deterioration was evident by the 1960s, and analysis showed that the original concrete mix contained an excess of lime and water. Coverage of the steel reinforcing rods was also inadequate, especially in the thin members of the tower, which were exposed to rain.

The church was listed as a historic monument in 1966. Two programmes of conservative restoration have been undertaken by Caisse Nationale des Monuments Historiques since 1990, the more recent benefitting from developments in technique for restoring reinforced concrete and its steel reinforcements.

== Copies ==
In 1937, at the Tokyo Woman's Christian University, a chapel was built that was similar to Notre-Dame du Raincy. It is around half the size. The copy by architect Antonín Raymond was unauthorised. Christine Viskenne-Auzanneau argues that: "Reimann knew about Notre Dame du Raincy".

The Czech architect Bedřich Feuerstein came to Tokyo in 1926 and worked with Reimann between 1926 and 1931, after working a year in France with the Perret brothers.

Three Brussels churches, the Church of St. John the Baptist in Molenbeek-Saint-Jean, the Church of St. Augustine in Forest and the Church of St. Susanna in Schaerbeek, are also inspired by Notre-Dame du Raincy.

The Raincy church also led to other inspirations in Japan.
