= Robert Poughéon =

French painter

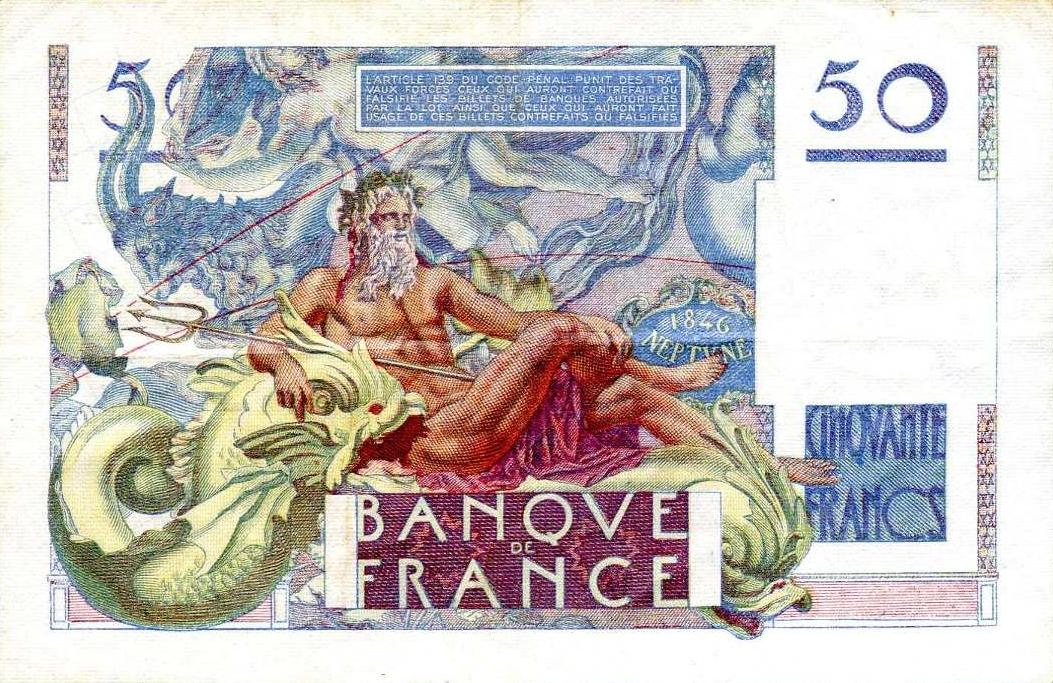
- French fifty-franc bank note based on a painting by Poughéon, printed 1945–1951.
- Born: 18 July 1886; Paris, France
- Died: 1 March 1955 (aged 68)
- Education: Jean-Paul Laurens, Albert Besnard; École des Beaux-Arts, École des Arts Décoratifs
- Known for: painting
- Notable work: Amazones
- Movement: Art Deco
- Awards: Prix de Rome, Légion d'Honneur

Eugène Robert Poughéon (18 July 1886 – 1 March 1955) born in Paris, was a French artist, painter, illustrator and museum curator.

== Biography ==
Poughéon studied under Jean-Paul Laurens and Albert Besnard at the École des Beaux-Arts in Paris and later at the École des Arts Décoratifs with Charles Lameire.

In 1914 Poughéon won the Prix de Rome. In 1927, he was awarded the silver medal at the Paris Salon, and two years later the gold medal. In 1935 he started teaching at the École des Beaux-Arts and at the Académie Julian. He was made director of the French Academy in Rome in 1942, and soon after became curator of the Musée Jacquemart-André.

Besides his paintings, murals, frescoes, and decors, Poughéon also illustrated books as well as providing artwork for banknotes.

The Snake, c. 1930, Centre Pompidou, on display at the Musée d’Art et d’Industrie in Roubaix (La Piscine)

== See also ==
- Art Deco

== Bibliography ==
- Alain Lesieutre, The Spirit and Splendour of Art Deco, Paddington Press
- Norma, Bordeaux années 20-30: de Paris à l'Aquitaine, 2008
