= George Desvallières =

French painter (1861–1950)

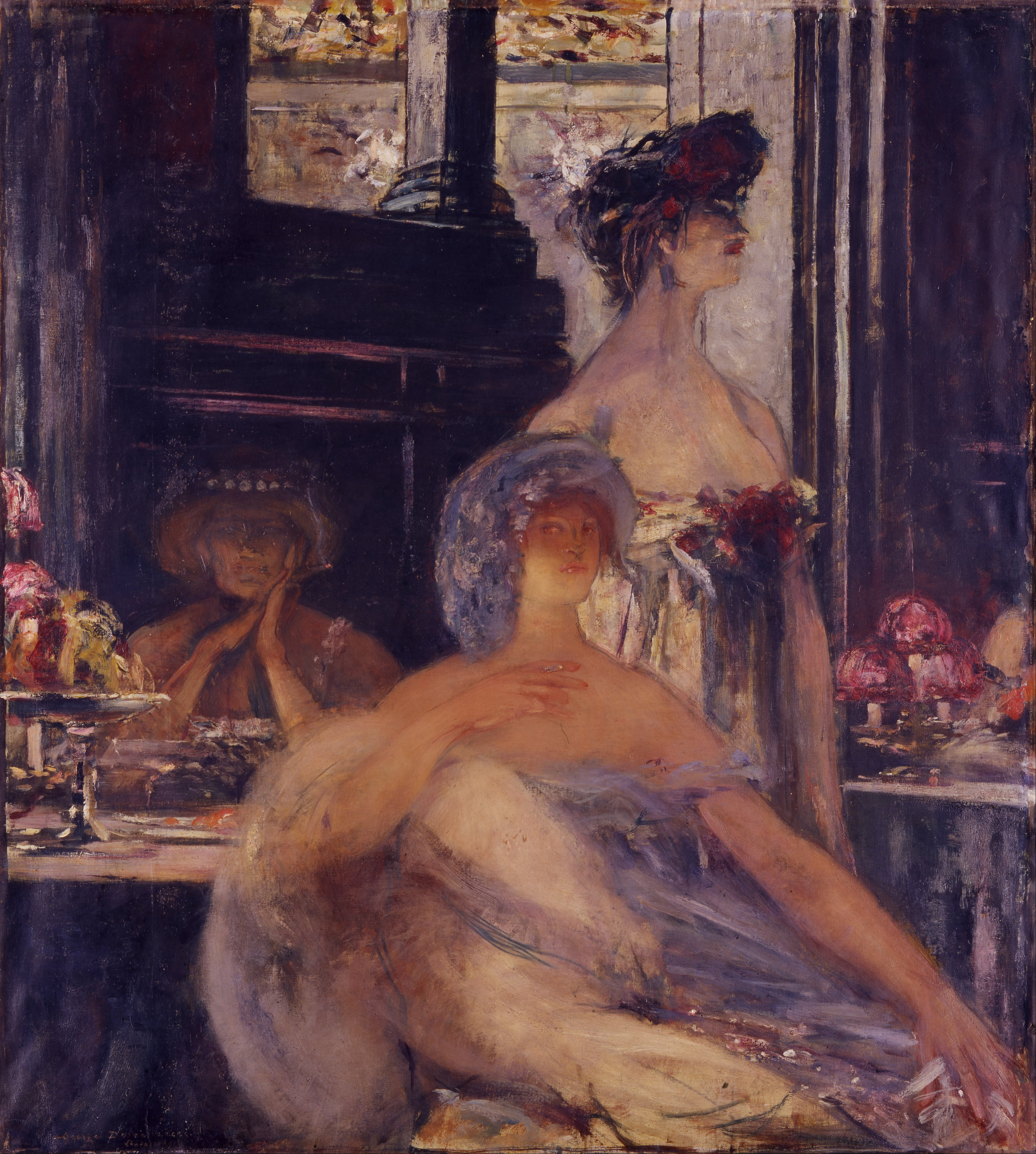
Music Hall. 1903. 153 × 138.5 cm. Ohara Museum of Art

George Desvallières (French pronunciation: [ʒɔʁʒ devaljɛʁ]; 1861–1950) was a French painter.

A native of Paris, Desvallières was a great-grandson of academician Gabriel-Marie Legouvé, and received a religious upbringing. He studied at the Académie Julian with Tony Robert-Fleury and with Jules Valadon at the École des Beaux-Arts. He painted portraits at first, but a relationship with Gustave Moreau turned him towards an interest in mythology and religion. His daughter, Sabine Desvallières, who later became a nun, is remembered for her embroidery.

Desvallières became acquainted with ancient art during a trip to Italy in 1890 and, upon his return, began working in the style with which he was most associated: combining dark subjects and violent color with a dramatic conception of religion. He took as his subjects numerous symbolist characters, such as Narcissus (in 1901), Orpheus (1902), and The Marche Towards the Ideal (1903); he also served as one of the founders of the Salon d'Automne. In 1919 he founded the Ateliers d'Art Sacré with Maurice Denis in an attempt to renew interest in religious art. The atelier served a similar function to that performed by artists' studios in the Middle Ages. Desvallières became interested in religious art when his son was killed in 1915 during World War I; he himself had commanded a battalion in the Vosges during the war.

Desvallières also tackled a number of public and private decorative programs related to the war; among these were stained glass windows for the Douaumont ossuary and for a church in Pawtucket, Rhode Island. He also illustrated a number of books and plays, including Edmond Rostand's La Princesse Lointaine and Rolla by Alfred de Musset. Until 1950 he also received State commissions.

Works by Desvallières may be found in the Musée d'Orsay, the Musée du Louvre, and the Musée des Beaux-Arts de la Ville de Paris. He died in Paris in 1950.
