= Pauline Peugniez =

French painter and stained-glass artist (1890-1987)

- Born: 28 April 1890; Amiens, France
- Died: 15 June 1987 (aged 97); Paris
- Occupations: Painter and Stained-glass artist

Pauline Peugniez (born 28 April 1890, in Amiens died 15 June 1987, in Paris) was a French painter and stained glass artist. She was a student of Maurice Denis. Between the two world wars, she made a significant contribution to the revival of Religious art with her stained glass and Fresco in churches.

== Life ==
Pauline Peugniez came from a middle-class family; her father was a surgeon and her maternal grandfather was a notary. After graduating from high school, she studied at the École des Beaux-Arts in Amiens and at the Beaux-Arts de Paris. There she met her future husband, Jean Hébert-Stevens, a cousin of the architect Robert Mallet-Stevens, whom she married in 1915.

While she continued her studies, her husband became a renowned stained glass artist. Her acquaintance with Marie-Alain Couturier, a Dominican Order, and her work at the Studios of Sacred Art founded in 1919 by Maurice Denis and George Desvallières, led Pauline and her husband to devote themselves mainly to the design of stained glass.

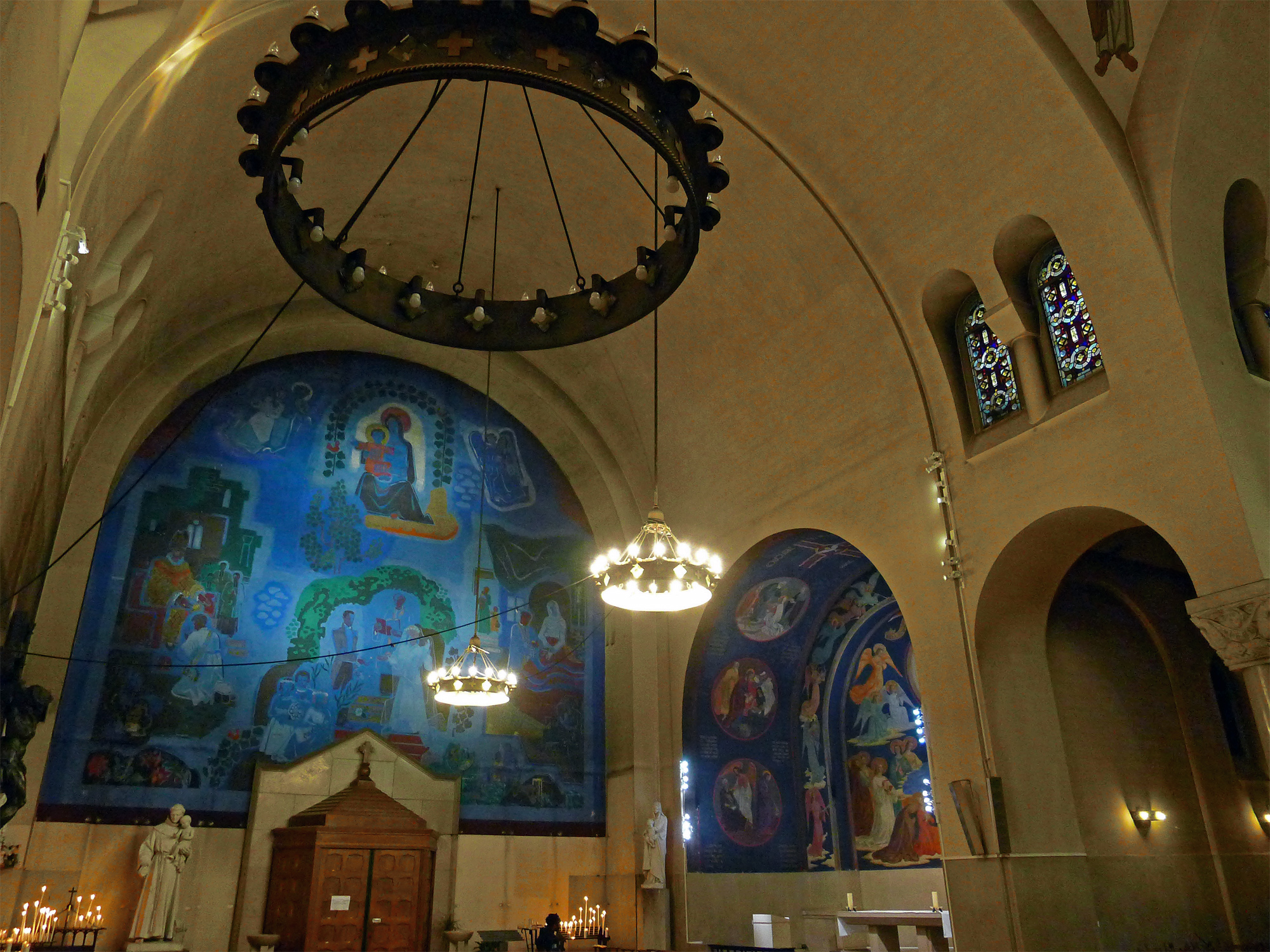
Church of Saint-Ferdinand-des-Ternes (Chapel of the Virgin), left transept. The fresco by Pauline Peugniez depicts the sacraments of ordination, marriage, and extreme unction – Paris, 17th century

In 1923, they established a joint workshop on Rue Bagneau in Paris. In 1937, they were commissioned to design windows for the nave of Notre-Dame de Paris. she also created cartoons for tapestries produced by the Gobelins factory in Paris and for the Aubusson tapestries. she participated in exhibitions at the Société Nationale des Beaux-Arts, the Salon des Tuileries, and the Salon d'Automne (from 1920 onwards).

== Works ==
- Wall painting in the church of Saint-Esprit in Paris (12th arrondissement of Paris)
- Wall painting (Sacraments) in the church of Saint-Ferdinand-des-Ternes in Paris (17th arrondissement of Paris)
- Windows in the Church of Saint-Valentin in Attenschwiller
- Window (apse) in the church of Notre-Dame-des-Missions-du-cygne d'Enghien in Épinay-sur-Seine
- Windows in the parish church in Hangard (Somme (department)
- Windows in the parish church in Nanteuil-le-Haudouin
- Windows in the parish church in Plaine
- Windows in the parish church in Le Plessier-Rozainvillers (Département Somme)
- Windows in the Church of Saint-Martin in Sondersdorf
- Windows in the abbey Solesmes Abbey
- Windows in the parish church in Vouël (Gemeinde Tergnier), 1930
- Window in Notre-Dame de Paris, around 1937
- windows in the Saint-Germain de Charonne, Paris (20th arrondissement of Paris), around 1950
- Choir windows in the church of Varinfroy (Oise), 1954
- Stained glass window in the church of Saint-Charles-Croix-Saint-Simon in Paris (20th arrondissement), around 1961

== Bibliography ==
- Maurice Brillant, L'Art Chrétien en France au 20th century, ses tendances nouvelles, Paris, Bloud & Gay, 1926, 375 p. pl. (p. 69-70, 227, 229, 250, 295, 335, pl. XVIII).
- Le Matin, 20 novembre 1932, « La Renaissance du vitrail ».
- Madeleine Bunoust, Quelques femmes peintres, 36 planches, Paris, Stock, 1936, (p. 120-121).
- Comedia, 2 octobre 1943.
- L’Écho Illustré, Genève, 27 décembre 1952.
- L'Alsace, 21 novembre 1964, p. 4.
- Le Courrier Picard, 25 décembre 1975.
- Salon d'Automne, catalogue 1990.
- Caritas, Union Française des Anciennes élèves du Sacré Cœur, No. 1, mars 1991.
- Florence Ledoux, Catalogue Sommaire de l'œuvre de Pauline Peugniez, mémoire de maîtrise, sous la direction de Bruno Foucart, Université de Paris IV, Paris-Sorbonne, 1995.
- Micheline Tissot-Gaucher, L'Église du Saint-Esprit et les quelque 70 artistes qui l'ont décorée, Le Mée-sur-Seine, Amatteis, 2005.
