= Musée Sainte-Croix =

Coordinates: 46.5792°N 0.3477°E

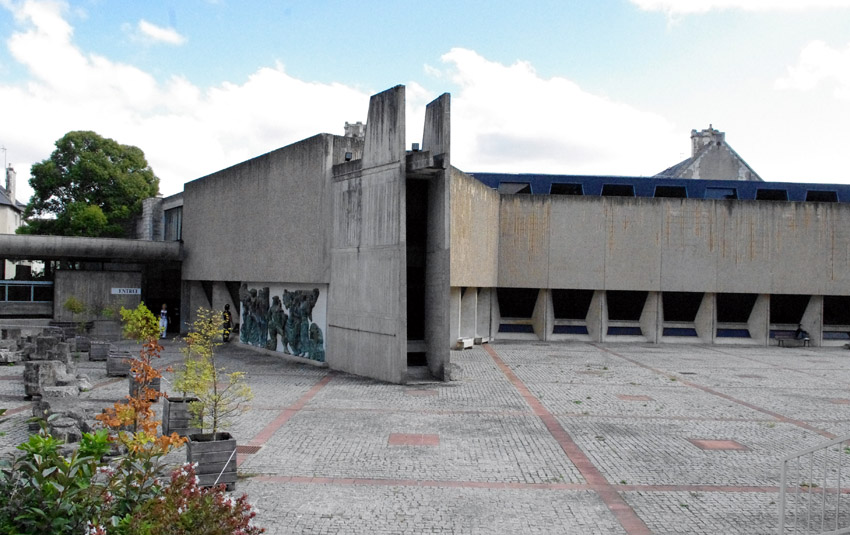
Entrance to the museum

The Musée Sainte-Croix is the largest museum in Poitiers, France. Planned by the architect poitevin Jean Monge and built in 1974, it stands at the site of the former Abbaye Sainte-Croix, which was moved to Saint-Benoît, Vienne. It is a constructed of concrete and glass, in the 1970s style.

The museum hosts a permanent exhibition on periods from prehistory to the contemporary art, through the medieval period and the Fine arts. Major works include sculptures of Camille Claudel and Auguste Rodin, a reliquary vase from Saint-Savin-sur-Gartempe, paintings by Piet Mondrian and Odilon Redon and the stone sculpture of L'Âme de la France by Charles Marie Louis Joseph Sarrabezolles.

== History ==
The first museum of the city of Poitiers was created in 1820. It then moved to the ground floor of the new town hall built at the end of the Second Empire. In 1947, a major donation by the Société des Antiquaires de l'Ouest considerably enriched the city's collections, regional archeology and numismatics being strengthened, as well as fine and decorative arts.

The architect Jean Monge, winner of the Prix de l'Équerre d'Argent for the city's university library of law and letters in 1973, was commissioned to build a new museum building. The museum opened on December 21, 1974, under the name of "Centre culturel Sainte-Croix". Since September 2015, its historical qualities of architecture have been recognized by the label "Heritage of the 20th century" awarded by the Ministry of Culture.

By 2019, the museum will have modern outsourced reserves in Vouneuil-sous-Biard, bringing together some 1.2 million objects listed in the museum's inventory, and thus freeing up more than 1,000 m2 of storage space exhibition inside the building. The permanent route will then be greatly enriched, among other things by the arrival of collections from the other municipal museum, the Rupert-de-Chièvres Museum, which has been closed since 2009. A three-year partnership between the City and Institut national du patrimoine also provides for scientific, technical and professional cooperation in the fields of heritage conservation and restoration.

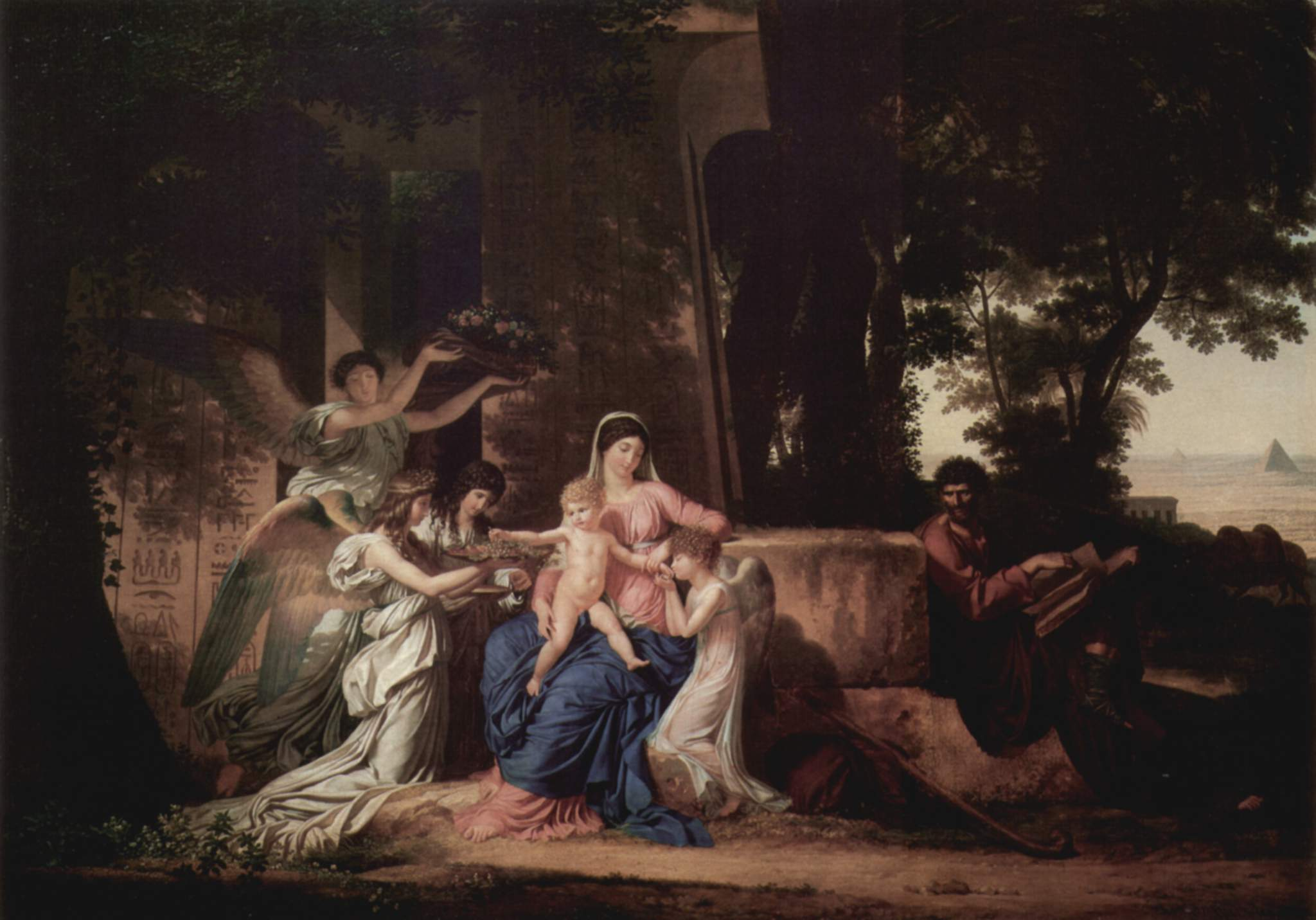
Le Repos de la Sainte Famille pendant la fuite en Égypte, Louis Gauffier, 1792.

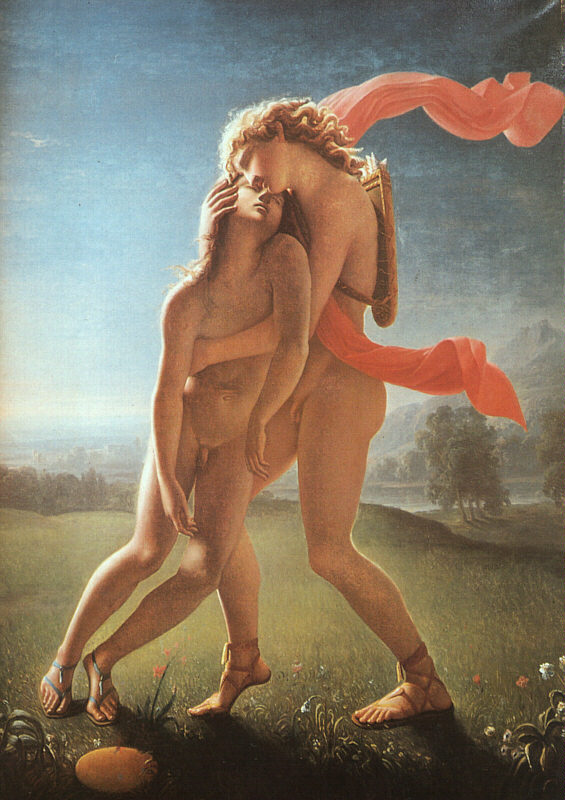
La Mort de Hyacinthe, Jean Broc, 1801.

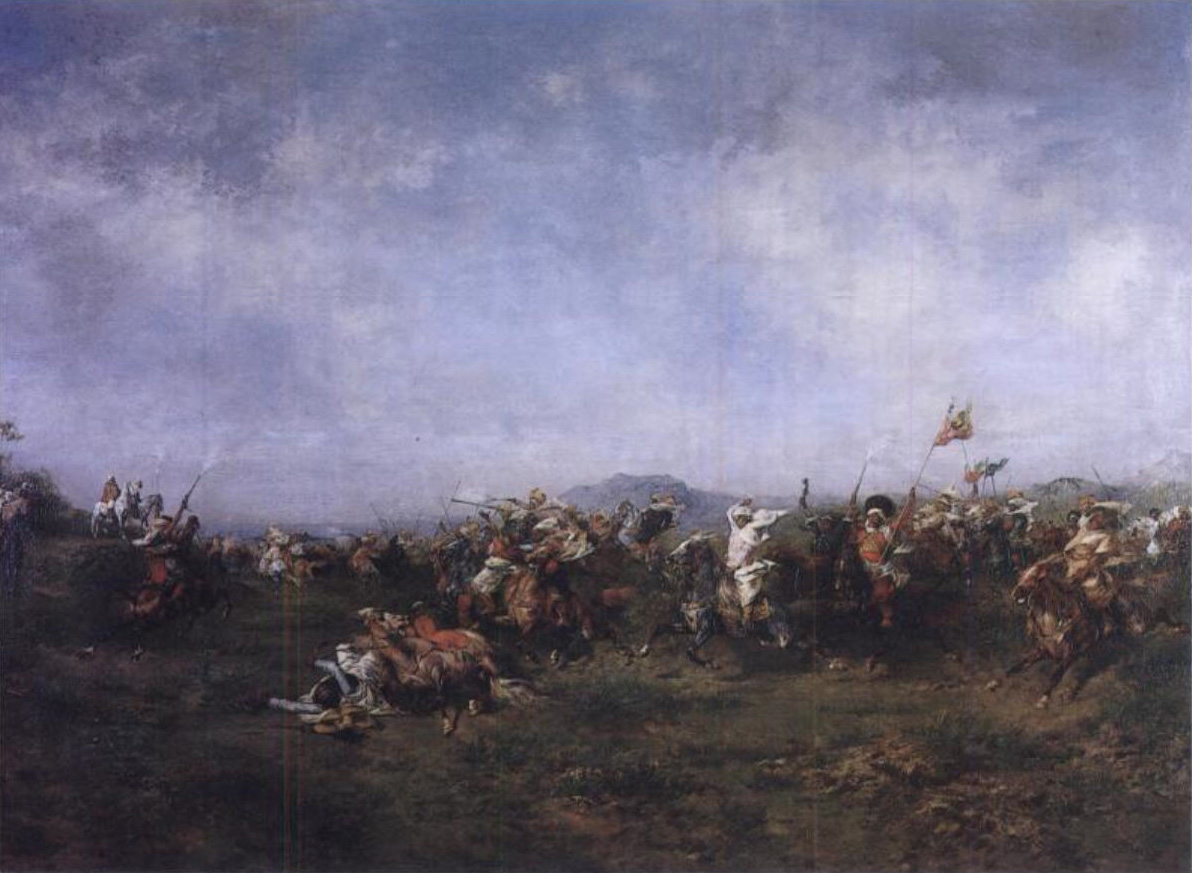
Eugène Fromentin, Une Fantasia (Maghreb), Algérie, 1869

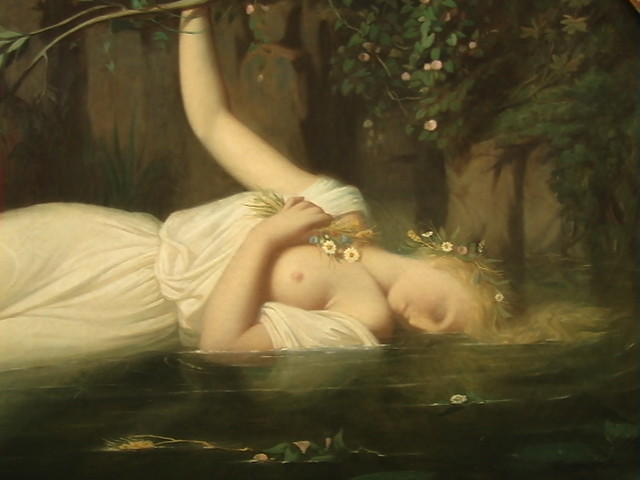
Ophélie, Léopold Burthe, (detail) 1851.
