= Marion Tournon-Branly =

French architect

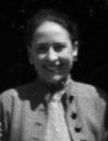
- Born: Marie Tournon; 23 September 1924; Paris, France
- Died: 15 May 2016 (aged 91); Paris, France
- Occupation: Architect
- Awards: member of the Académie d'architecture
- Buildings: buildings for the Fleury Abbey, schools in Paris and Manosque, church of the Fontenelle Abbey

Marion Tournon-Branly (23 September 1924 – 15 May 2016) was a French architect. She was born in Paris to architect Paul Tournon and painter Élisabeth Branly (daughter of Edouard Branly). After studying at the École nationale supérieure des Beaux-Arts, she collaborated with her father and with Auguste Perret.

She designed villas, elementary schools, buildings for the Fleury Abbey and the modern church of the Fontenelle Abbey.
