= L'Âme de la France =

Sculpture by Carlo Sarrabezolles

L'Âme de la France ("The Soul of France")
- France
- For World War I
- Location: 21.064667°S 55.521667°E
- Designed by: Charles Sarrabezolles
- "the victory of a France grateful to her dead"

L'Âme de la France ("The Soul of France") is the name given by the French sculptor Carlo Sarrabezolles to three identical monumental statues that he executed in three different materials during the interwar period, the first in plaster in 1921, the second in stone in 1922, and the last in bronze in 1930. 3.2 metres tall, they represent a female warrior with naked breasts raising her arms toward the sky.

== Overview ==
Executed from the first of the three models, the newest sculpture is currently located on a pedestal at the entrance to Hell-Bourg on the Heights of the island of Réunion, an overseas département of France in the Indian Ocean. It was presented by the deputy Lucien Gasparin to the commune of Salazie in 1931 and since then has gone through island history in unusual fashion.

At first erected in the little village centre before the town hall, it was quickly dynamited off its pedestal by the priest, then successively kept in pieces behind a hair salon, repaired by welding, and at last moved several kilometres to the place where it still stands. There, it was once again torn off its pedestal by a tropical cyclone, then abandoned, face down on the ground, for twenty years before finally being found by chance during construction work in 1968. It was then put back in place, rehabilitated as a memorial to World War I dead, celebrated in magnificent public ceremonies, registered in the general inventory of historic monuments, and finally classified as such in 2004.

== Technical and symbolic characteristics ==
Like the two other examples, in plaster and stone, L'Âme de la France in bronze is a statue 3.20 m high. It depicts a helmeted female warrior stretching her two arms toward the sky, her right hand ending in a delicate little spray of flowers and, by contrast, her left fist forcefully gripping a shield slipped onto her forearm.

This singular V-shaped pose is not random. According to Le Quotidien de La Réunion, "this woman symbolises 'the victory of a France grateful to her dead'", in this case the soldiers who fell during World War I, in which the people of Réunion participated, notably led by the aviator Roland Garros. Thus, the figure visually depicts the country's gratitude toward the poilus through what the Mérimée Database of historic monuments called a "secular allegory", and the statue can thus be used as a war memorial, as is the case on Réunion.

Nevertheless, the subject of L'Âme de la France has its own individual characteristics that contrast strongly with its martial attributes. First, she was "lovingly fashioned down to the smallest details, from the folds of her dress to her splendid braids", two long pigtails that "slide down her back". In addition and even more importantly, she represents a young half-nude woman, her belly and her breasts bared "to the open air", the slender body and the head turned to the right in a position that is ultimately very sensual.

== Origins ==
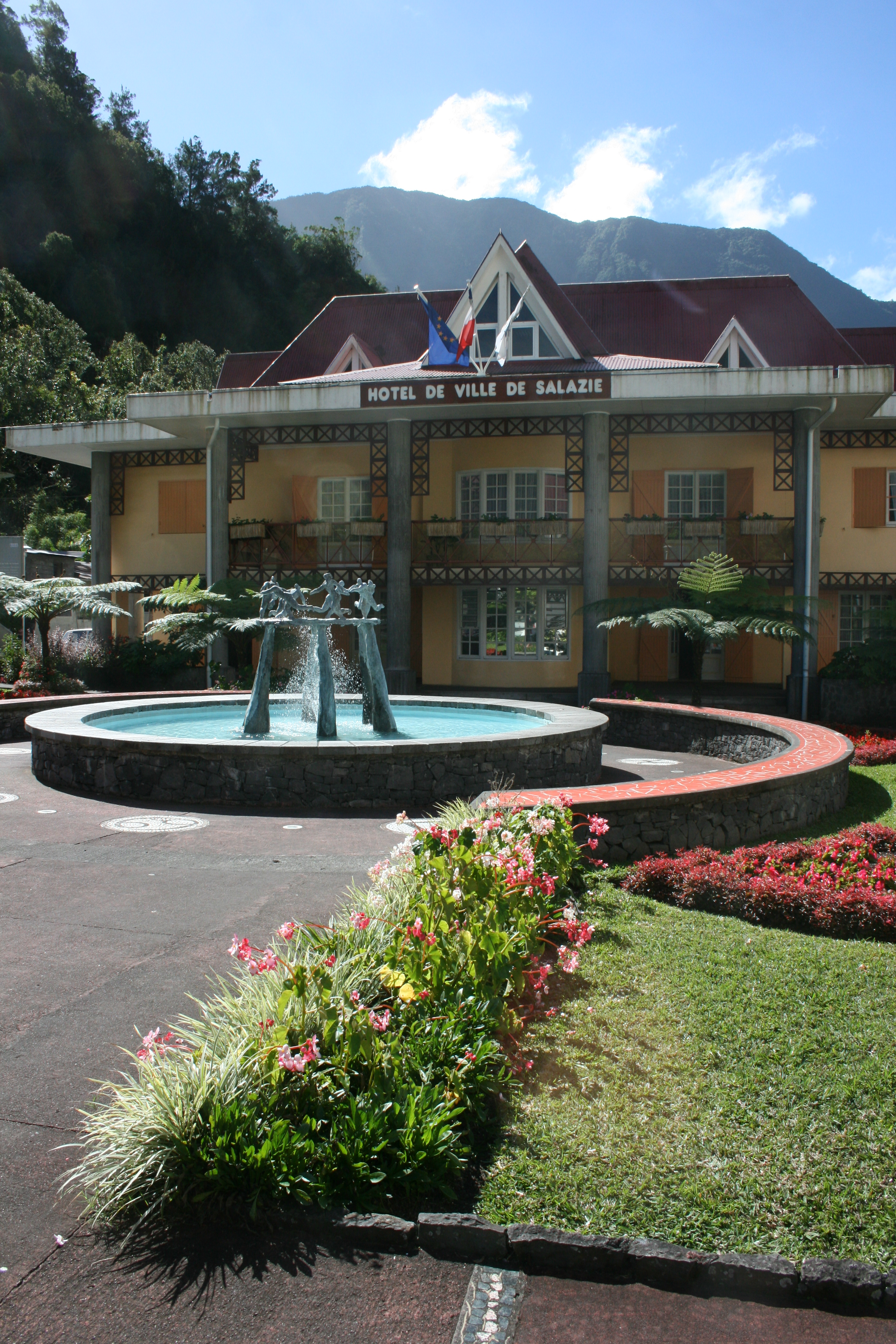
The town hall in front of which the bronze L'Âme de la France was placed after its arrival on Réunion.

L'Âme de la France is the work of Charles Sarrabezolles, often called Carlo Sarrabezolles. It was the first monumental work of this French sculptor born in Toulouse on 27 December 1888 and who attended that city's école des Beaux-Arts from 1904 to 1907, and its Parisian counterpart until 1914. In that year he was mobilised for service in World War I, in which he fought and was taken captive. Thus until 1918 he was unable to practice his art due to the conflict that would inspire his statues.

In 1921, he made a first model in plaster, now stored in the Historial de la Grande Guerre in Péronne, Somme, which won the silver medal at the Salon des Artistes Français. That year, he also made at least one 55 cm miniature in green polished bronze and gold, now found in a private collection. The following year, he created a copy in monumental stone, earning him the national prize; he donated this sculpture to the Musée du Luxembourg in Paris but it is now stored at the Musée Sainte-Croix in Poitiers. Finally, in 1930 he cast the bronze sculpture now found in Hell-Bourg, Réunion.

This last sculpture ended up in Réunion only due to the intervention of a leading political figure, Lucien Gasparin, who was literally "the incarnation of Réunion in the National Assembly from 1906 to 1942": it was this deputy, born in 1868, who signed the public order at a cost of thirty million francs on 11 July 1931. Soon after, in the little village centre of Salazie, a commune on the Heights of the island situated in the eponymous cirque, the statue was placed in front of the town hall.

== Setup of the bronze statue on Réunion and wrecking ==
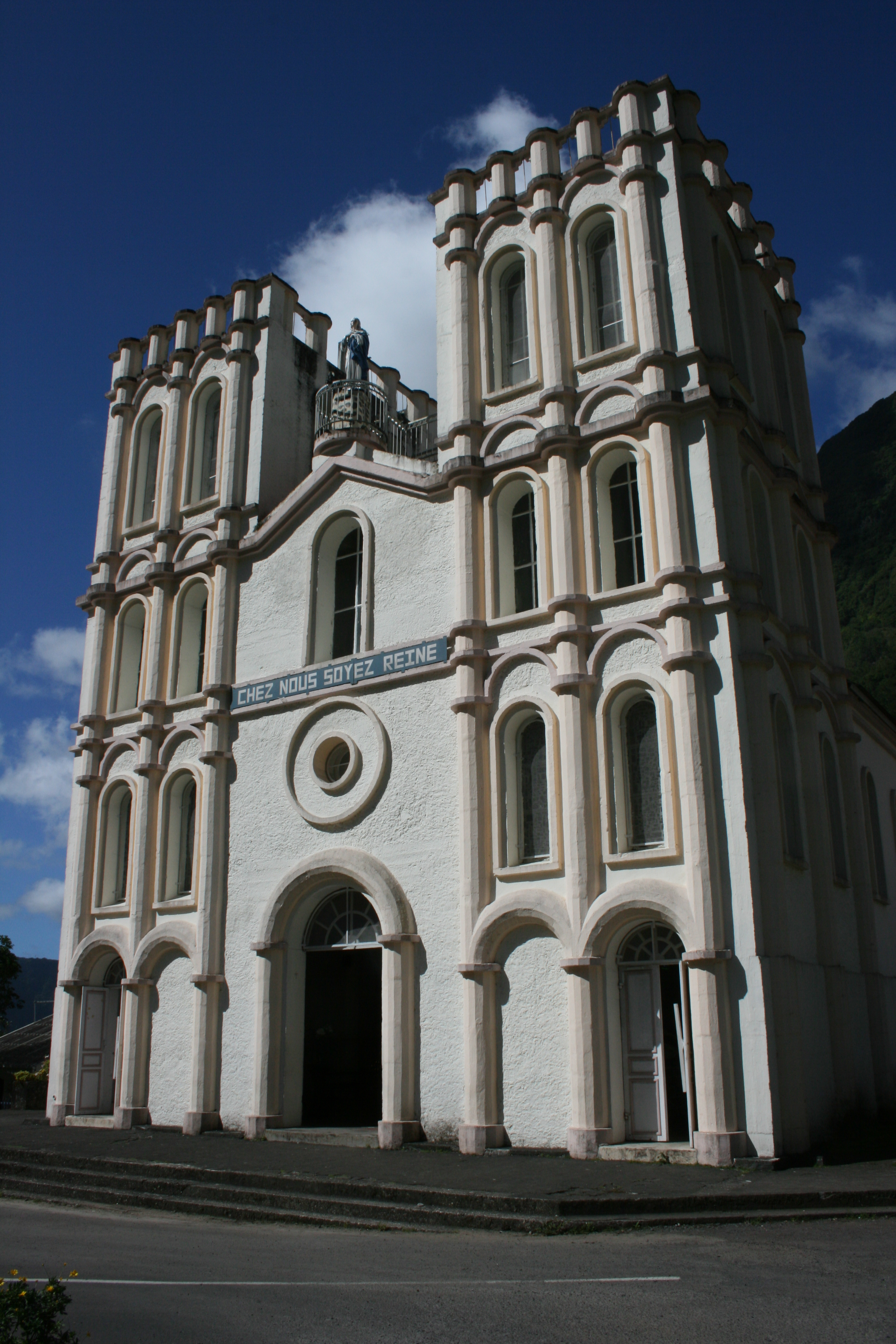
The church before which the bronze L'Âme de la France stood at the beginning of the 1930s.

The bronze statue's placement before Salazie town hall also situated it right in front of the nearby church, pastored by a conservative young priest born in 1902, Father Gabriel Bourasseau. Having been active in Young Christian Workers, he passed through the novitiate in Orly and on Madagascar, whence he was sent to Réunion at the end of two years. He had already worked as a vicar at Champ-Borne and on the Plaine des Cafres before arriving at Salazie, where he rebuilt the old wooden church into an enlarged stone parish church.

Describing the monument to the dead as "shocking", the priest began to mobilise the faithful in favour of its destruction, and launched "a politico-religious battle" nevertheless attributed by some to a maneuver taken up by Lucien Gasparin, a profoundly anti-clerical descendant of affranchi freed slaves. In an attempt to defuse the situation, inhabitants proposed covering the statue's naked breasts with clothing, but mayor Didier Fontaine rejected this solution.

However, several years later, the Third Republic fell to Nazi Germany during the Second World War, and Father Bourasseau took advantage of the change in political regime to obtain from Vichy the right to take down the statue. A first attempt involving parishioners pulling the statue with ropes failed to take it down. They finally resorted to dynamite which succeeded in bringing it down, breaking its arms in the process. The debris was kept in a hangar behind a hairdresser's shop in Salazie.

== Removal and fall into oblivion ==
The upheavals of the Second World War and the conversion of Réunion into a département saw the return to favour of the bronze L’Âme de la France; as a result, its arms were welded back on. However, it was moved out of Salazie centre toward Hell-Bourg, at the entrance of which it was set up and is still found today, in a little garden decorated with several fanjans (tree ferns). It was placed facing a large kiosk and the town hall annex of the period, which has since been dismantled and rebuilt behind the statue.

The young woman's back precisely faces the cliff that separates the cirque from the plateau that opens onto the Bélouve Forest, which dramatizes its placement, served by a high pedestal and a cast-iron décor. Moreover, today it faces a commemorative plaque dedicated to the poet Auguste Lacaussade situated on the other side of the lane that passes through Hell-Bourg and thus sits at the heart of a space devoted to public representation and commemoration.

Although this new site allowed the controversy to die down, the statue was not well-sheltered. Soon after its relocation, it was ripped off its pedestal by a devastating tropical cyclone known locally as the cyclone of 1948. Thrown to the ground a second time, it lay abandoned, face-down, for twenty years until the place was refurbished: in 1968, communal workers rediscovered it intact under grasses and construction debris.

== Rehabilitation and listing ==
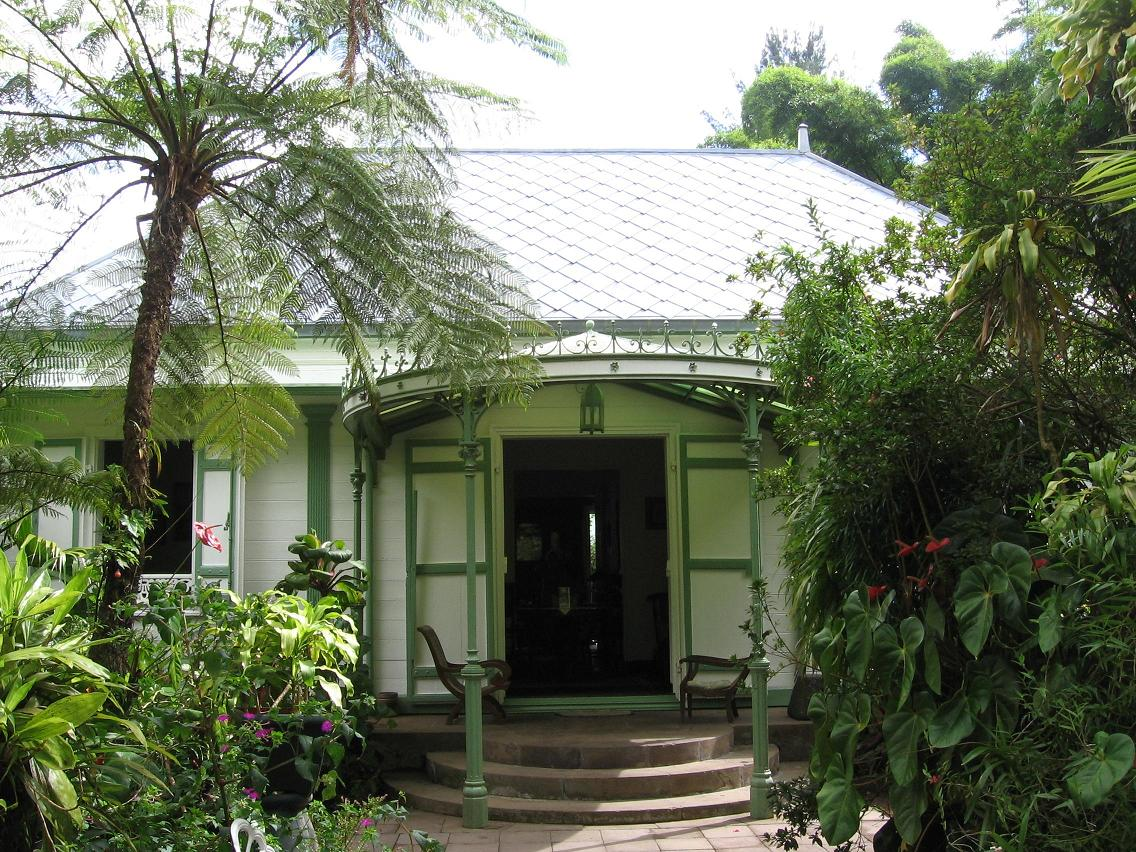
The maison Folio, another site classified by the Monuments historiques, located on the same road as L'Âme de la France in bronze.

Upright once more, the bronze L’Âme de la France was rehabilitated as a war memorial and thus survived its backer Gasparin (d. 1948), its detractor Fr. Bourasseau (d. 1957) and its creator Sarrabezolles, who died in 1967 not without having executed other statues with their arms raised, such as Le Génie de la mer in 1935. The parishioners appropriated the sculpture for themselves by assimilating the female personage it depicts with Joan of Arc, the patron saint of France, and on 14 July 1974, according to Le Quotidien de La Réunion, "Hell-Bourg finally rendered it a homage worthy of this name, with flowers, trumpets, joy and serenity".

The bronze L’Âme de la France and its pedestal were inscribed on the general list of Monuments historiques on 22 October 1998 by arrêté (administrative act). Then, on 5 May 2004, the war monument ensemble was classified, again by arrêté. This national recognition has helped promote the image of Hell-Bourg as a picturesque village of great interest to the cultural heritage, a view supported by the nearby presence of buildings such as the Maison Folio, likewise classified.

As of 2007, the statue is an object of particular attention for one of the heads of the Salazie ecomuseum, Marc Pesseau, "its lover and above all the guardian of its history". According to him, several shadowy areas remain to be filled in the statue's history, but he is passionate in his research. Moreover, he notes that the institution over which he presides is working to renovate the pedestal, funds for which the French state must eventually decide to appropriate through the Direction régionale des Affaires culturelles.
