= Notre-Dame-des-Missions-du-cygne d'Enghien =

Church in Épinay-sur-Seine, France

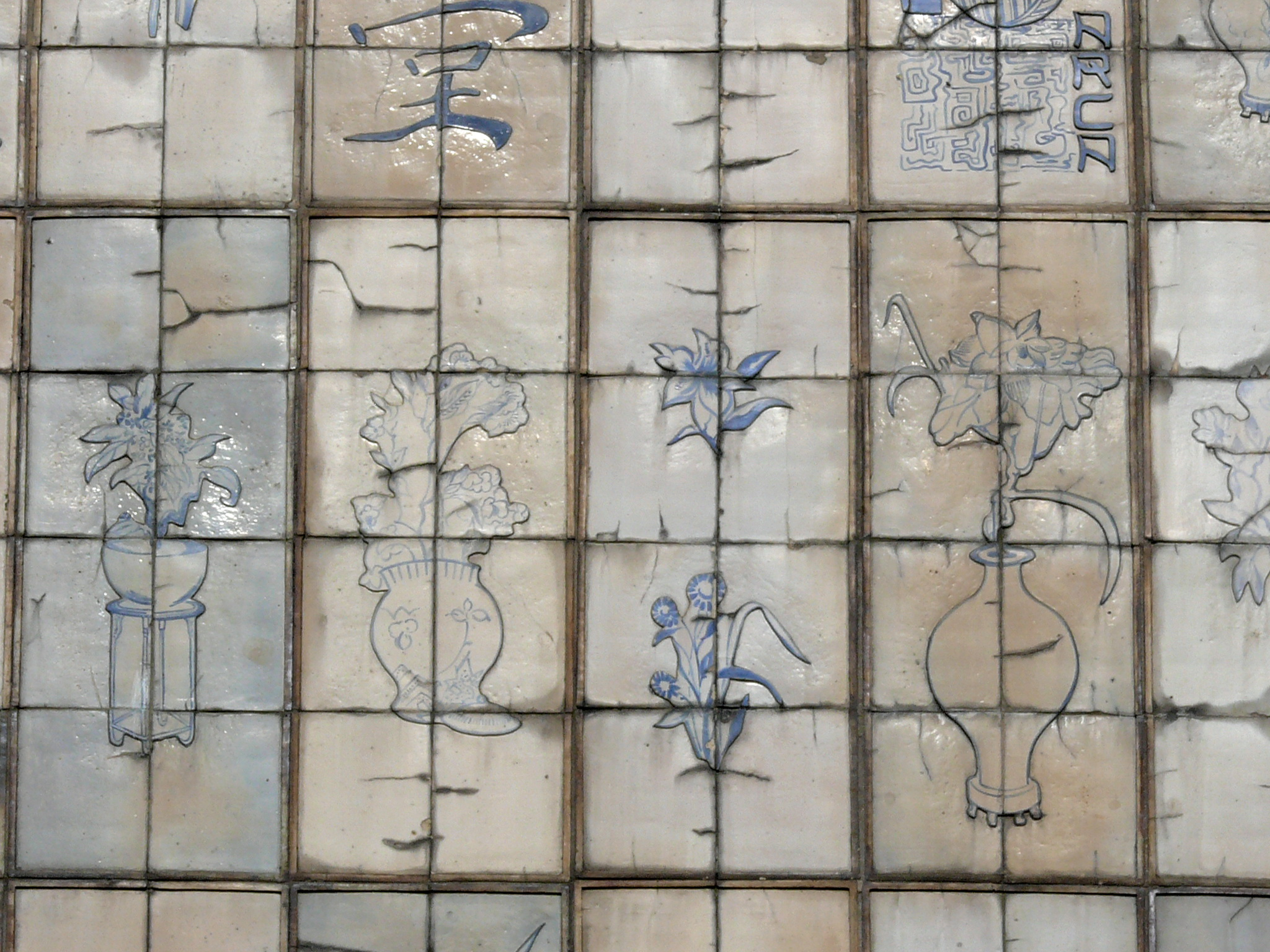
- Façade, 2007

Religion
- Affiliation: Roman Catholic

Location
- Location: Épinay-sur-Seine, Seine-Saint-Denis
- Interactive map of Notre-Dame-des-Missions-du-cygne d'Enghien
- Coordinates: 48°57′39″N 2°17′51″E

Architecture
- Architect: Paul Tournon
- Type: church
- Style: modern
- Groundbreaking: 1932
- Completed: 1932

Notre-Dame-des-Missions-du-cygne d'Enghien (sometimes referred to as Notre-Dame-des-Missions d'Épinay-sur-Seine) is a French Roman Catholic church located in the commune of Épinay-sur-Seine, near Paris and in the Seine-Saint-Denis department. Designed by Paul Tournon, decorated by many major artists of the day, and consecrated in 1932, the church is considered one of the most significant examples of modern ecclesiastical design in France.

== History ==
Beginning in 1925, the Catholic Church initiated a program called the Chantiers du Cardinal, through which it would build churches in undesirable areas and Christianize the red-light districts around Paris. Most of these churches were built of cement and brick. In 1930, Cardinal Jean Verdier decided to take the program even further, decreeing that it would be necessary, over the next few years, to construct a hundred churches for the diocese. The success of Verdier's plan was total; in 1933 the sixtieth construction site was inaugurated, and in 1934 alone seventeen more were opened. In total, 102 churches, including Notre-Dame-des-Missions, were built around Paris before 1940, when the program finished.

The construction of the church was an outgrowth of an exhibit which had been put together for a 1931 colonial exhibition in the Bois de Vincennes. The vault of the structure was constructed as a chapel for Catholic missions expressly for the exhibit, and was dismantled at its end. It was then reconstructed using more durable materials in 1933 in Épinay-sur-Seine; funds for the building's construction were raised through a national subscription spearheaded by Marshal Hubert Lyautey. The church received its unusual double name from its origins and from the site of its construction; as the colonial exhibition was designed to glorify the evangelization of French colonies by missionaries, it was decided to dedicate the structure to Our Lady of the Missions. The rest of the name refers to the northwestern district of Épinay-sur-Seine, the so-called "Swan of Enghien", in which the church was built. The land upon which it sits was donated by Firmin-Dodot.

== Design ==
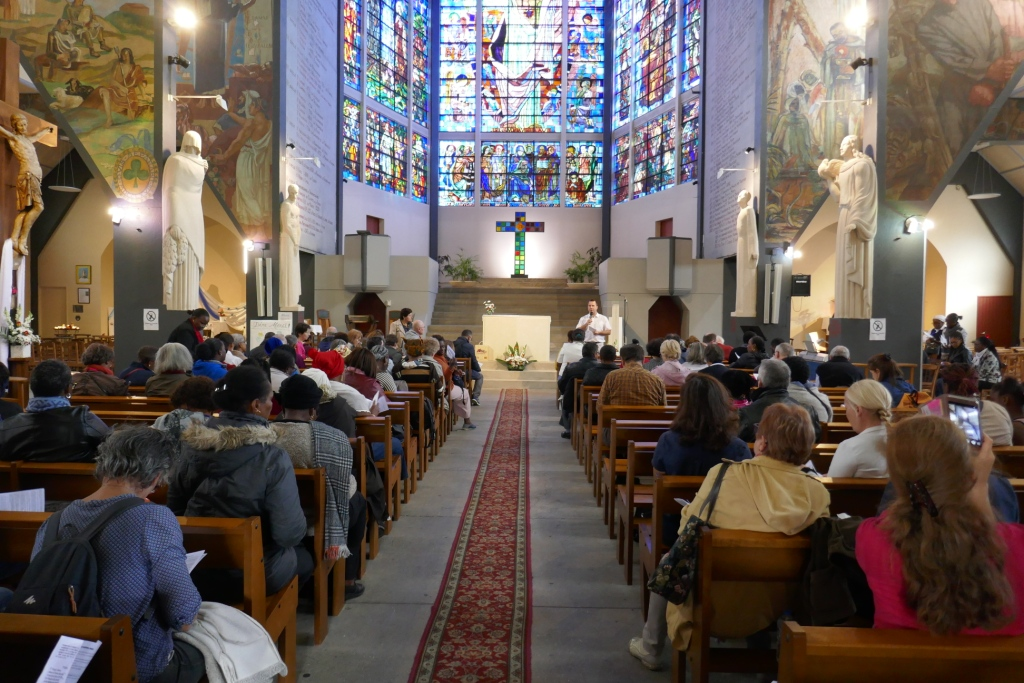

The architecture of the church is meant to recall the civilizations that were served by the Christian missions; the building is distinguished from many contemporary works through its use of reinforced concrete. Its architect, Paul Tournon, had already designed another church in the vicinity, that of Saint-Louis in Villemomble. At Notre-Dame-des-Missions, Tournon took his inspiration from the architecture of five continents. The façade of the church is designed with three roofs at the entrance, superimposed one upon another in the Chinese style and decorated with Chinese ideographs. To these are added recumbent angels, Buddhist figures, fetishistic objects, and African-inspired designs. The bell tower is designed in the shape of a minaret. The whole facade is covered in blue and white ceramic tile in a pattern created by Lorymi and Raymond Virac, using a new type of brickwork developed in 1930 by Marguerite Huré. The cement sculptures on the bell tower, depicting the four human races, were sculpted by Carlos Sarrabezolles, who had previously worked with Tournon on the bell tower at Saint-Louis. At the top of the tower is a statue of the Virgin Mary standing on a globe; it is the work of Roger de Villiers.

Many painters, sculptors and glassworkers participated in the decoration of the inside of the church; most of these artists came from the studios of sacred art founded by Maurice Denis, who had designed the windows for Notre-Dame du Raincy, and of George Desvallières. It was important that as a group the artists achieved unity of style, and the results of their collaboration comprise one of the most outstanding examples of French ecclesiastical decoration of the 1930s. Louis Barillet and his studio realized the design of some of the stained glass windows, which depict important figures in the history of evangelization. These are grouped around a figure of Christ as Missionary designed by Jean Hébert-Stevens. Among the other notable artists to work on the stained glass in the church were André Rinuy, Marguerite Huré, and Pauline Peugniez.

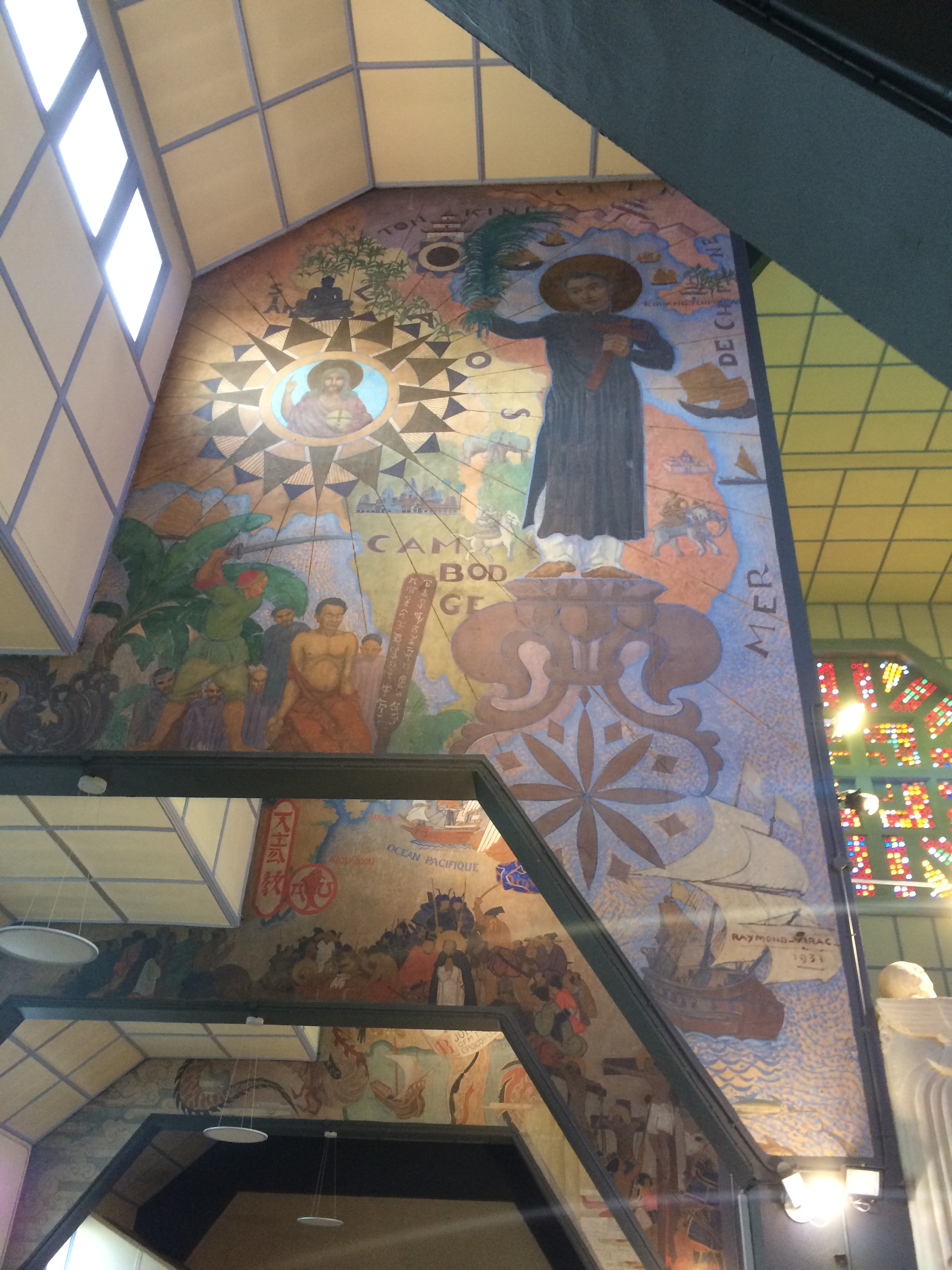

Important painters were engaged to create the frescos for the church. Chief among these was Henri de Maistre, who illustrated the Christianization of the world after the Resurrection in a series of paintings crafted for the building's side chapels. He chose to depict various French martyrs in his design, placing them against a map showing the great lakes and important cities of Canada. A panel showing the Christianization of southern Algeria and of the Sahara Desert by Charles de Foucauld was created for the interior by Georges Desvallières. A series of murals, on the right side of the church building, was painted by Raymond Virac, Lucien Simon, and Robert-Albert Génicot; these celebrate the evangelical work done in Indochina and India by Francis Xavier and that done in Japan by Alphonsus Navarette. Charles Plessard and Pauline Peugniez contributed work inspired by the Irish missions of Columba. On the left-hand side of the church may be found depictions of the Christianizatin of ancient Greece, ancient Rome, Gaul, England, Germany, and the Slavic world. Maurice Denis was the most famous artist to contribute to this series; he was aided by Henri-Justin Marret, Valentine Reyre, Paul de Laboulaye, and Georges Ballot. Eight colossal stone sculptures, which lean against the partition walls of the vaults of the church and which depict the Eight Blessings of Saint Matthew, are the work of Raymond Delamarre, a sculptor known for his work in large forms, and of Anne-Marie Roux-Colas, each of whom contributed four to the final product.

The church of Notre-Dame-des-Missions-du-Cygne d’Enghien was listed as a Historic Monument of France on June 14, 1994. As of 2007, restoration work on the structure was ongoing.

== Bibliography ==
- Marie-Louise Vinel and others, Notre-Dame des Missions, Booklet published by the church of Notre-Dame des Missions d'Épinay-sur-Seine, 2005
