= Jean Broc =

French painter (1771–1850)

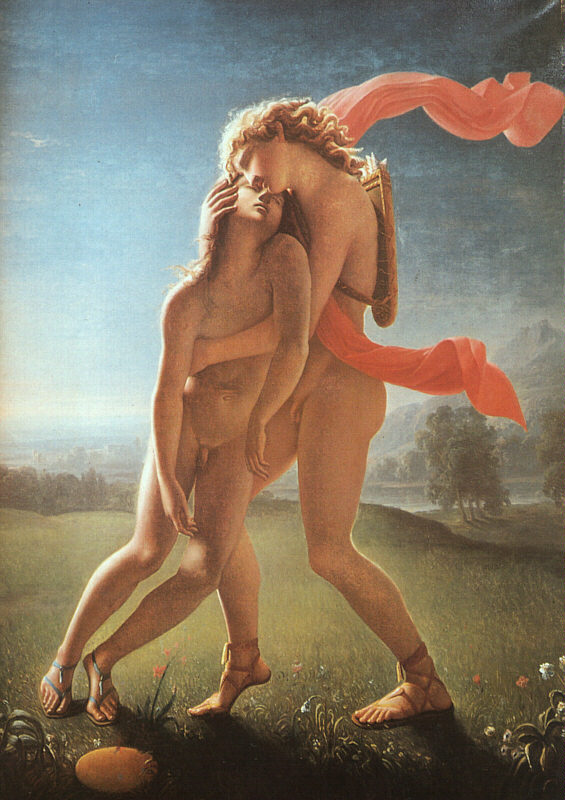
The Death of Hyacinthos, by Jean Broc. Musée Sainte-Croix, Poitiers.

Jean Broc (1771–1850) was a French neoclassical painter. His most famous work, The Death of Hyacinthos, was completed and exhibited at the Salon in 1801.

Hyacinthus was a young male beauty and lover of the god Apollo. One day, while playing with a discus, Hyacinthus was struck with the object and consequently died. The painting depicts Apollo mourning for his dead lover. Some myths link a jealous Zephyr to the incident, blaming his jealousy of Hyacinthus for a gust of wind resulting in the youth's death.

Broc studied under Jacques-Louis David and is well known for the cultivation of the intellectual group known as Les Primitifs (a.k.a., Barbus or "The Bearded Ones").

== Gallery ==
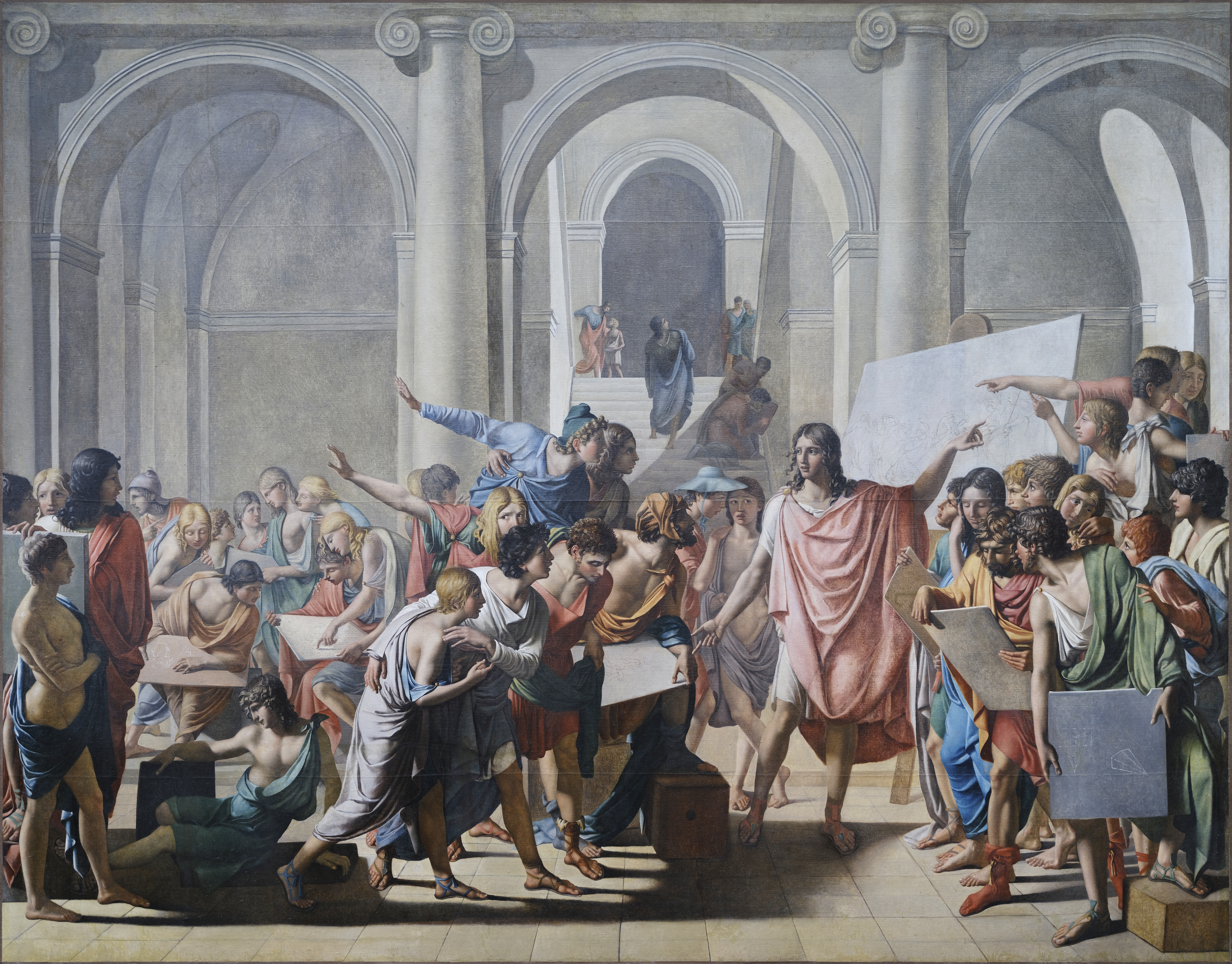
L'École d'Apelle, 1800

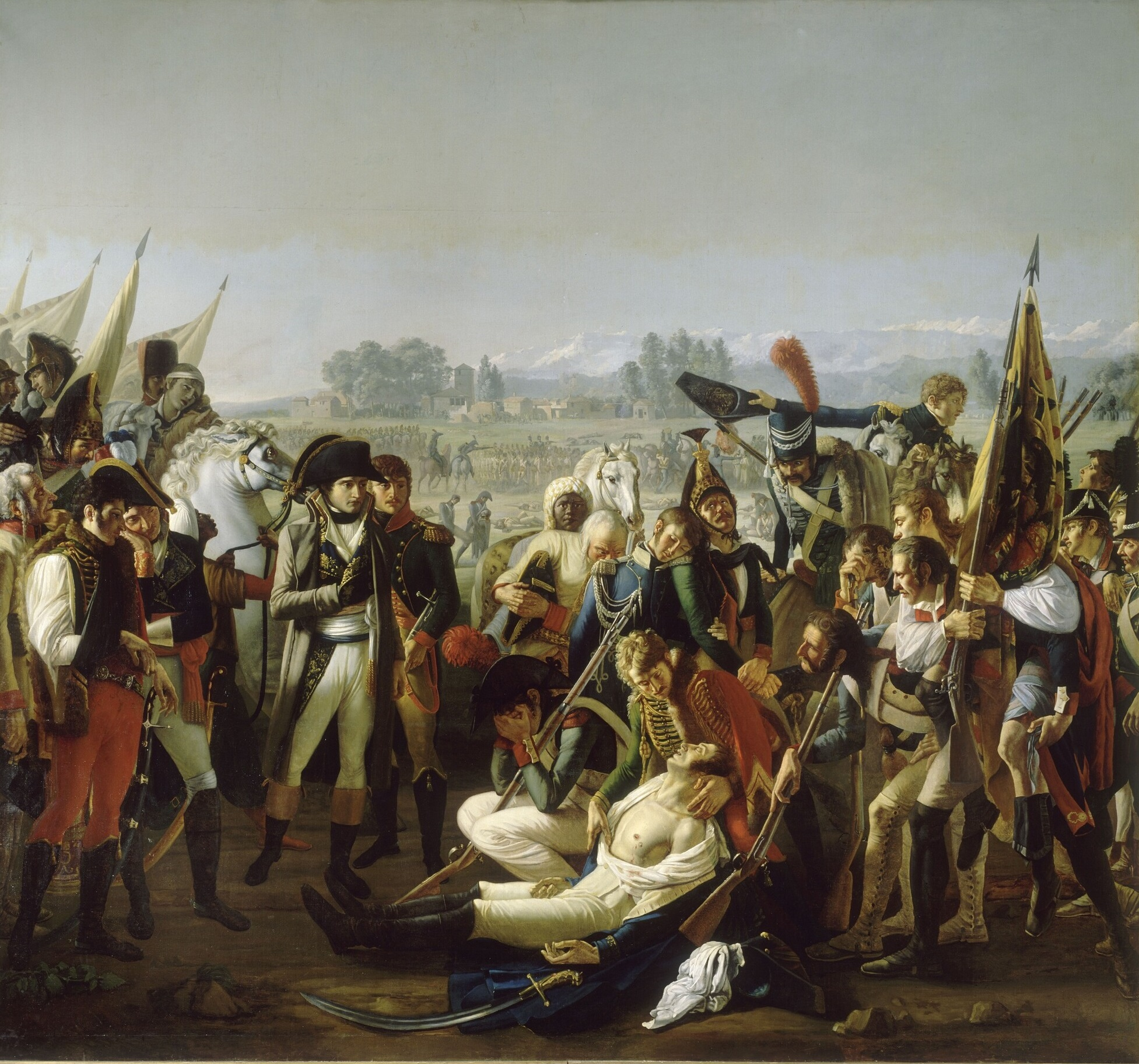
The Death of General Desaix, 1806
