= Paul Tournon =

French architect

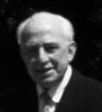
- Born: Paul Antoine Alphonse Alexandre Tournon; 19 February 1881; Marseille, France
- Died: 22 December 1964 (aged 83); 5th arrondissement of Paris, France
- Education: Beaux-Arts de Paris
- Occupation: Architect
- Spouse: Élisabeth Branly-Tournon
- Children: Florence Tournon-Branly and Marion Tournon-Branly
- Awards: Second Prix de Rome (1911), Member of the Académie des Beaux-Arts (1942), Commander of the Legion of Honour
- Projects: Casablanca Cathedral, Église du Saint-Esprit in Paris, Notre-Dame-des-Missions in Épinay-sur-Seine, Banque de France throughout France

Paul Tournon (b. 19 February 1881 – 22 December 1964) was a French architect. He was born in Marseille and died in Paris.

He was an architect in chief of many French civil buildings and national palaces, and a member of the Académie des Beaux-Arts.

== Biography ==
He entered the Beaux-Arts de Paris in 1902 under the tutelage of Louis Henri Georges Scellier de Gisors in his studio, graduating with the second Grand Prix de Rome in 1911. He completed his architect's diploma in 1912. He founded his own firm in 1914 and took part in competitions in designing several war memorials after the war. As a young architect, he was commissioned to rebuild the town of Compiègne. He continued to take part in several exhibitions in the 1920s and 1930s.

Tournon became famous for the design and construction of many religious buildings in France and Morocco using reinforced concrete, including the Église Sainte-Thérèse-de-l'Enfant-Jésus in Élisabethville (Yvelines), the Église du Saint-Esprit in Paris, and the Cathédrale du Sacré-Cœur in Casablanca. He often collaborated with sculptor Carlo Sarrabezolles, featuring his extensive sculptural work in his buildings. He also collabored with various artists involved in the revival of religious art: glassmakers Marguerite Huré, Louis Barillet, Jacques Le Chevallier, ironworker Raymond Subes, painters Marcel Imbs and Maurice Denis.

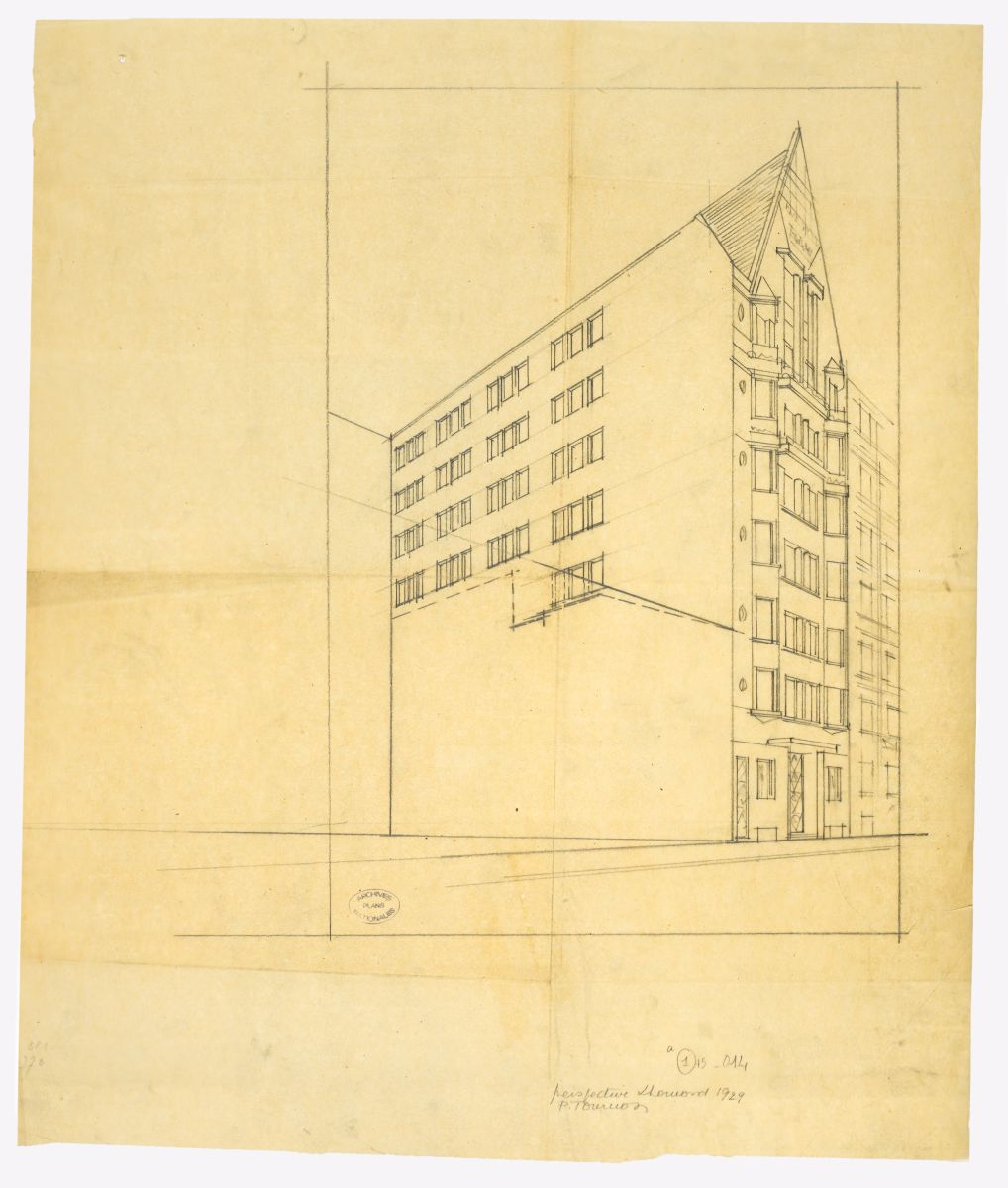
Rue Lhomond residence, perspective view of façade and gable wall, Archives nationales, 377 AP 236.

He took on a considerable number of public commissions during his career. He was appointed architect for the Banque de France in 1940, and architect of civil buildings and national palaces for several monuments. He began teaching at the École nationale supérieure des beaux-arts in 1925, becoming its director in 1942, as well as the director of École nationale supérieure des arts décoratifs. He was elected President of the Société Centrale des Architectes from 1945 to 1948.

In 1942, he was elected to the Académie des Beaux-Arts in Gustave Umbdenstock's place.

As an experienced architect, he had several students including Georges-Henri Pingusson and André Remondet.

== Key Achievements ==
Years	Building
1919–1922	War memorials, Tournon-sur-Rhône and Rambouillet
1923–1926	Bell tower of Saint-Louis church in Villemomble (now Seine-Saint-Denis)
1925	Architects' pavilion and Provence pavilion at the International Exhibition of Modern Decorative and Industrial Arts
1926–1928	Église du Saint-Esprit, Paris
1928	Sainte-Thérèse-de-l'Enfant-Jésus church, Élisabethville (Yvelines)
1930	Notre-Dame-de-l'Océan church in Rabat, Morocco
1930	Student residence on Rue Lhomond in Paris
1931	Missions pavilion at the 1931 Paris Colonial Exposition, rebuilt in Épinay-sur-Seine as the Église Notre-Dame-des-Missions
1931	Saint-Pierre-Apôtre church, Alfortville (Val-de-Marne)
1931–1932	Édouard Branly laboratory, Institut Catholique de Paris, in the 6th arrondissement of Paris
1932–1959	Sacré-Coeur Cathedral, Casablanca, Morocco
1933	Saint-Joseph-de-l'Océan church, Rabat, Morocco
1934–1935	Saint-M'Hervon parish church, Ille-et-Vilaine
1935	Bodiffé sanatorium in Plemet (now Côtes-d'Armor)
1937	Pontifical pavilion at the 1937 Exposition Internationale des arts et techniques de la vie moderne in Paris
1939	Notre-Dame des Cèdres church in Ifrane, Morocco
1947	Le Colisée cinema, 8th arrondissement of Paris
1948	Banque de France buildings in Caen, Niort, Boulogne-Billancourt and Saint-Nazaire
1952	Banque de France buildings in Brest, Lens and Saint-Lô
1954	Banque de France building in Lorient
1955–1958	Maison de la Radio in Strasbourg
1958–1961	Saint-Honoré church in Amiens, Somme
1958–1965	Extension of Fleury Abbey in Saint-Benoît-sur-Loire
1958–1968	Cité Internationale des Arts, 4th arrondissement of Paris, with architects Olivier-Clément Cacoub and Ngo Viet Thu.
1959	Restoration and expansion of the Hôtel d'Aumont

== Personal life ==
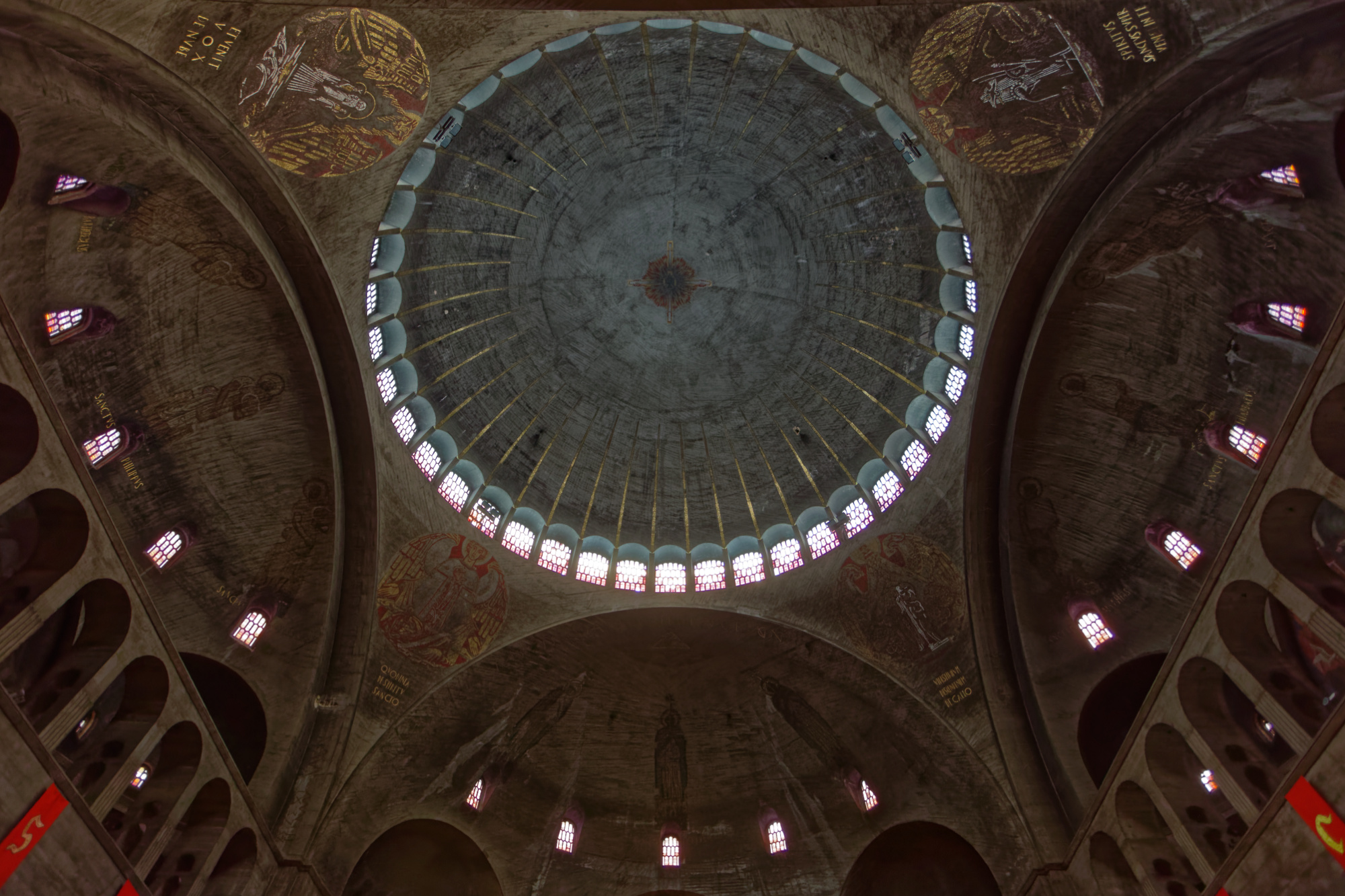
The dome of the Église du Saint-Esprit (Church of the Holy Spirit) in Paris, which Tournon designed.

Tournon was the son-in-law of Édouard Branly (1889–1972), a painter, the husband of Élisabeth Branly-Tournon, painter. He and Élisabeth had two daughters: Florence Tournon-Branly (1923–1981), a stained glass designer, and Marion Tournon-Branly (1924–2016), architect and professor at the École Nationale Supérieure des Beaux-Arts and the Fontainebleau Schools.

== Death and legacy ==
He was interred and is buried at Père Lachaise Cemetery in Paris, France. His archives and his daughter Marion's archives are kept at the Archives Nationales under the reference 377 AP3.

== Bibliography ==
- Giorgio Pigafetta et Antonella Mastrorilli, Paul Tournon architecte: Le moderniste sage, Sprimont, Mardaga, 2004, 197 p. ISBN 2-87009-842-1, lire en ligne [archive])
- Gérard Monnier (dir), L'architecture moderne en France, t. 1 1889-1940, Picard, 1997, p. 192 et 255-256
- Archives nationales, Le Don de l'architecture. Paul Tournon, Marion Tournon-Branly, Fontainebleau, 2013 (livret d'exposition)
