= The Death of Hyacinthos =

1801 painting by Jean Broc

- La mort d'Hyacinthe (French)
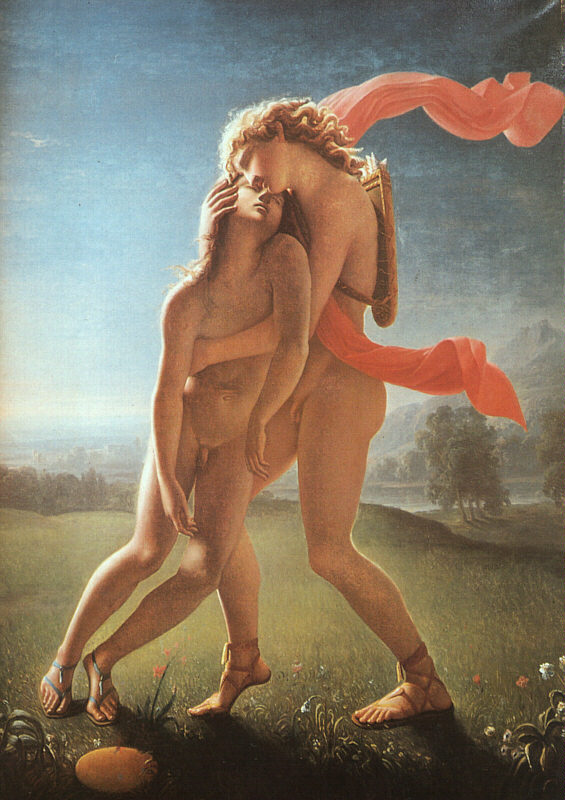
- Artist: Jean Broc
- Year: 1801
- Medium: Oil on canvas
- Location: Musée Sainte-Croix, Poitiers

The Death of Hyacinthos, sometimes referred to as The Death of Hyacinth, is an oil painting completed by Jean Broc in 1801. This is Broc's most famous work and is considered to be drawn from the Metamorphoses by Ovid. It is a depiction of the dead Hyacinthos cradled by his lover, the Greek god Apollo. In front of them is the discus which caused Hyacinth's death, which was thrown by Apollo himself. The discus had been blown off course by the west wind Zephyrus, who was also in love with young Hyacinthos and was jealous of Apollo. From Hyacinthos' blood sprang the hyacinth flower which bears his name. The painting presently belongs in the collection of Poitiers and is often displayed at the Musée Sainte-Croix.

== Description ==
The painting displays Apollo, recognizable by his red cape and lyre, cradling Hyacinth as he stumbles. Beside Apollo's feet is the discus which caused Hyacinth's death. The Zephyrus, or west wind, blows Apollo's cape. Around the figure's feet are scattered flowers. In the background is a small grouping of trees, and a body of water (either a lake or river) and a mountain.

== History ==
The Death of Hyacinthos was exhibited at the Paris Salon of 1801. It was most likely exhibited again at the Paris Salon of 1814, piece number 155, under the title "Hyacinthos wounded". Later, it was purchased by baron Horace Demarçay (1813–1866), and was donated to the museum at Poitiers by his widow in 1899. Since then, it has been exhibited in several exhibitions:

- 1974, as part of the exhibition "From David to Delacroix, French painting from 1774 to 1830", Paris-Detroit-New York, number 16, catalogue entry by Robert Rosenblum, pages 340–341;
- 1975, "Search for Innocence", University of Maryland Art Gallery;
- 1989, "The Death of Bara", Avignon, Calvet Museum;
- 1997, "Goodbye to Berlin", Berlin, Schwules Museum;
- 2002, "The Birth of Feeling, the Foundations of Romanticism", Paris, Cité de la musique, number 38, catalogue entry by Philippe Bata, 3 April to 30 June 2002;
- 2006, "American Artists in the Louvre", Paris, Musée du Louvre, 14 June – 18 September 2006.

== Influences ==
The theme of The Death of Hyacinth has been touched upon by various other artists.

- Before Broc:
  - Boizot, Salon of 1745, no. 133;
  - Benjamin West. This painting was displayed in Paris between 1794 and 1801 and Broc would have certainly seen the piece. It is currently kept at Swarthmore College in Pennsylvania.
- After Broc:
  - Blondel, no date, Gray (France), at the Musée Baron Martin;
  - Girodet, (attributed), Angoulême, at the Musée des Beaux-arts;
  - Calllamard, (sculpture), between 1812 and 1814;
  - Bosio, (sculpture), 1817, Paris, Musée du Louvre.

== Thematic analysis ==
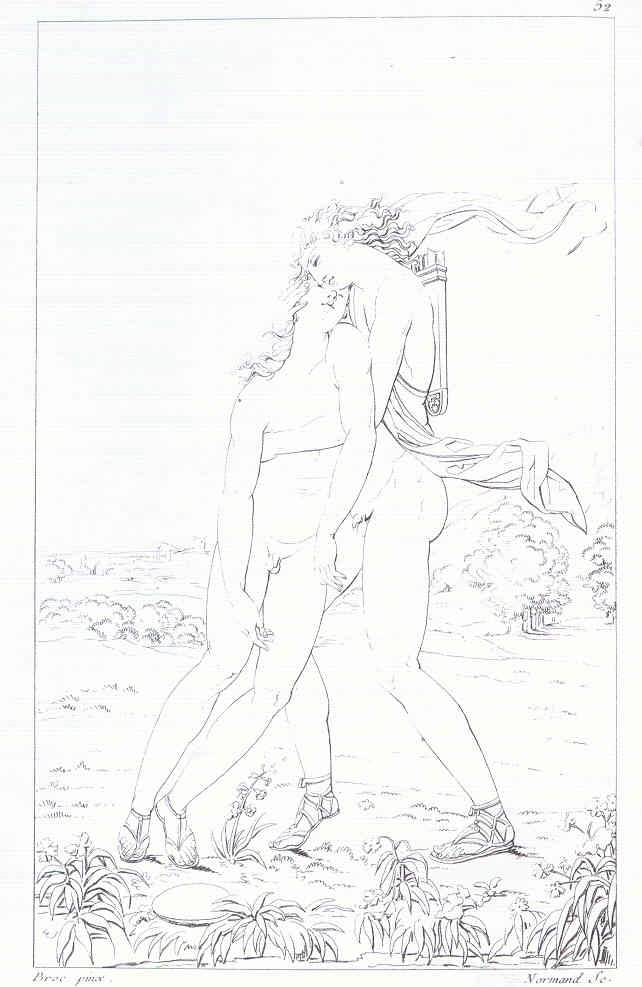
The Death of Hyacinthos Line engraving published in Les Annales du musée

Charles Paul Landon wrote the following analysis of the painting's theme for the Salon of 1802:

This theme (which has already been briefly described in volume 2, page 23, in the section regarding the plaster model by Callamard) represents the death of Hyacinthos, Apollo’s favorite, while playing discus with the god. The young man is struck with a fatal blow; he is dying in Apollo’s arms, who changes him into the flower that bears his name (see previously referenced page). Egyptian mythology, on which the Greeks probably founded their entire religious system, tells us that Apollo, son of Zeus, was gifted with extraordinary beauty, such that the sun was named after him. This prince, who was equally commendable for his spiritual qualities as for his external beauty, was the first to teach science and art to the Egyptians. He joined with Neptune to found the city of Troy, and then went to the Island of Delos where he stayed for a time before finally settling in the city of Delphi. There he had a temple and a palace built. He taught the Greeks the value of civilization. He subtly instilled in them the principals of morality through music; giving proven advice to whoever sought his counsel; predicting the different movements of the planets, the rising and setting of the moon, lunar eclipses, solar eclipses. The simple and crude folk saw their prince as an extraordinary man; Apollo took advantage of their credulity to rule them with even greater influence, and always with wisdom. Apollo’s past in Egypt is limited to the simple tale: we know from which Prodigies. The Greeks would considerably embellish it. According to the legend, Apollo is the son of Jupiter and Leto, and the brother of Artemis. His first exploit is the defeat of the snake Python. He kills the Cyclops who had forged the lightning that the master of the gods used to kill his son Asclepius. Chased from the heavens; he seeks refuge with Admetus who entrusts him with his herds. During his stay on Earth, Apollo invents the lyre, skins Marsias alive who had dared challenge him to a contest of music, and made Midas grow donkey ears for having awarded victory to Pan. Apollo, after having lost his herd to Mercury who had taken it away from him by surprise, leaves the service of Admetus, joins that of Laomedon, joins up Neptune to mold the bricks and build the walls of Troy. They received no salary for their work. Laomedon reaps the reward for his ingratitude: a terrible plague ravages his lands. Apollo tries to forget his misdeeds with mortal love. He alternately burns with desire for Daphne, Clytia, Coronis, and Cyrene. His misfortunes soften the ire of Jupiter, who brings him back to the heavens and restores his divinity and his powers. The god of poetry, music, eloquence, medicine, omens and the arts, he presides over the concerts of the Muses; at times he lives with them on Mount Parnassus, or Mount Helicon, or Mount Pieris, or on the banks of the Permesse and the Hypocrène; at times lending his charm to the gods' feasts with the gentle chords of his lyre. This painting was exhibited at the 1801 Salon and received an honorable mention from the art jury.
