= Raymond Virac =

French painter

Raymond Pierre Virac (Madrid 19 October 1892 - Tananarive, 1946) was a French painter. He studied at the Académie Julian then at the École des Beaux Arts de Paris. He spent many years in Vietnam, where he won the Prix d'Indochine in 1927, returned to Ciboure, then received the Prix de Madagascar and in 1939 moved to Madagascar to work on the town hall of Tananarive, where he died. In France his work is visible in the tiles of Notre-Dame-des-Missions-du-cygne d'Enghien and elsewhere.
