= Charles Marie Louis Joseph Sarrabezolles =

French sculptor

Charles Marie Louis Joseph Sarrabezolles (27 December 1888 – 11 February 1971), also known as Carlo Sarrabezolles (or Charles or Charles-Marie), was a French sculptor.

== Life ==
Sarrabezolles was born in Toulouse, studied at that city's École des Beaux-Arts (1904–1907), then from 1907 to 1914 at the École des Beaux-Arts in Paris, where he settled for good. In 1914 he was runner-up (premier second) in Prix de Rome competition. From 1914 to 1918, during World War I, he was held prisoner in Germany. In 1920 he married Nicole Cervi, with whom he had three children. In 1923 they moved into a studio at 16 rue des Volontaires where he remained until his death. A square there, in the 15th arrondissement of Paris, bears his name.

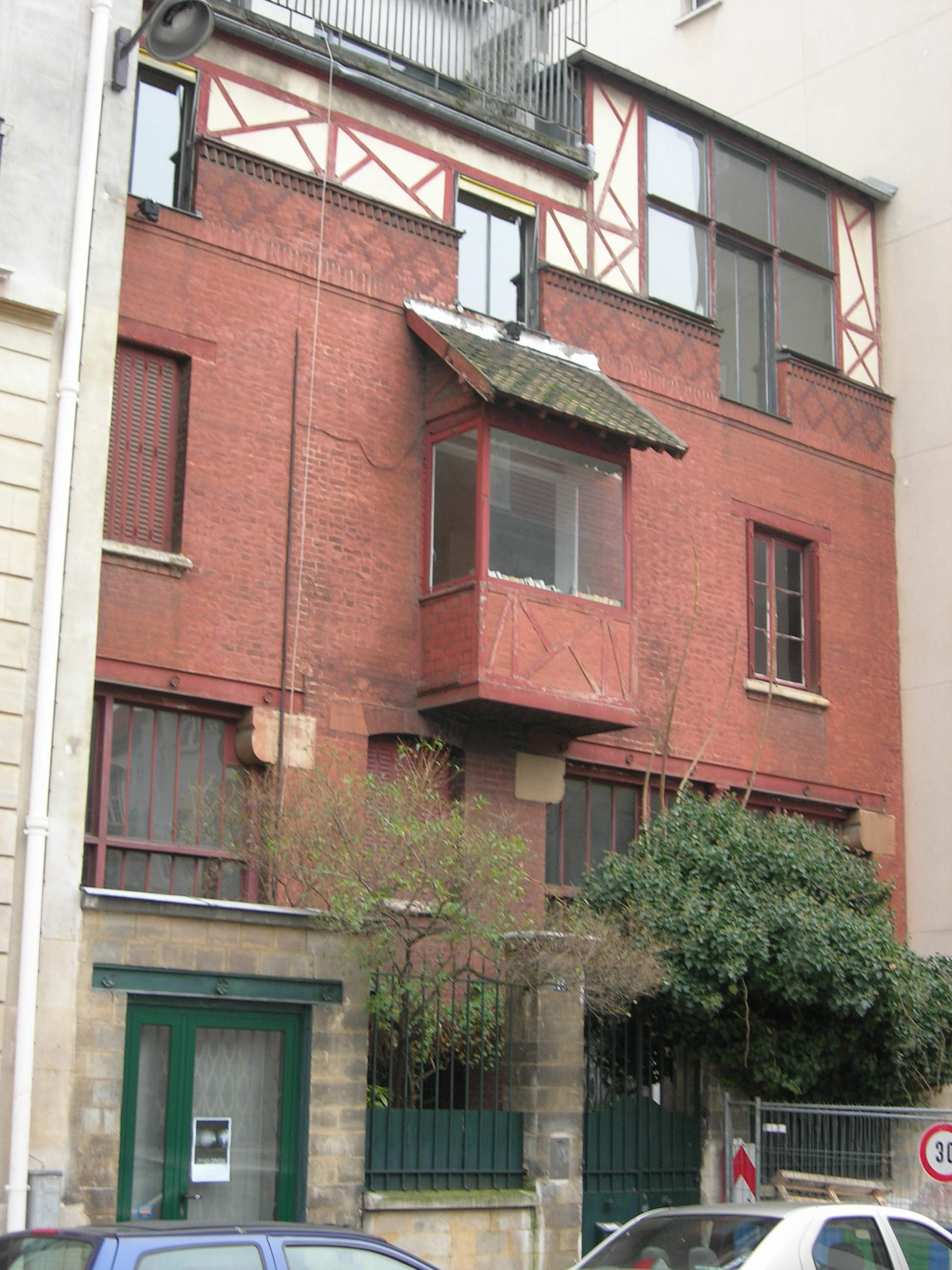
16 rue des Volontaires (Paris 15ème)

His best-known work is probably The Soul of France, which he executed in three different materials: the first in plaster in 1921, the second in stone in 1922, and the last in bronze in 1930. In 1926 the sculptor developed a method of direct carving in setting concrete, and much of his subsequent work was integrated with architecture, particularly in collaboration with architect Paul Tournon, and in monumental scale.

Sarrabezolles was a member or president of artistic associations including Art Monumental, the Salon des Artistes Français, and the Foundation Taylor.

== Selected works ==
- 1920–1922 – first monumental work, The Soul of France, winning National Prize and silver medal at the Salon
- 1925 – The Triumphal Dance of Pallas Athena and The Virgin of Peace exhibited at the Exposition Internationale des Arts Décoratifs et Industriels Modernes
- 1926 – tower, Villemomble Church (Seine-St-Denis). Invention of direct carving in setting concrete
- 1928–1929 – façade and bell tower, Elisabethville Church (Yvelines), with architect Paul Tournon
- 1928–1933 – bronze finial group Liberté - Égalité - Fraternité for the French Embassy, Belgrade, Serbia, for architect Roger-Henri Expert
- 1929 – Two Legendary Giants depicting the legendary Lydéric and Phinaert, bell tower, Lille (Nord) town hall. Also executed in direct carving of setting concrete.
- 1930 – monumental fountain, Nemours Mansion and Gardens, Wilmington, Delaware, USA.
- 1930 – Marcella Miller du Pont, portrait bust in marble, University of Denver, Colorado, USA
- 1931 – war memorial for the RATP, Richelieu – Drouot (Paris Metro)
- 1931 – architectural bas-relief La gloire de la Seine, near Pont Neuf, Paris
- 1931 – Four human races in concrete, belltower, Notre-Dame-des-Missions-du-cygne d'Enghien, with architect Paul Tournon
- 1932 – bust of Edouard Branly, Jardin du Luxembourg
- 1932 – Genie de la Mer (Spirit of the Sea), ocean liner SS Normandie, for French architect Roger-Henri Expert
- 1934–1935 – decorations, Église du Saint-Esprit (Paris, 12th arrondissement) and church of St-Louis, Marseille. Direct carving in concrete
- 1937 – exhibited The Elements, north wing of the Palais de Chaillot, Exposition Internationale
- 1950 – Monument to the Glory of the Resistance of the people of the Jura Mountains, Lons-le-Saunier (Jura)
- 1951 – Faculty of Medicine (Paris): three medallion reliefs. From this time onwards, he made many busts, portraits for medals, decorative schemes for school buildings etc.
- 1963 – La Antillaise (The West Indian Woman), Fort de France, Martinique

== Gallery ==
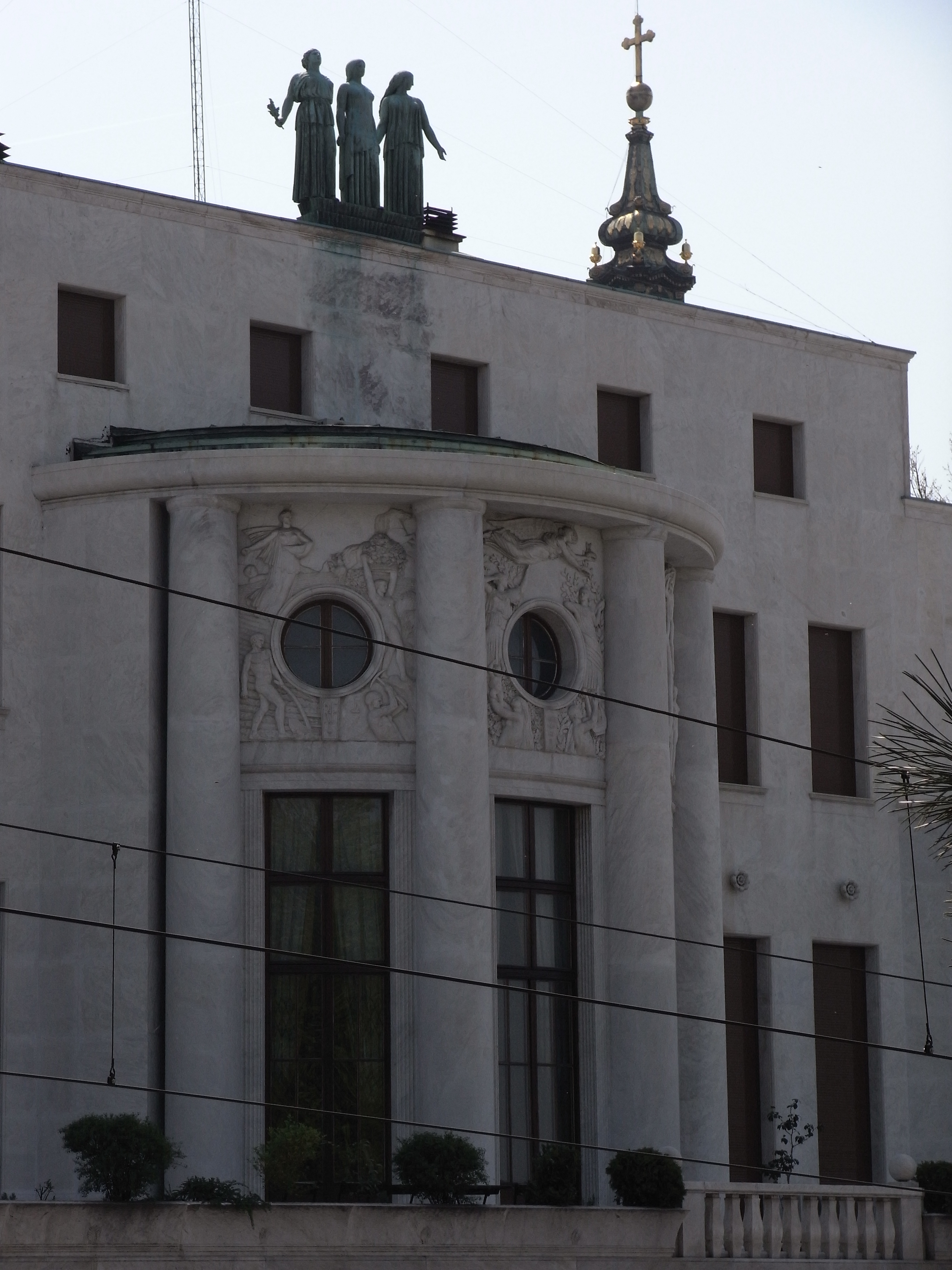
