= Church of Saint-Ferdinand des Ternes, Paris =

Church in Paris, France

Coordinates: 48.8787°N 2.2908°E

Church of Saint-Ferdinand des Ternes
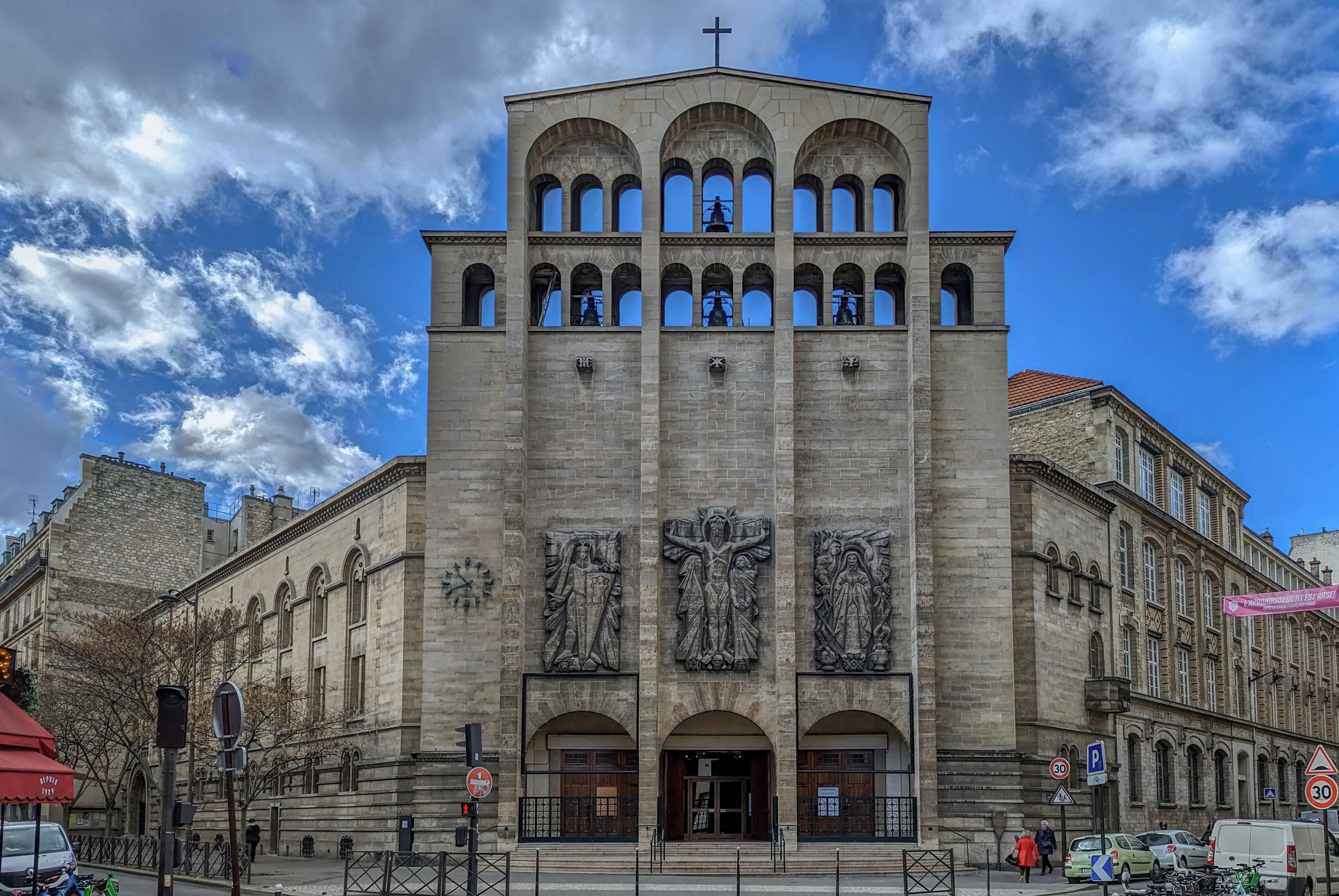

Religion
- Affiliation: Catholic Church
- Province: Archdiocese of Paris
- Region: Île-de-France
- Rite: Roman Rite

Location
- Location: Place du Général Koenig, 17th arrondissement of Paris
- State: France
- Interactive map of Church of Saint-Ferdinand des Ternes

Architecture
- Type: Parish church
- Style: Neo-Byzantine architecture,
- Groundbreaking: 1936
- Completed: 11957
- Monument historique
- Denomination: Église

The Church of Saint-Ferdinand des Ternes is a Roman Catholic parish church located in the 17th arrondissement of Paris, between rue Saint-Ferdinand and Rue Armaillel, slightly set back from the Avenue des Ternes. It was begun in 1937 but not completed until 1957. It is an example of Neo-Byzantine architecture.

== History ==
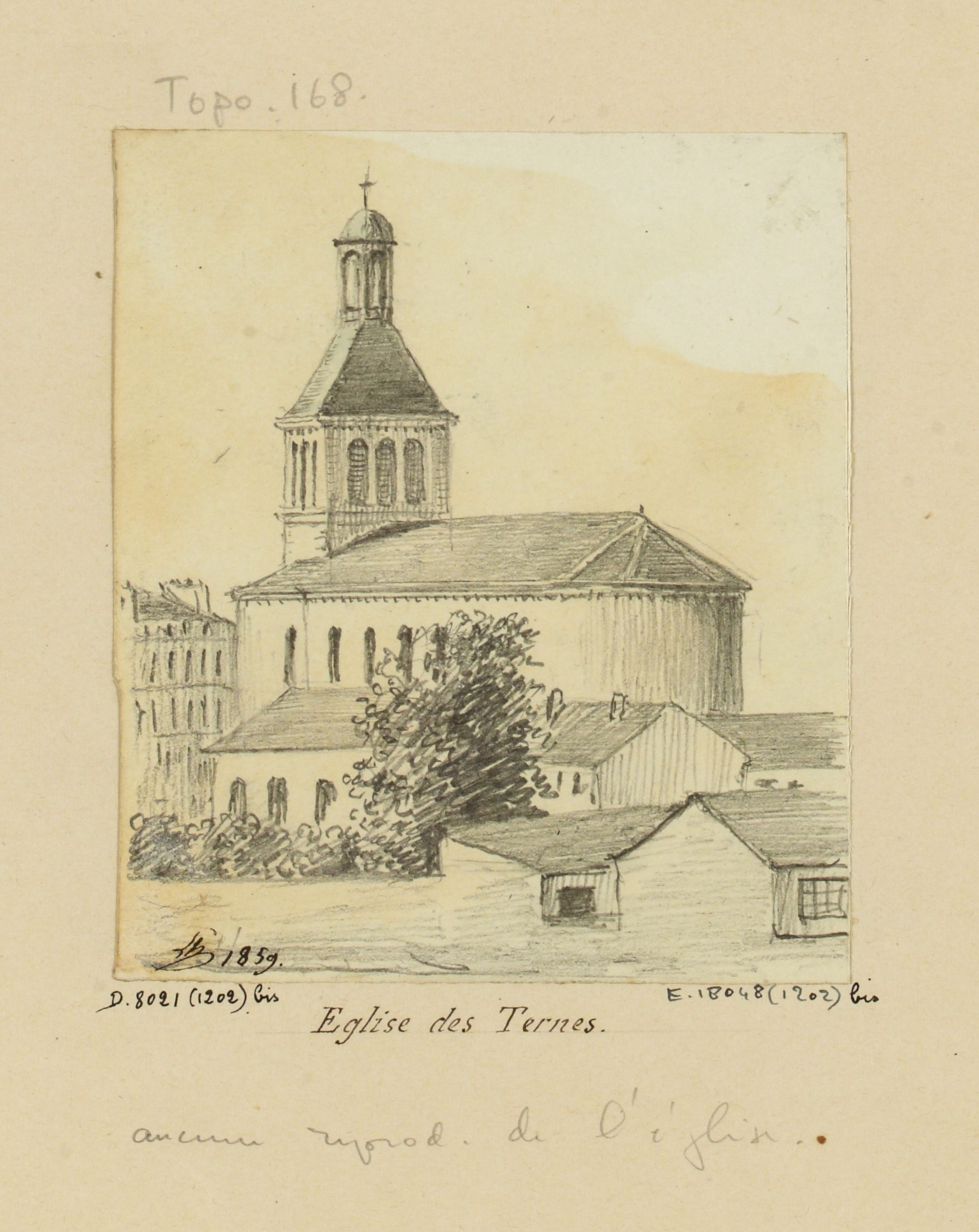
The first church in 1859

The first church on the site was built between 1842 and 1845. The village of Ternes grew quickly, and was merged into Paris in 1860. The first church took the name of Saint Ferdinand in memory of the royal prince, Ferdinand-Philippe d'Orleans, the oldest son King Louis Philippe, who was killed in a highway accident not far from the church. The architect of the first church, Paul-Eugene Lequeux (1805–1873), was a Protestant, whose work included the enlargement of the church of Saint-Marie de Batignolles.was enlarged in 1878.

As the neighbourhood and the congregation continued to grow, a larger church was begun in 1937. The architects of the new church were Paul Thedon, Frederic Betrand and Pierre Durand. The old church was gradually demolished as the new church advanced. By the outbreak of World War Two in 1939, only the choir and first traverse were finished. Work was slowed by World War II, but continued; the facade on rue d'Arkmaille was completed in January 1941, and the choir and transept were blessed and inaugurated on 22 March 1944, shortly before the Allied forces landed at Normandy. Further work had to wait, and was not restored until after the war. The final work on the nave and three cupolas was finished and dedicated in 1957.

In 1990-1991 a complete redecoration of the choir was carried out by the decorator Mzdeleine Diener, which included the altar, the pulpit furnishings and the chandeliers.

== Exterior ==
=== Facade ===
The mastive bell tower holds the three bells, named Desiree, Fernande and Rosalie, which came from the tower of the first church. The most prominent decoration of the facade is a group of three large groups of sculptures over the portals made by the sculptor George Muguey (1903-1988) They represent Saint Ferdinand (left); Christ (center) and Saint Therese and the infant Christ (right).

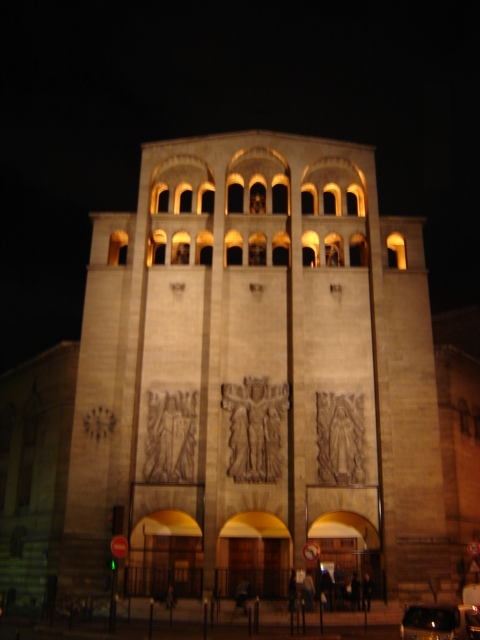
Facade on Place Tristan-Bernard at night

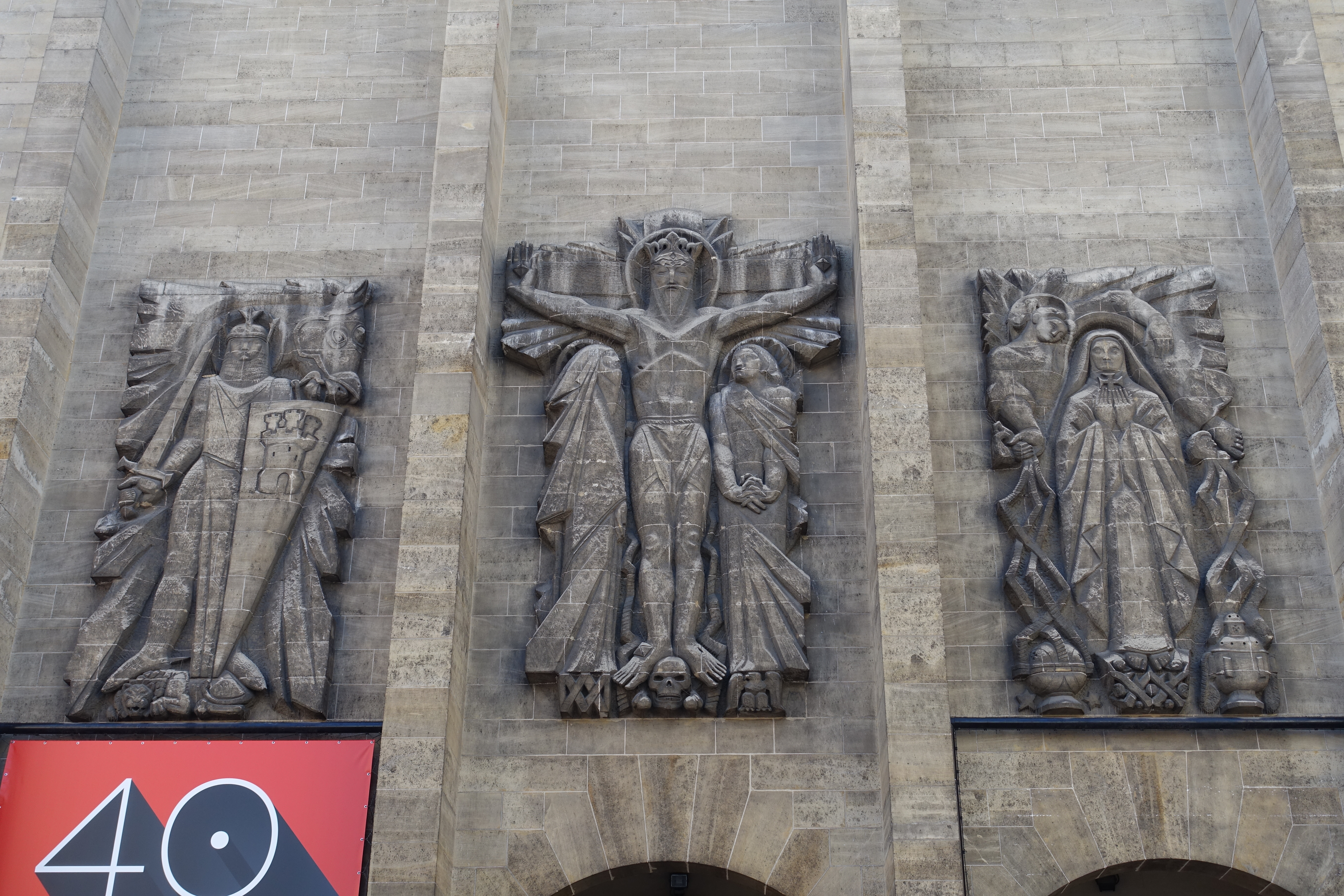
facade sculpture by Georgues Muget (1903–1988)

== Interior ==
The interior features a series of three domes, rows of hanging chandeliers, murals and sculptures adding color and animation.

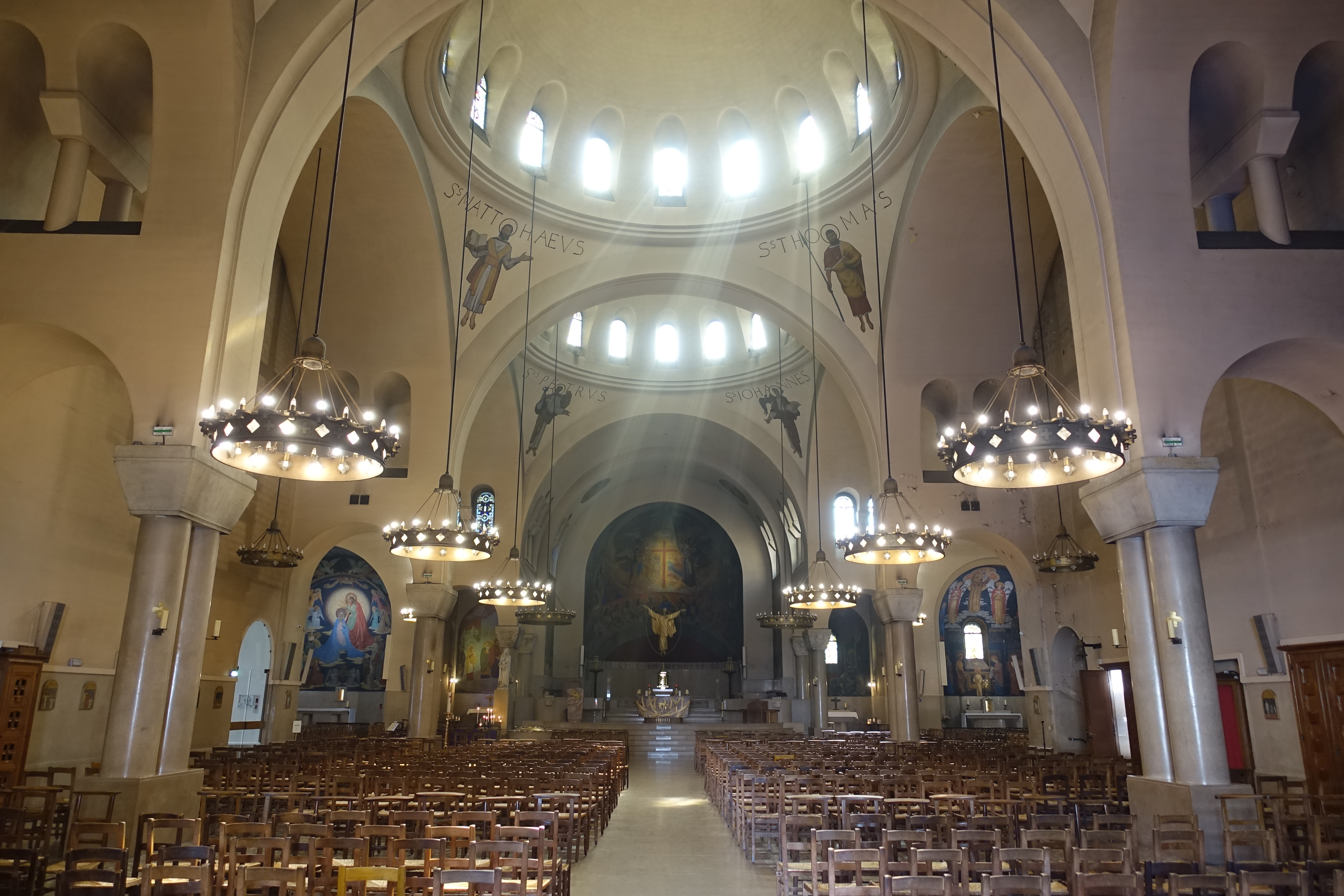
Nave facing the choir

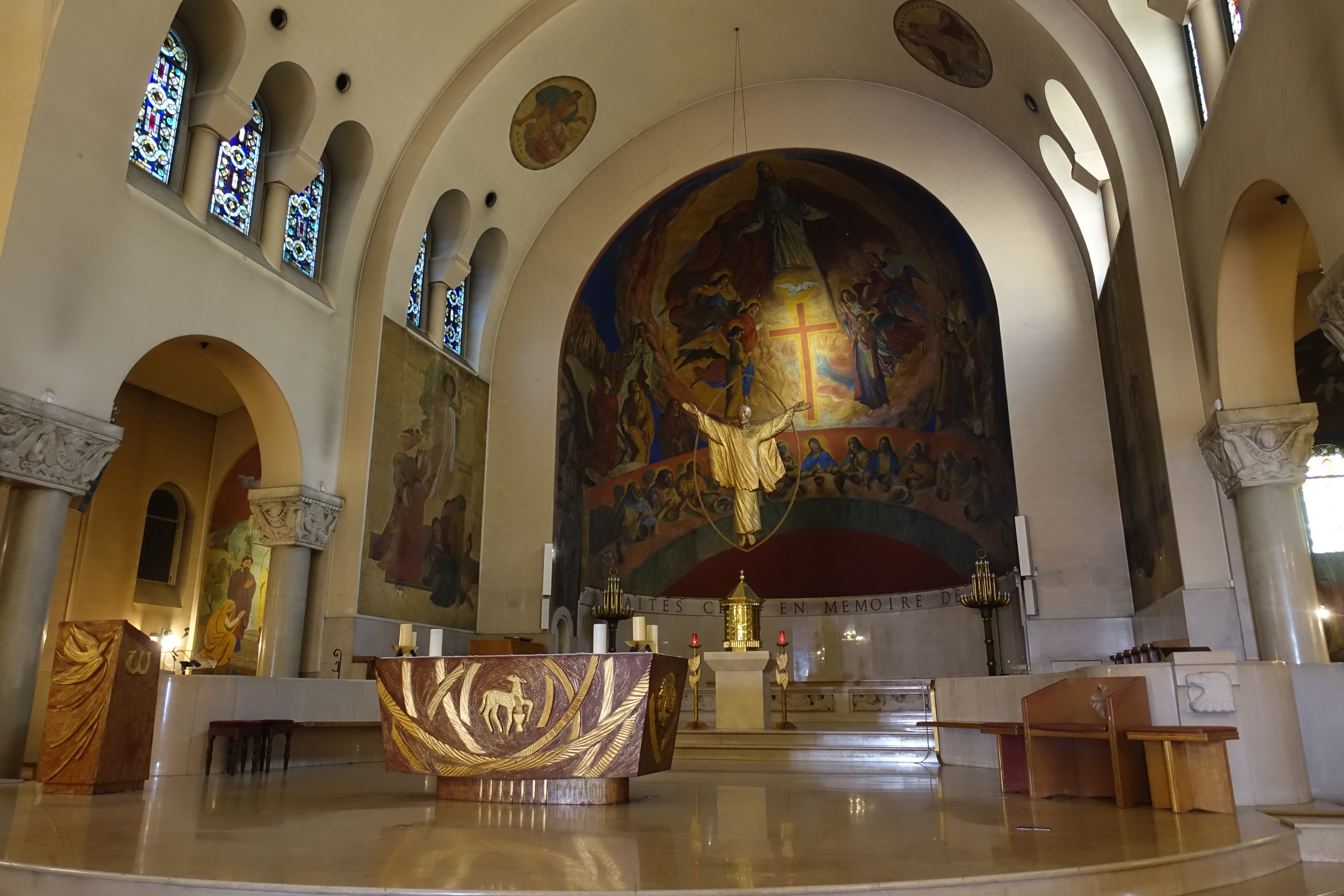
Altar and the choir

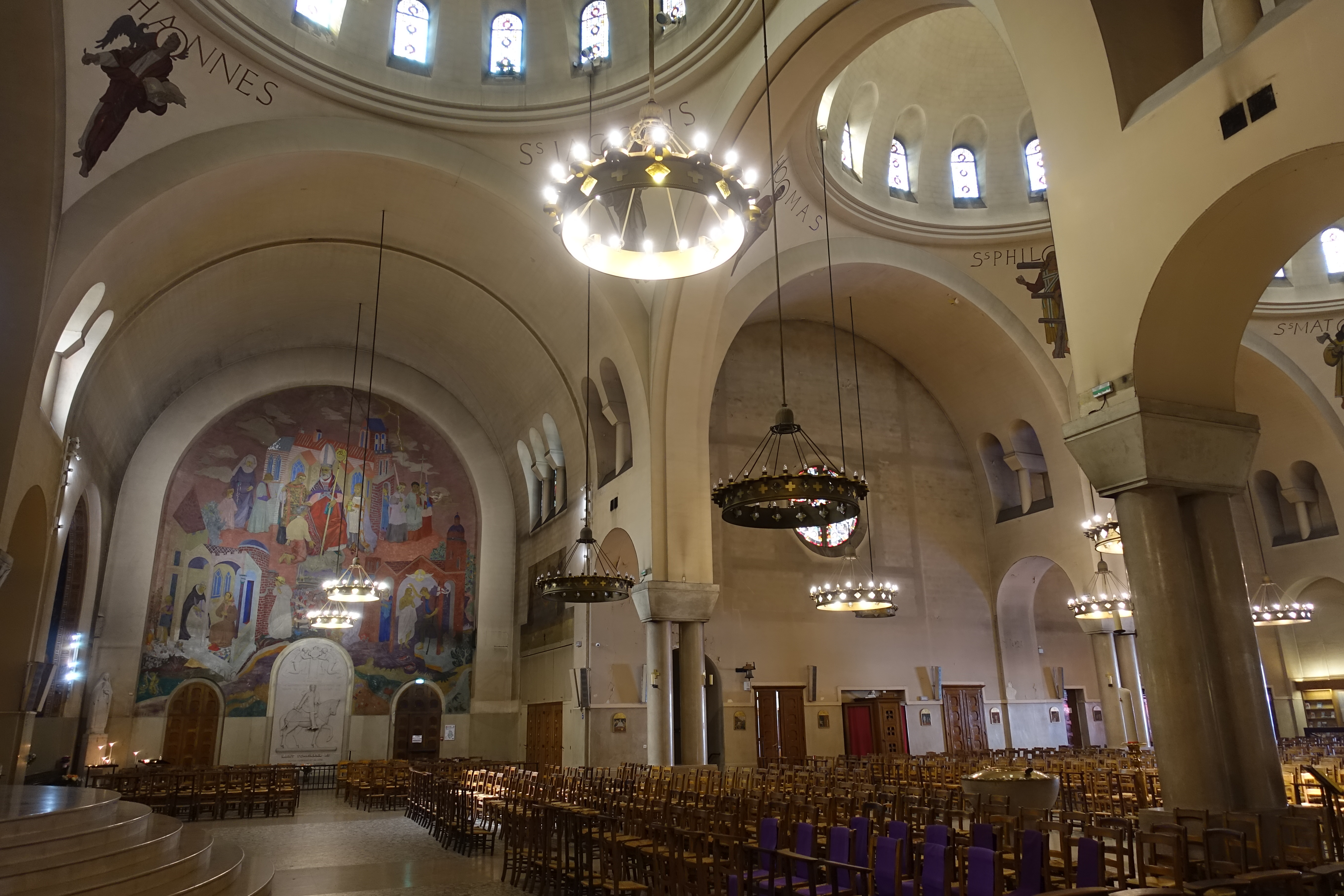
The Transept

== Art and decoration ==
The interior of the church displays a broad variety of paintings, sculpture and stained glass from the mid-20th century. High above, Stained glass windows depicting Saints are flanked by geometric windows.

The decoration of the choir is particularly dramatic . The central feature is a large mural by Pierre Dionisi (1904-1976) depicting Biblical scenes including the Last Supper and the sacrifice of the Mass, A gilded, illuminated sculpture of Christ rising is suspended in front of the mural, and above the altar.

The chapels around of the church have multiple and varied works of art. The chapel of Saint Joseph in the right transept of the church features a mural by Alfred Tondu (1903-1980) showing scenes from the life of Saint Ferdinand. The Chapel of the Virgin in the left crossing of the transept displays a large mural depicting the Crowning of the Virgin, in a style resembling the simplicity children's book drawings. childThe left transept features a large, very realistic statue of the Crucifixion by Antoine-Auguste Preault,emphasizing the suffering of Christ.

Recent additions to the church decoration include a series of mosaics depicting the Stations of the Cross by Cecile Bouvarel, added in 1993.

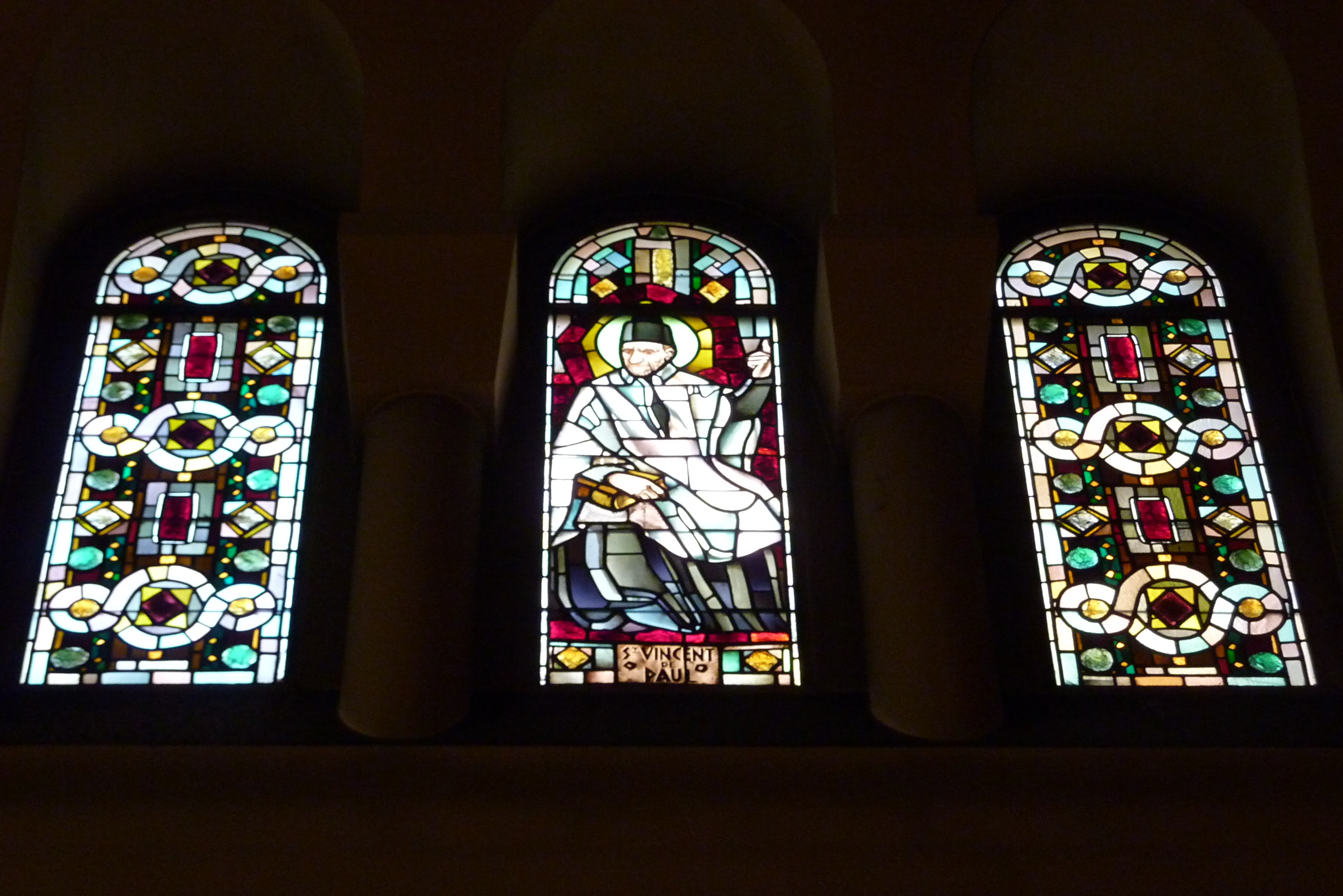
Saint Vincent de Paul window flanked by geometric windows

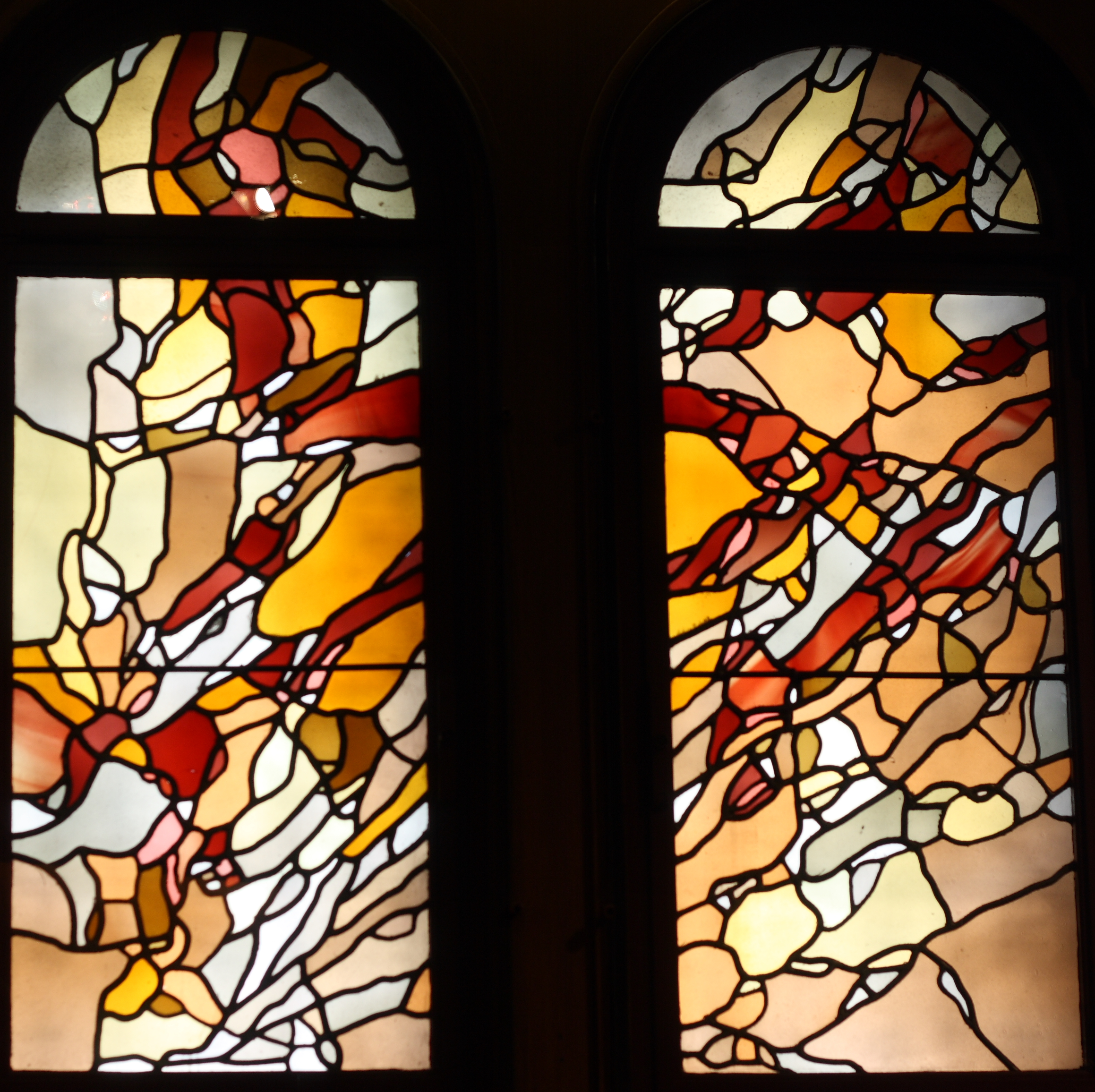
Geometric windows

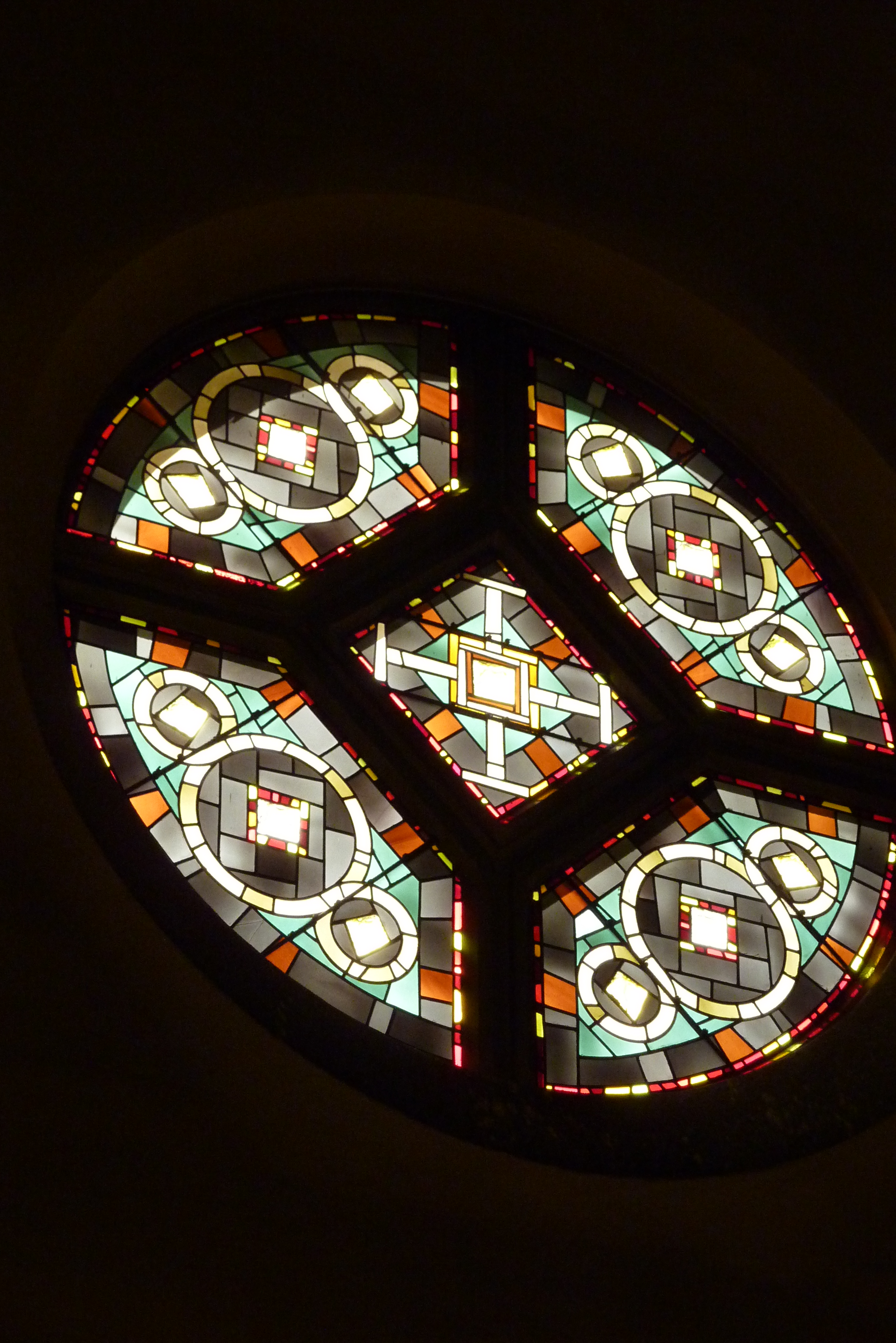
Geometric window

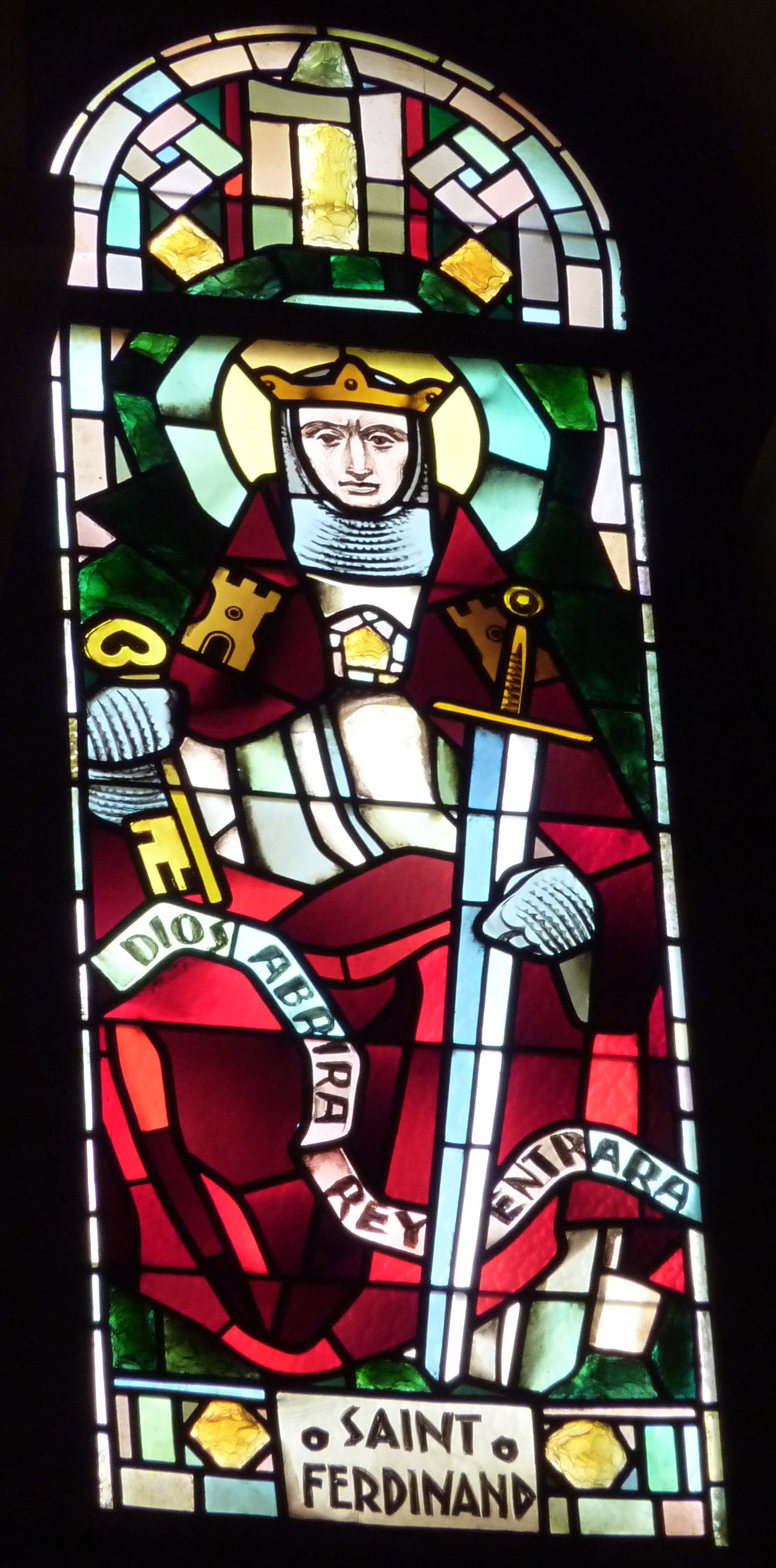
Saint Ferdinand transept window
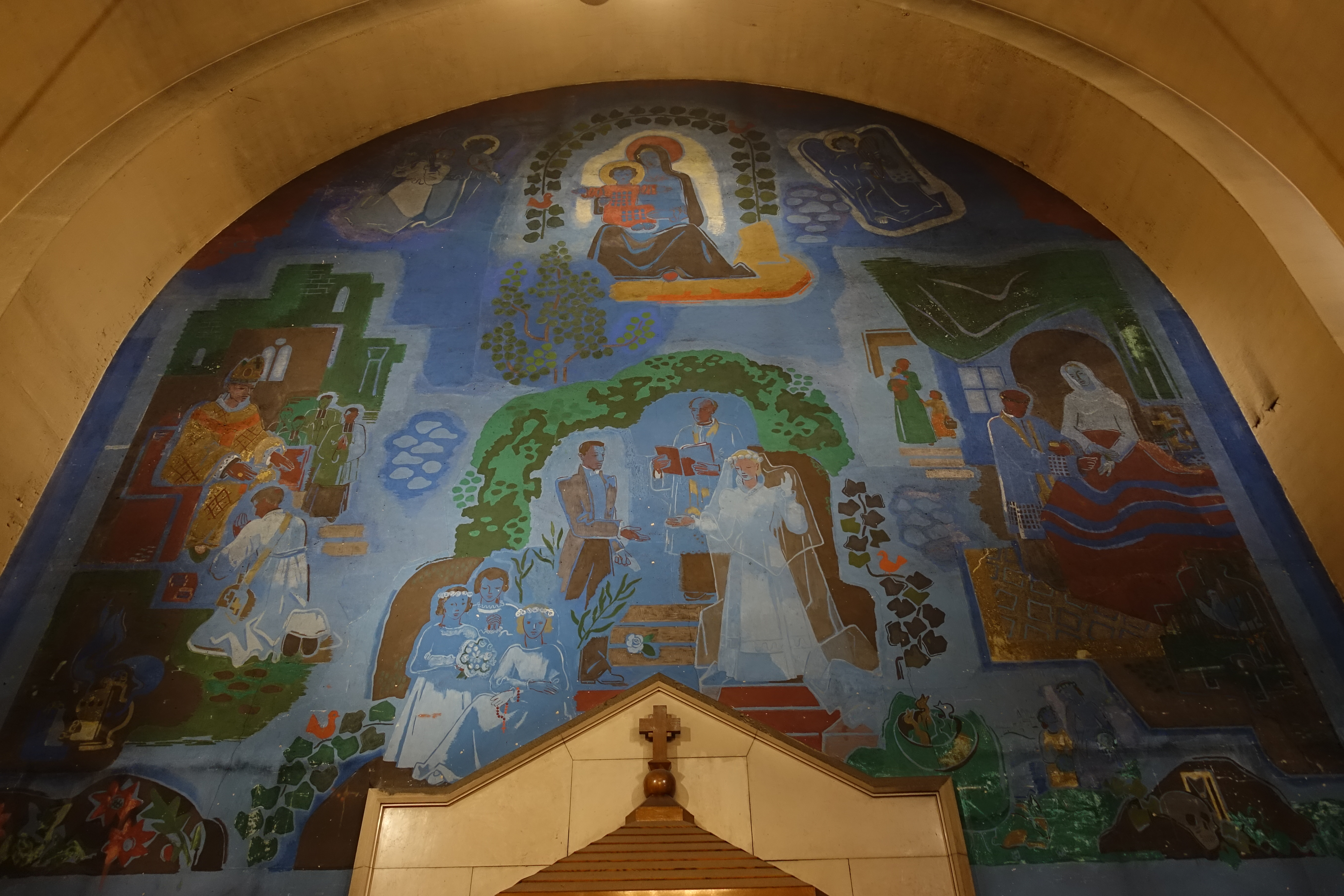
Mural in the wedding chapel by Alfred Tondu (1903-1980)

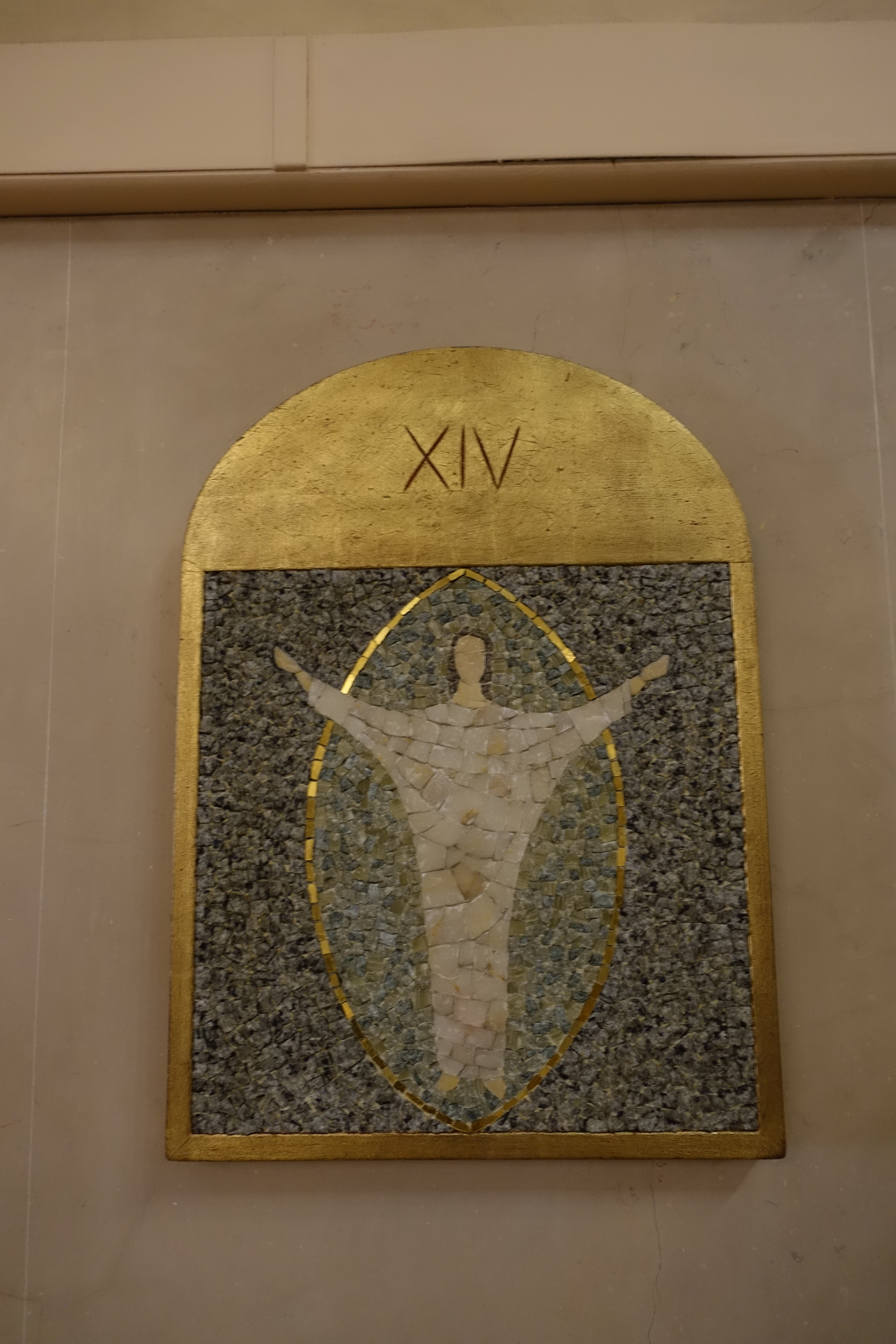
Mosaic from the Stations of the Cross, by Cecile Bouvarel (1993)

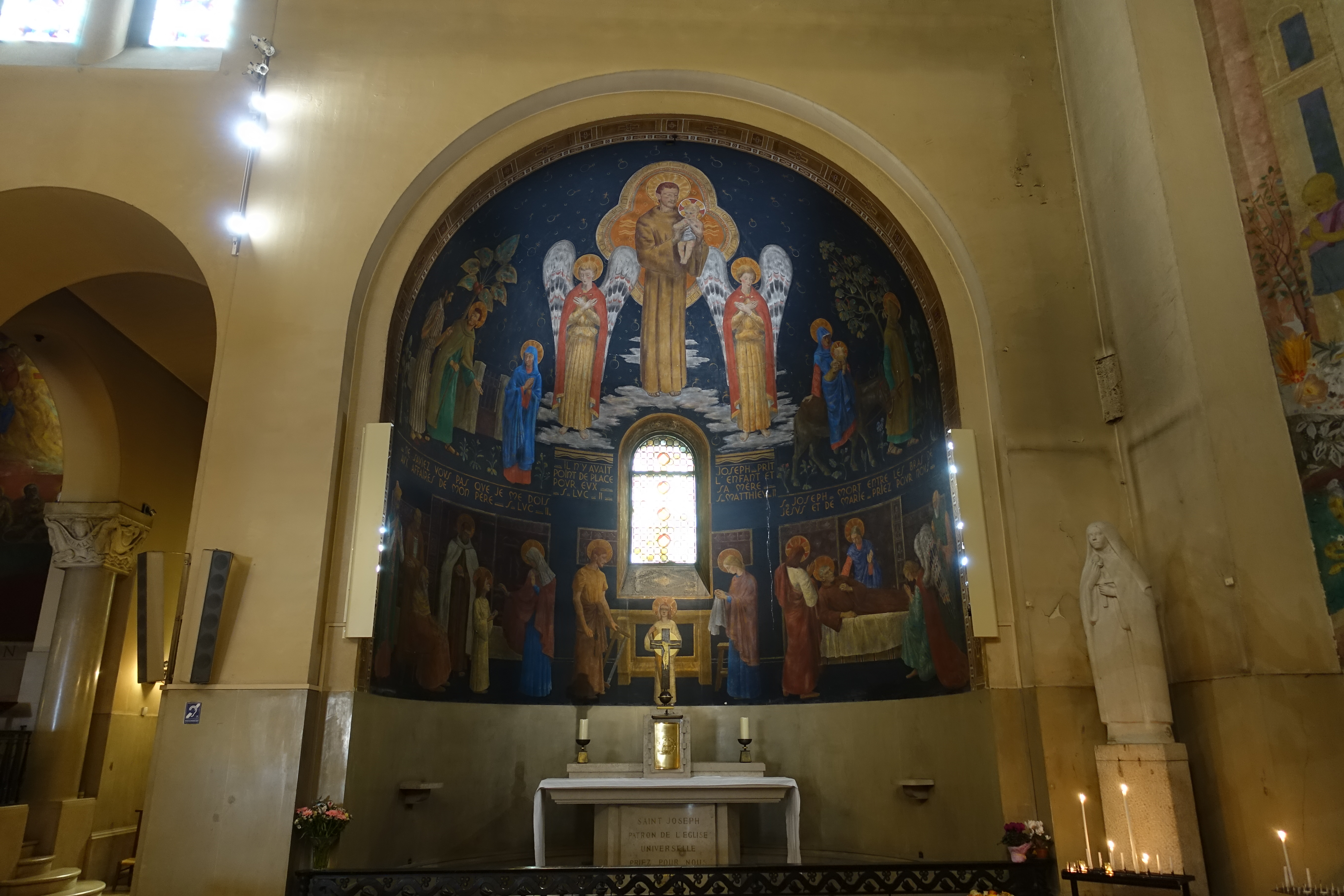
Chapel of Saint Joseph, with painting by Alfred Tondu

== Organ ==
The organ of the church, placed in the tribune over the central portal, is a modern instrument made by the workshop of Quorin (1994–95).
