= Maurice Denis =

French painter (1870–1943)

Maurice Denis TOSD
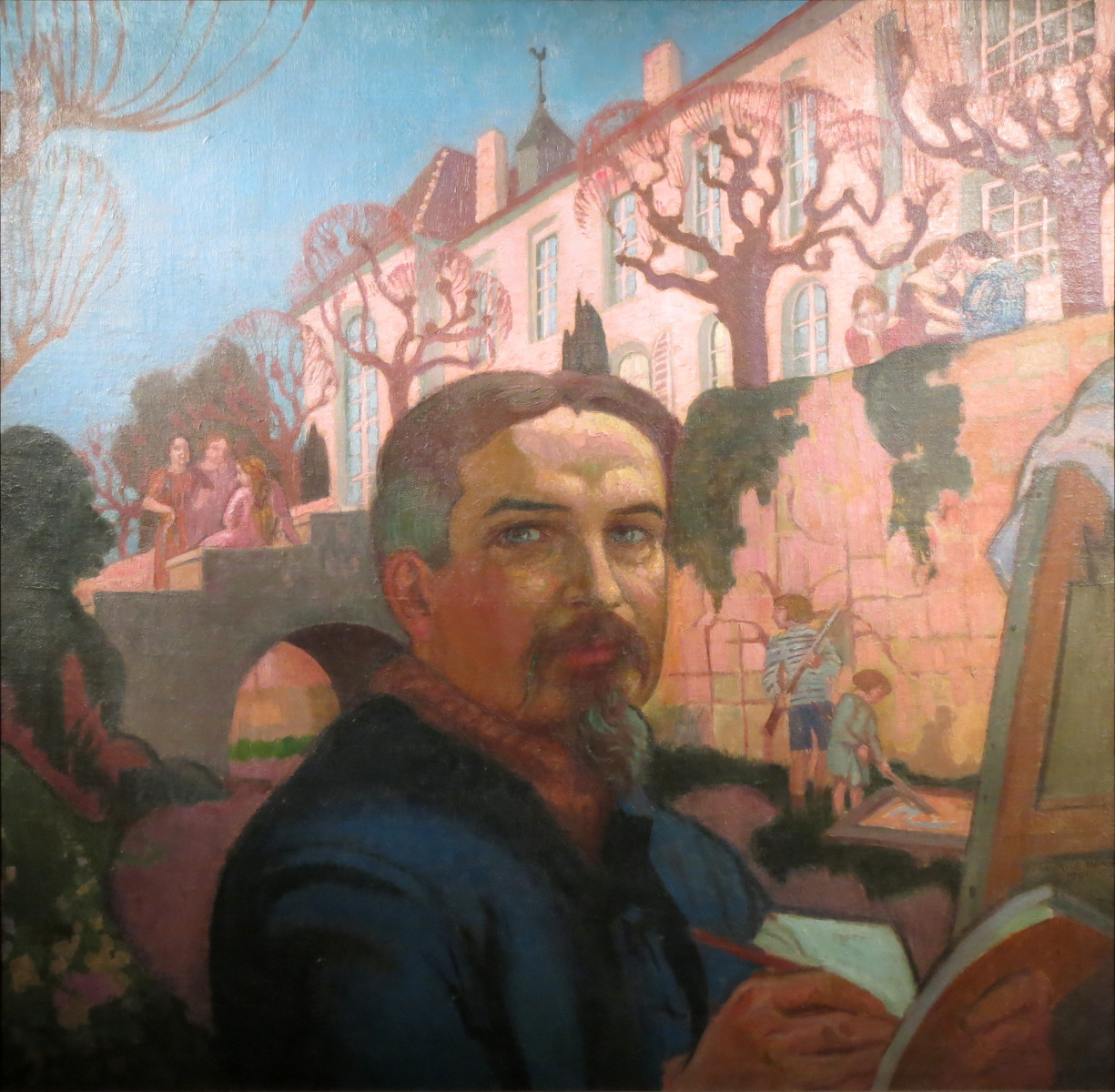
- Self-portrait, 1916
- Born: Maurice Denis; 25 November 1870; Granville, Manche, France
- Died: 13 November 1943 (aged 72); Paris, France
- Education: École des Beaux-Arts, Académie Julian
- Known for: Painting, drawing

Maurice Denis (French: [dəni]; 25 November 1870 – 13 November 1943) was a French painter, decorative artist, and writer. An important figure in the changing world of late 19th-century European art, Denis is associated with Les Nabis, Symbolism, and later Neo-classicism. His theories contributed to the foundations of Cubism, Fauvism, and abstraction. After World War I, Denis founded the Ateliers d'Art Sacré (Workshops of Sacred Art), decorated the interiors of churches, and worked for a revival of religious art.

== Biography ==
=== Early life ===
Maurice Denis was born 25 November 1870, in Granville, Manche, a coastal town in the Normandy region of France. His father was of modest peasant origins; after four years in the army, he went to work at the railroad station. His mother, the daughter of a miller, worked as a seamstress. After their marriage in 1865, they moved to Saint-Germain-en-Laye in the Paris suburbs. His father was employed in the offices the administration of the Western Railroads in Paris.

Maurice was an only child. From an early age, his passions were religion and art. He began keeping a journal in 1884 at the age of thirteen. In 1885 he recorded in his journal his admiration for the colors, candle light and incense of the ceremonies at the local church. He frequented the Louvre, and admired especially the works of Fra Angelico, Raphael and Botticelli. At the age of fifteen he wrote in his journal, "Yes, I must that I become a Christian painter, that I celebrate all the miracles of Christianity, I feel that is what is needed." In 1887 he discovered a new source of inspiration, the works of Puvis de Chavannes.

Denis was accepted as a student at one of the most prestigious Paris schools, the Lycée Condorcet, where he excelled at philosophy. However, he decided to leave the school at the end of 1887 and in 1888 enrolled in Académie Julian to prepare for the entrance examination to the École des Beaux-Arts in Paris. There he studied with the painter and theorist Jules Joseph Lefebvre. He passed the entrance examination for the Beaux-Arts in July 1888, and passed another examination in November to receive his baccalaureate in philosophy.

=== Les Nabis ===
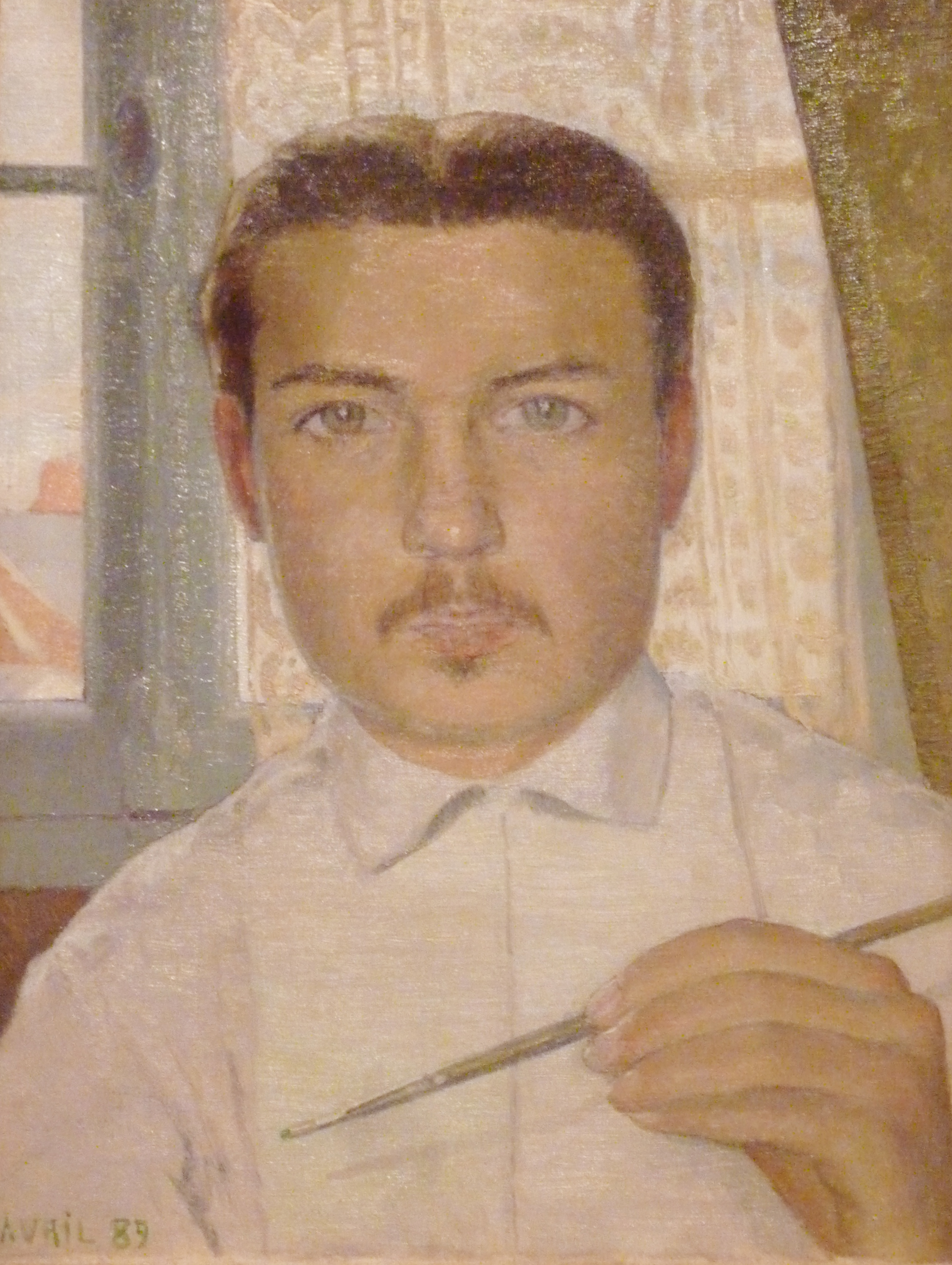
Self-portrait at the age of 18 (1889)

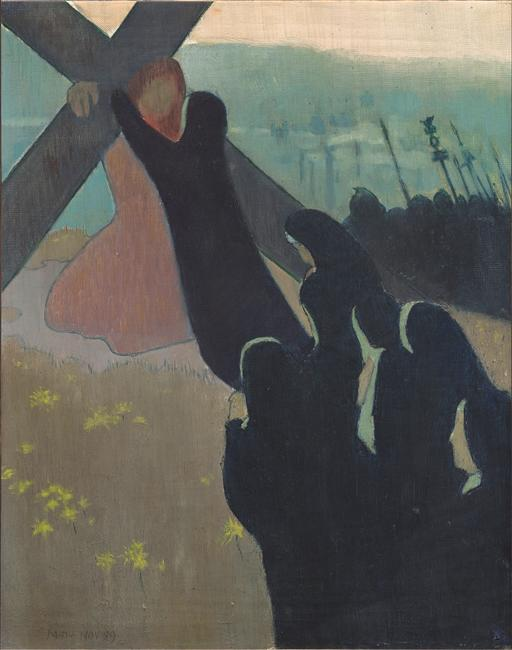
Climbing to Calvary (1889)

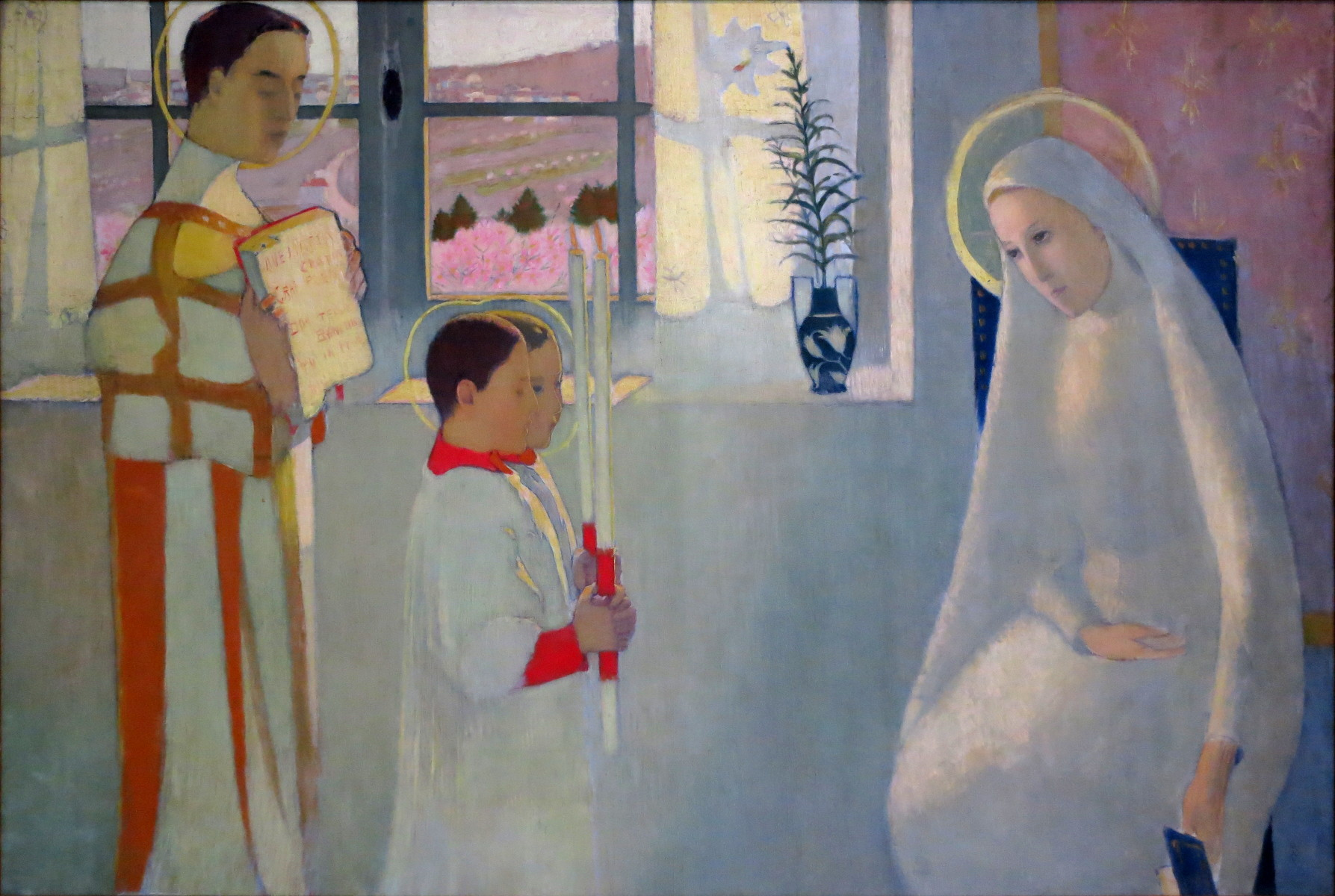
Le Mystere Catholique (1889)

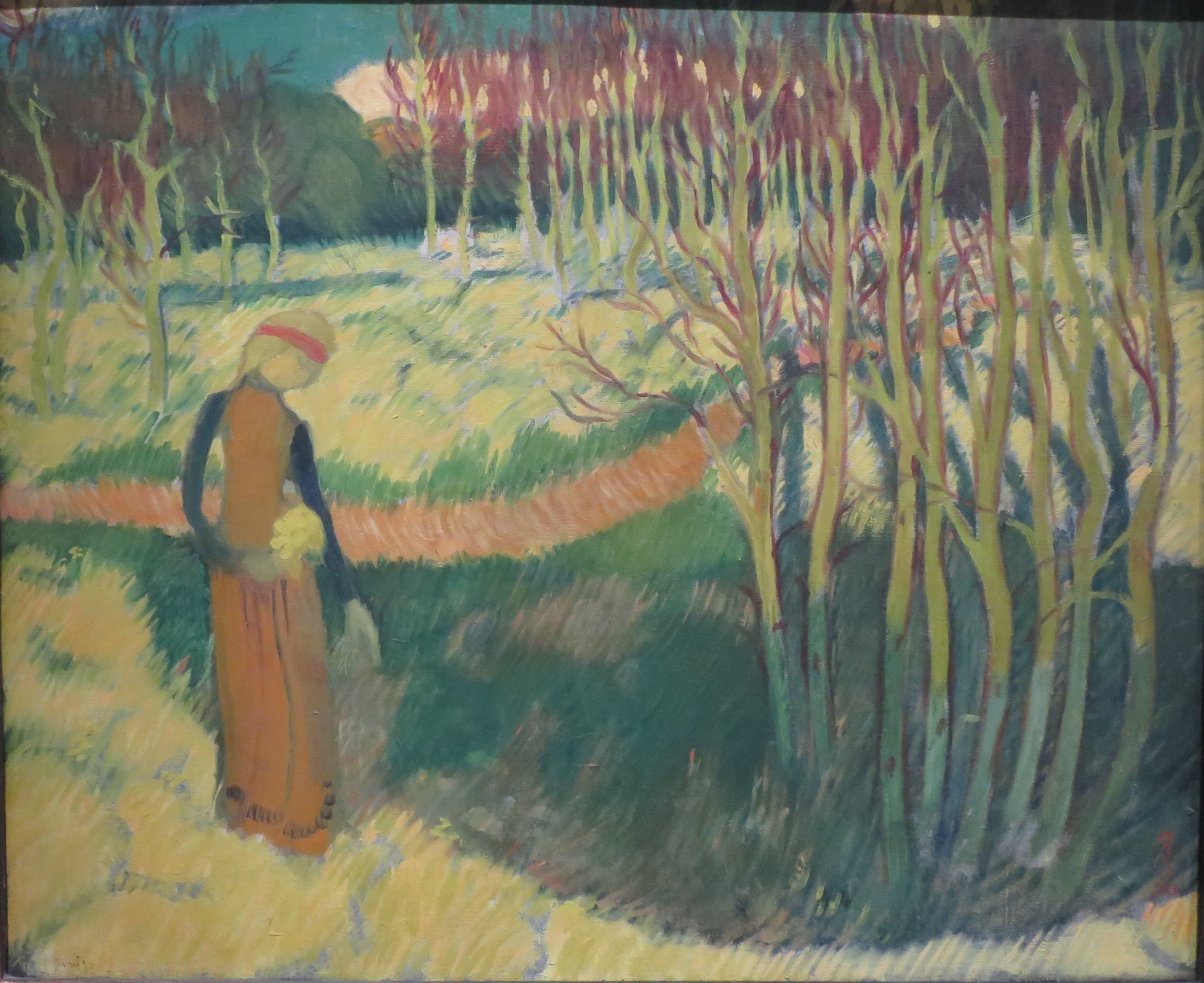
Motif Romanesque (1890), Los Angeles County Museum of Art

At the Académie Julian, his fellow students included Paul Sérusier and Pierre Bonnard, who had shared ideas about painting. Through Bonnard, Denis met additional artists, including Édouard Vuillard, Paul Ranson, Ker-Xavier Roussel and Hermann-Paul. In 1890 they formed the artistic group Les Nabis, the name taken from "Nabi" the Hebrew name for "prophet". Their philosophy was based upon the philosophy of positivism and the writings of Auguste Comte and Hippolyte Taine. Denis described in 1909: "Art is no longer a visual sensation that we gather, like a photograph, as it were, of nature. No, it is a creation of our spirit, for which nature is only the occasion."

Denis was first drawn toward the Neo-impressionist style of Georges Seurat, but rejected it as too scientific. In 1889, Denis was captivated by an exhibition of works by Gauguin and others at a Volpini exhibition in a café near the grounds of the Exposition Universelle in Paris. Recalling it later, Denis wrote, "What amazement, followed by what a revelation! In place of windows opening on nature, like the impressionists, these were surfaces which were solidly decorative, powerfully colorful, bordered with brutal strokes, partitioned." The work of Gauguin had an immediate effect on Denis's work. The brightly colored forms of Gauguin's Vache au-dessus du gouffre first shown in 1889, appeared in an October 1890 work by Denis, Taches du soleil sur la terrace, and later in Denis's Solitude du Christ (1918).

The Nabis drifted apart by the end of the 1880s, but their ideas influenced the later work of both Bonnard and Vuillard, as well as non-Nabi painters like Henri Matisse.

=== Modernist ===
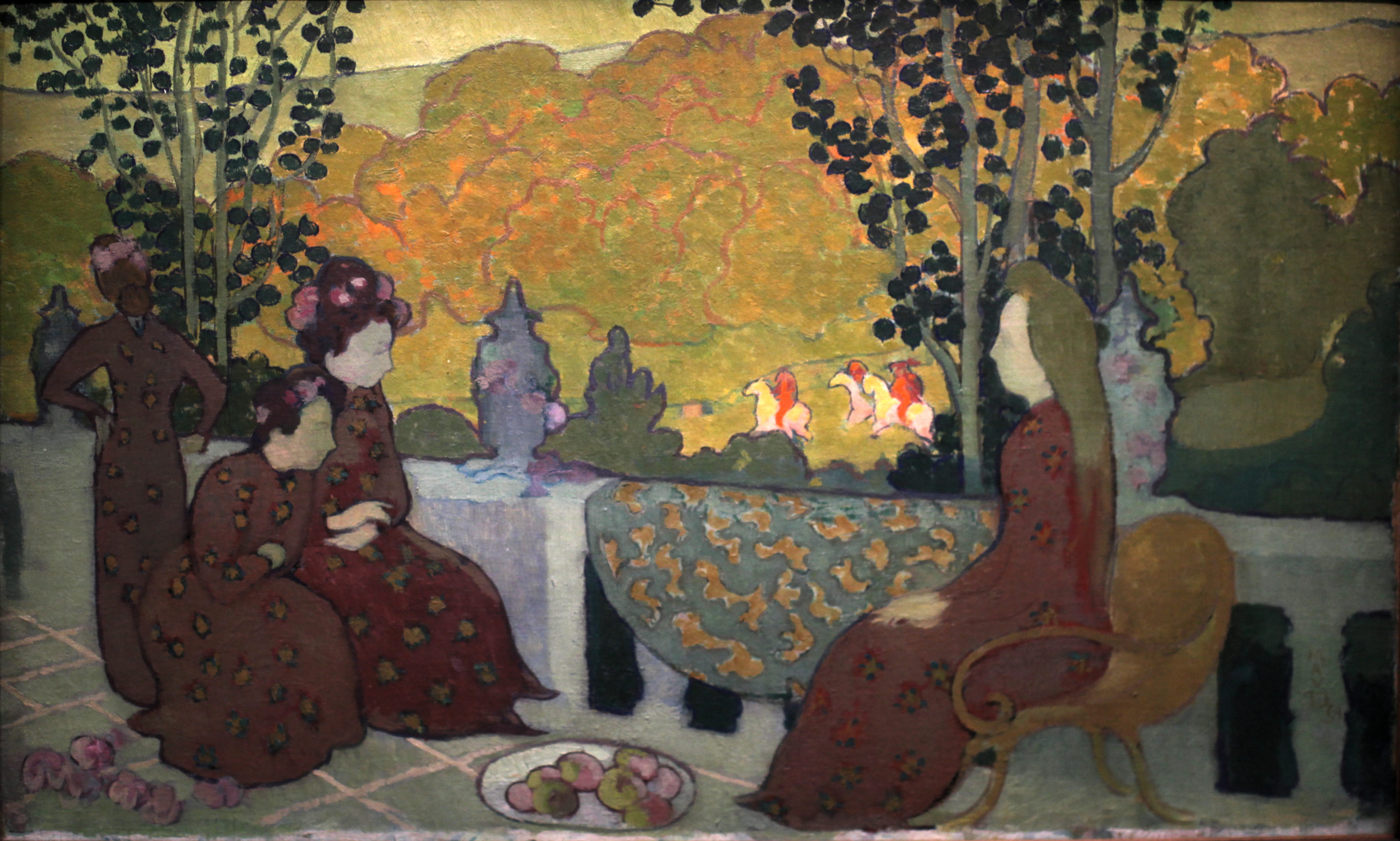
September Evening, (1891), Musée d'Orsay

Another influence on Denis at the time was the art of Japan. The interest of French artists in Japanese arts had begun in the 1850s, then was renewed by displays at the Paris Universal Exposition (1855) and was revived again in 1890 by a major retrospective of Japanese prints at the École des Beaux-Arts. Even before 1890 Denis had been cutting out and studying the illustrations of the catalog Japan Artistique published by Siegfried Bing. In November 1888 he had declared to his friend Émile Bernard that he wanted to move from "Giving color to (Puvis de Chavannes)" to "making a blend with Japan." His paintings in the Japanese style featured a wide format and very stylized composition and decoration, appearing like Japanese screens.

=== "A flat surface covered with colors assembled in a certain order" ===
In August 1890, Denis consolidated his new ideas and presented them in a famous essay published in the review Art et Critique. The celebrated opening line of the essay was: "Remember that a picture, before being a battle horse, a female nude or some sort of anecdote, is essentially a flat surface covered with colors assembled in a certain order." This idea was not original to Denis; the idea had been forward not long before by Hippolyte Taine in The Philosophy of Art, where Taine wrote: "A painting is a colored surface, in which the various tones and various degrees of light are placed with a certain choice; that is its intimate being." However, it was the expression of Denis that seized the attention of artists and became part of the foundation of modernism.

Denis was among the first artists to insist on the flatness of the picture plane—a starting point for modernism. However, as Denis explained, he did not mean that form of the painting was more important than the subject. He went on to write: "The profoundness of our emotions comes from the sufficiency of these lines and these colors to explain themselves...everything is contained in the beauty of the work." In his essay, Denis termed this new movement "neo-traditionalism", in opposition to the Neo-Impressionists, led by Seurat. With the publication of this article, Denis became the best-known spokesperson for the philosophy of the Nabis, though in fact that group was very diverse and had many different opinions about art.

The next major event in the life of Denis was his meeting with Marthe Meurier in October 1890. From June 1891 they had a long romance, meticulously documented in his journal, and were married on 12 June 1893. She became an important part of his art, appearing in many pictures and also in decorative works, such painted fans, often as an idealized figure representing purity and love.

=== Symbolism ===
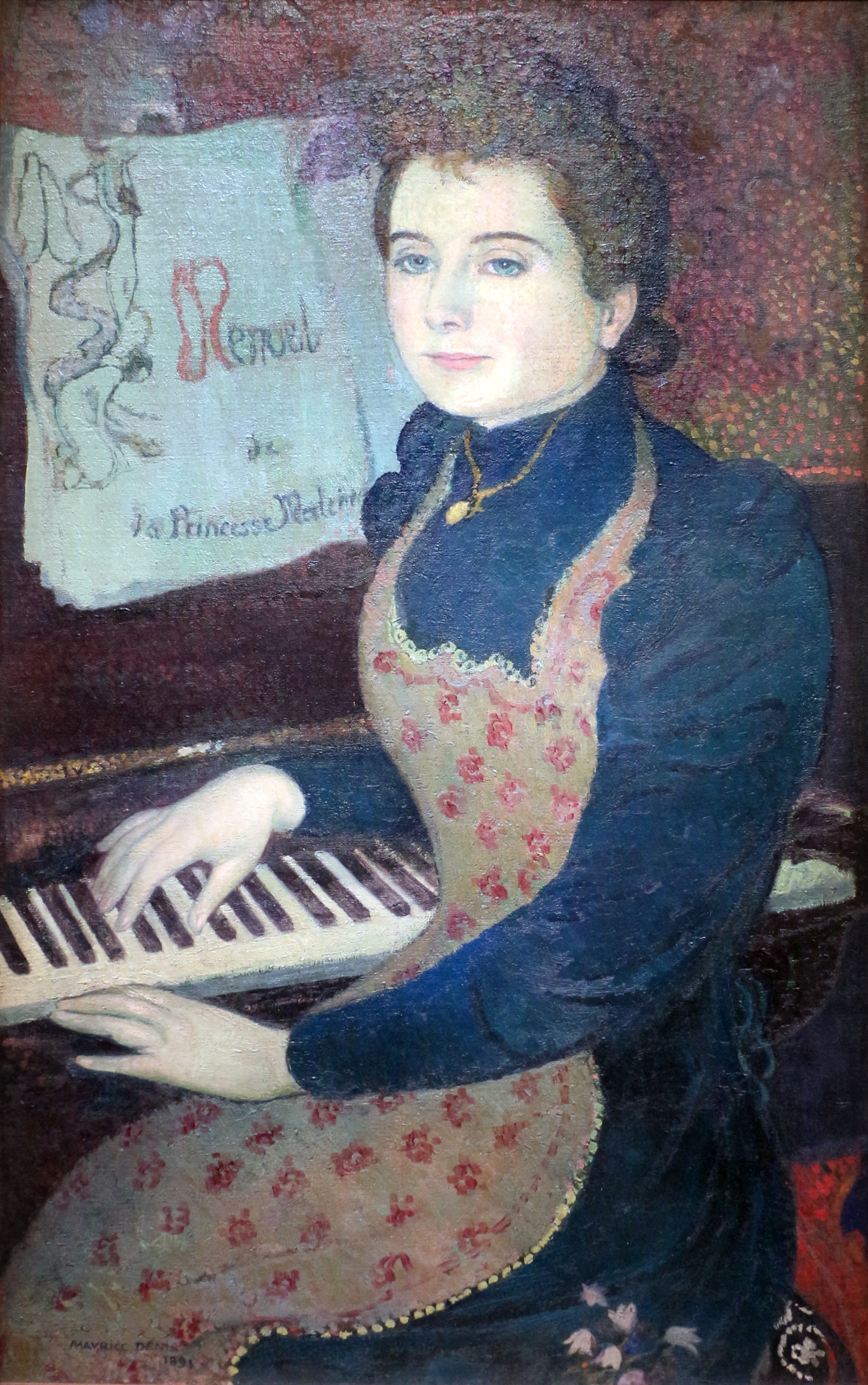
Marthe at the Piano (1891)

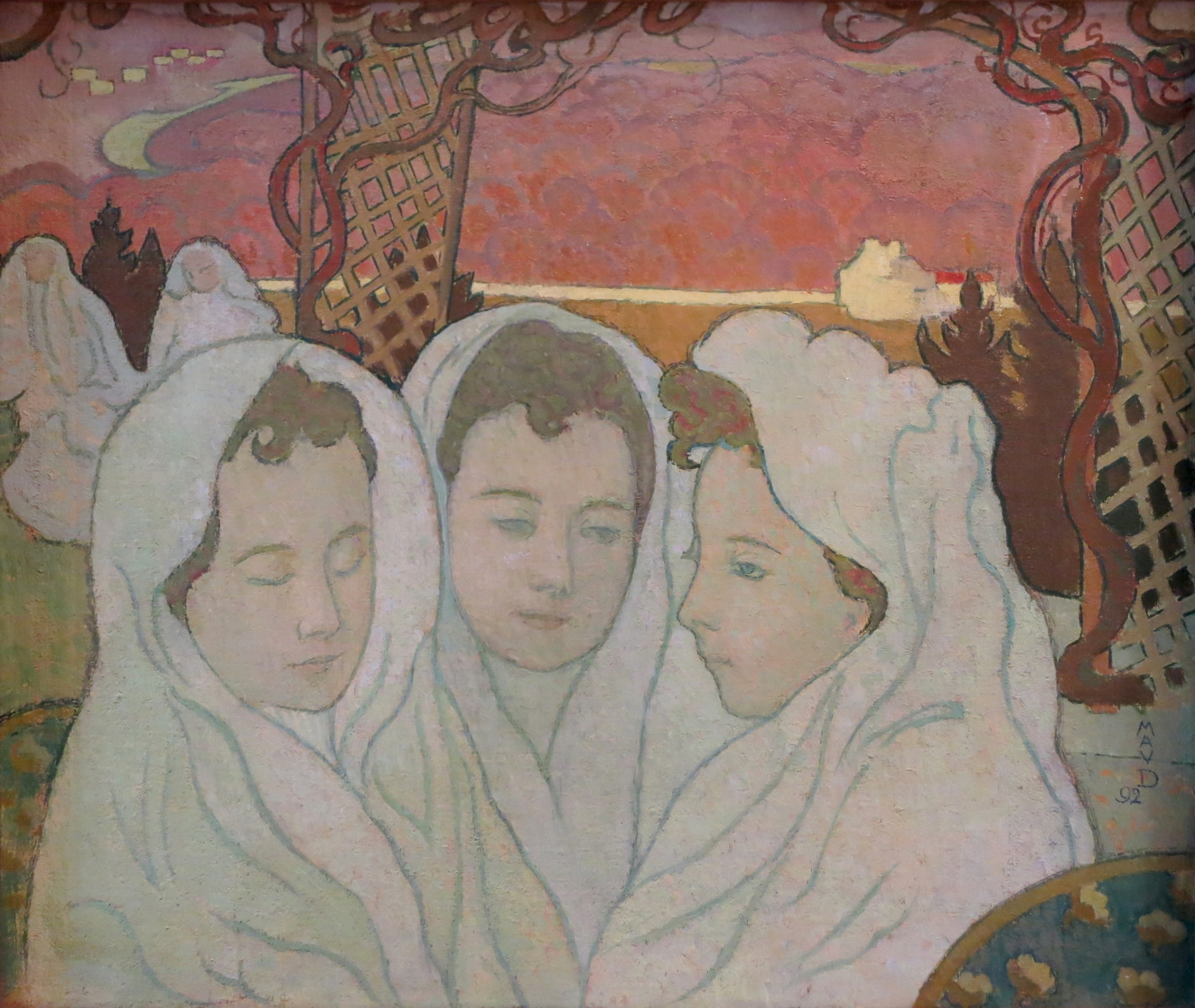
Triple Portrait of Marthe (1892)

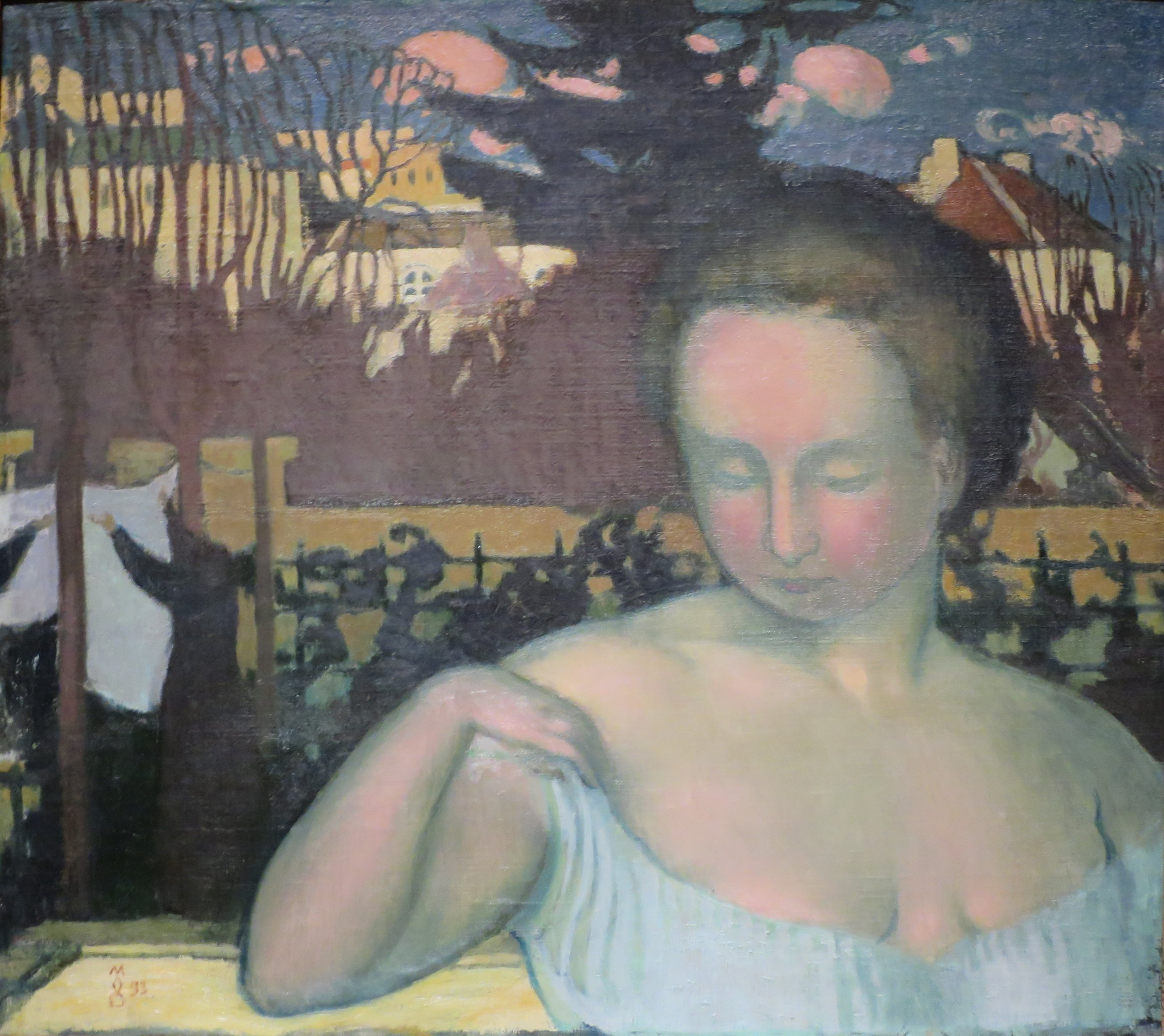
Portrait of Marthe, (1893)

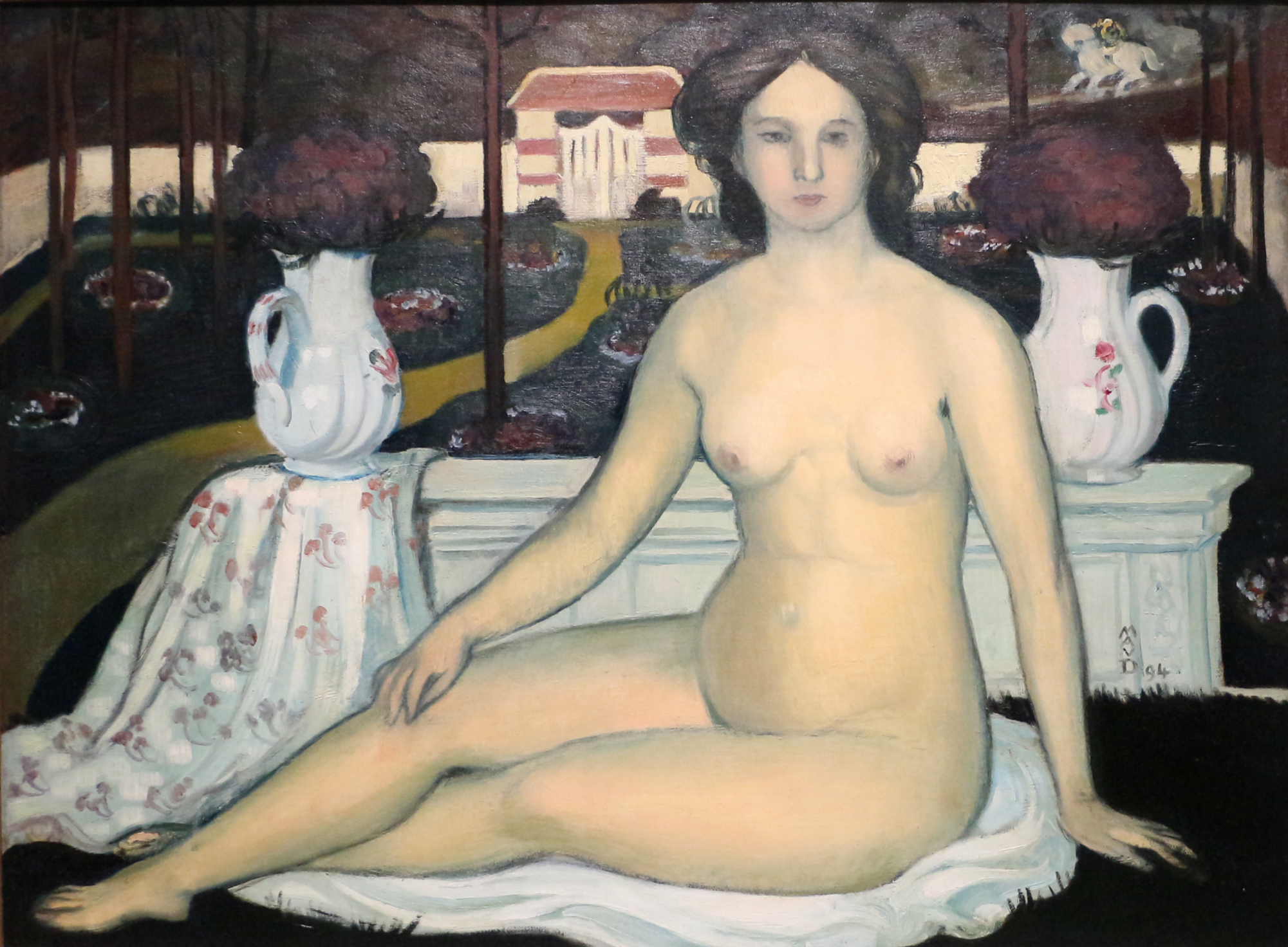
Nude with Bouquet of Violets (1894)

By the early 1890s, Denis had arrived at the artistic philosophy which guided most of his later work, and which changed very little; that the essence of art was to express love and faith, which to him were similar things. On 24 March 1895 he wrote in his journal: "Art remains a sure refuge, the hope of a reason in life from now on, and the consoling thought that little beauty manifests itself in our lives, and that we are continuing the work of Creation....Therefore the work of art has merit, inscribed in the marvelous beauty of flowers, of light, in the proportion of trees and shape of waves, and the perfection of faces; to inscribe our poor and lamentable life of suffering, of hope and of thought."

An independent Salon had been formed in 1884 and in 1890 the official Salon broke into two parts, with the formation of the Société national des Beaux-Arts, with its own annual show. Denis showed his works in both salons, as well as the La Libre Esthétique salon in Brussels, a leading European showcase for avan-garde art. The literary movement called symbolism was launched by Jean Moréas in an article in Le Figaro in 1891. In March 1891 the critic George-Albert Dourer wrote an article for the Mercure-de-France calling Denis the leading example of "symbolism in painting". The work of Denis attracted the attention of critics and of important patrons, most notably Arthur Huc, the owner of the prominent newspaper La Dépêche de Toulouse who organized his own art salons and purchased a number of works by Denis.

Denis experimented with other art forms and with decorative art. Beginning in 1889, to illustrate an edition of the book of poems Sagesse by Paul Verlaine, Denis carved a series of seven highly stylized woodblock prints, distilling the essence of his work. His patron Huc commissioned two large decorative panels, in the form of tapestries, for his Toulouse office. Denis, like other artists of the period, also designed colorful lithograph posters with the arabesque curves of the Art Nouveau.

Beginning in 1891, shortly after his engagement, Denis made Marthe the most frequent subject of his paintings; she was depicted, in purified and idealized form, doing household tasks, taking naps, and at the dining room table. She appeared in his landscapes, and in his most ambitious works of the time, The series called The Muses, which he began in 1893, and showed at the Salon of Independents in 1893. He sold the first painting to his friend Arthur Fontaine; In 1899 The French state acquired one of the paintings, his first official recognition.

Throughout the 1890s, Denis developed a growing interest in the connections between music and art. Marthe Denis played the piano. Denis painted a portrait of his wife at the piano in 1890 and made a lithograph, featuring Marthe, for the cover for the sheet music of La Damoiselle élue by Claude Debussy. He made another lithograph based on the poem Pelléas et Mélisande by Maurice Maeterlinck, which Debussy had transformed into an opera. In 1894, Denis painted La Petit Air, based on the poem Princesse Maleine by Stéphane Mallarmé, the most prominent literary proponent of Symbolism. In 1893, Denis, in a collaborative project with the writer André Gide, provided a series of thirty lithographs to accompany a long essay by Gide, called Le Voyage d'Urien.

Denis also portrayed the theme of sacred love and profane love. A painting with three female figures, two nude and one clothed, following the model of Le Concert Champêtre and L'Amour Sacré et L'Amour Profane of Titian and Déjeuner sur l'herbe by Manet. The setting is his own garden, with the viaduct of Saint-Germain-en-Laye in the background. The nude figures represented sacred love, and he clothed figure profane love. He made another painting, of Marthe nude in the garden, representing both sacred and profane love in one figure.

=== Art Nouveau and decorative arts ===
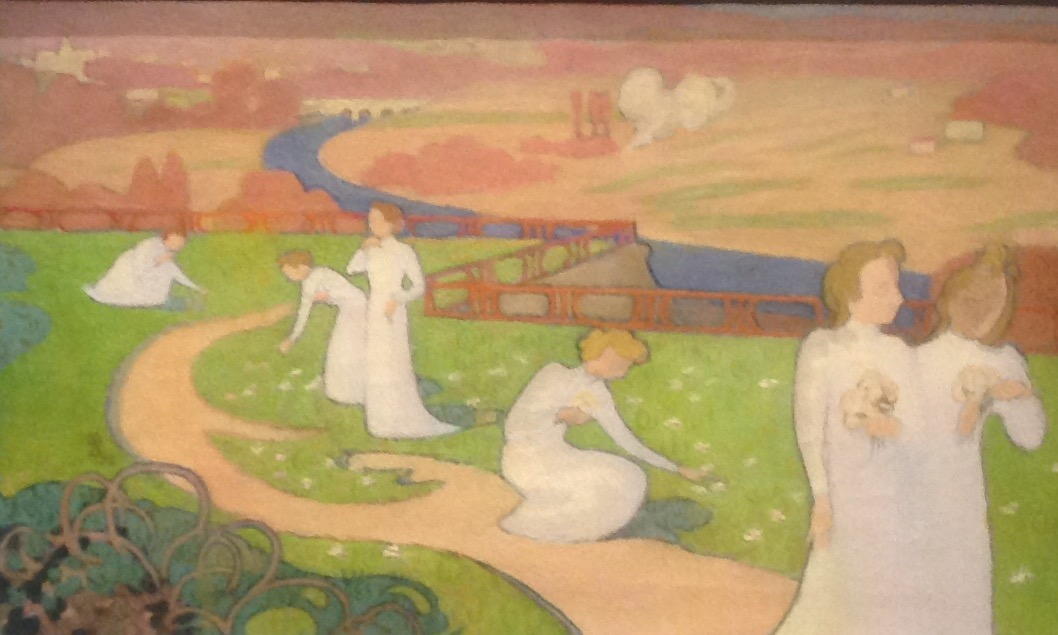
April or The Road of Life, one of four panels for the bedroom of a young girl (1892)

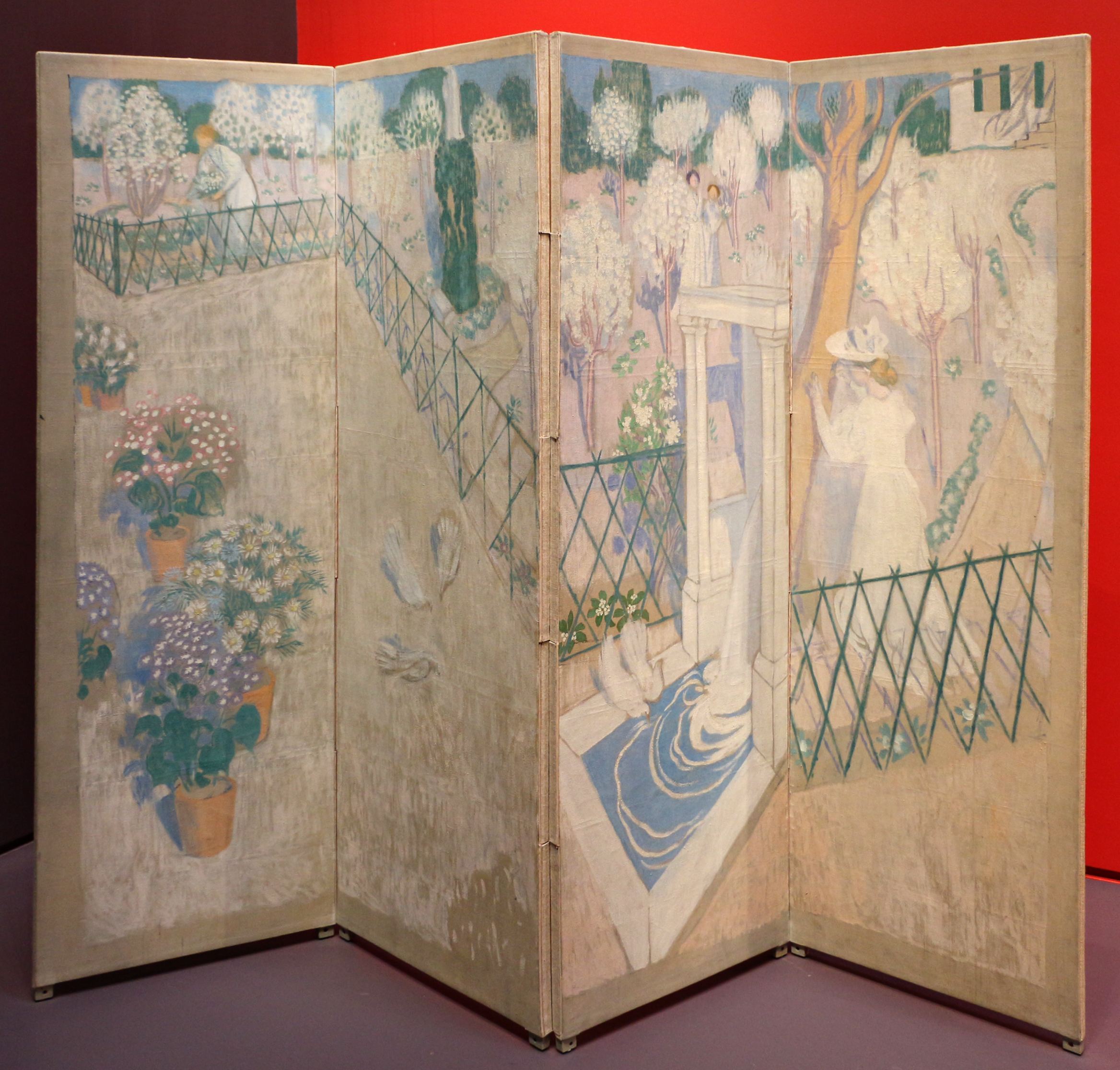
Painted screen with doves (1896), Musée d'Orsay

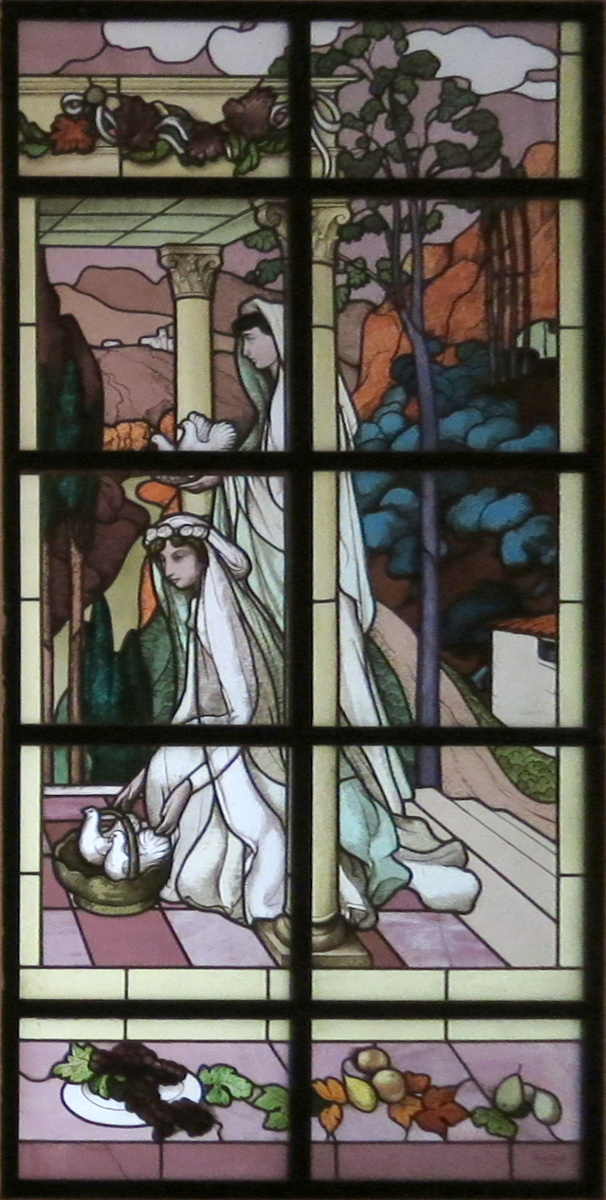
Stained glass window for private residence (1896)

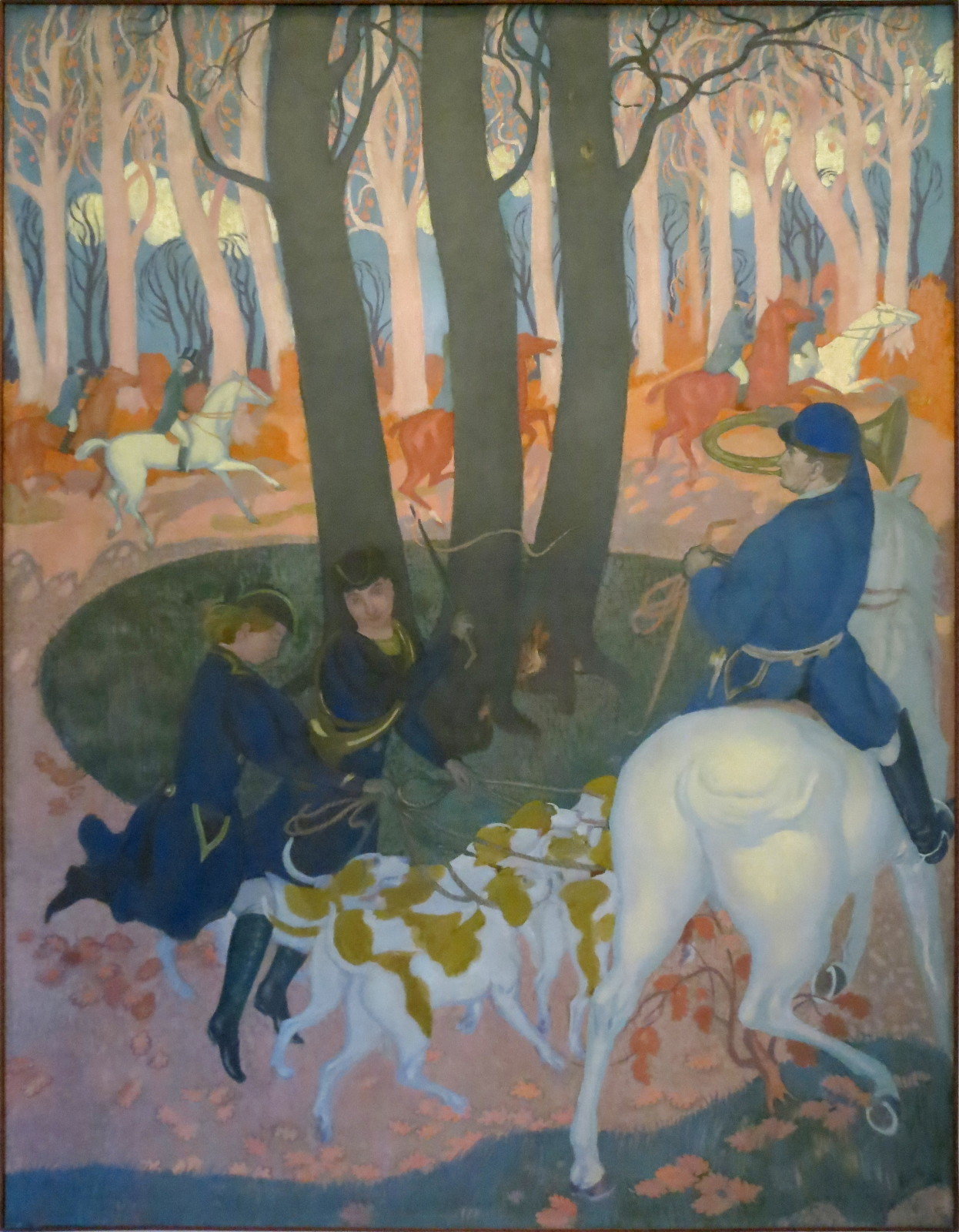
Second panel from The Legend of St. Hubert (1895–97)

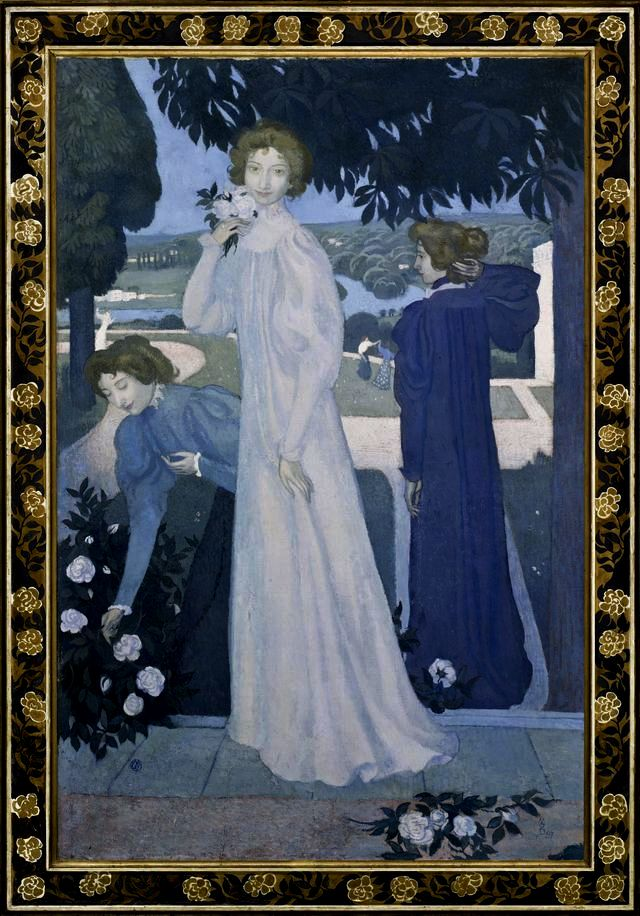
Portrait of Yvonne Lerolle in Three Aspects (1897)

In the mid-1890s, with the appearance of the Art Nouveau style in Brussels and Paris, Denis began to pay greater attention to the decorative arts, though his themes of family and spirituality remained the same. Many of his new projects were commissioned by Samuel Bing, the art dealer whose gallery gave its name to Art Nouveau. His new projects included designs wallpapers, stained glass, tapestries, lamp shades, screens, and fans. But while he worked within the time period and used the materials of the Art Nouveau, his themes and style remained distinctly his own.

Denis created a series of painted panels for the office of Baron Cochin called The Legend of St. Hubert, painted between 1895 and 1897. The work drew freely upon the Medici Chapel in Florence and the works of Nicolas Poussin, Delacroix, and Pierre Puvis de Chavannes. Cochin and his family appear in one panel, and Denis's wife Anne in another. The panels celebrated families and faith. The Archbishop of Paris celebrated a mass in the office, when the French government nationalized his residence and other church property in 1907.

He produced a small number of portraits, including an unusual portrait of Yvonne Lerolle (1897) which showed her in three different poses in the same picture.

=== Neo-classicism ===
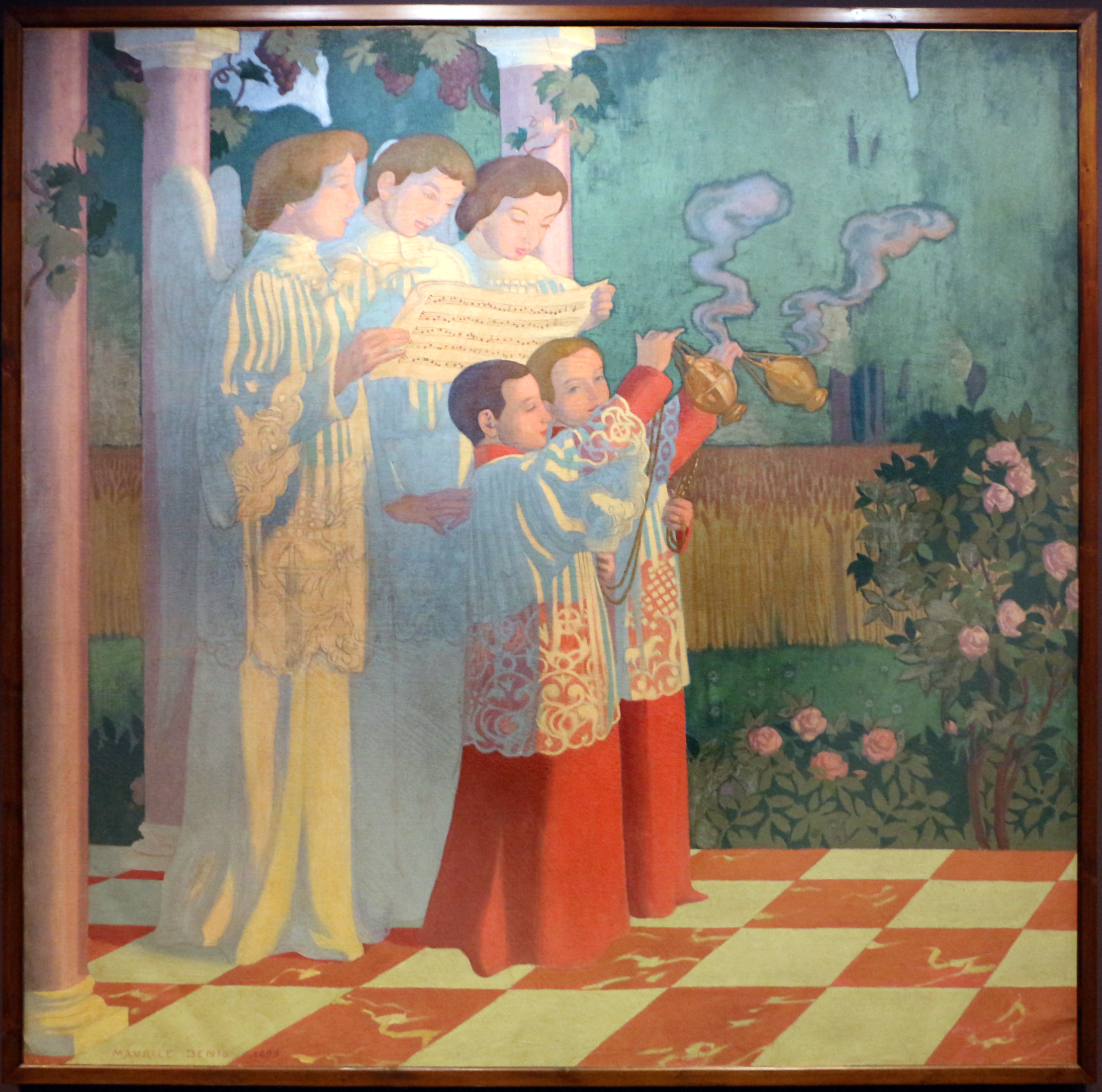
Decoration of the chapel of the College of the Holy Cross Vésinet: Exaltation of the Holy Cross and the glorification of the sacrifice of the Mass (1899)

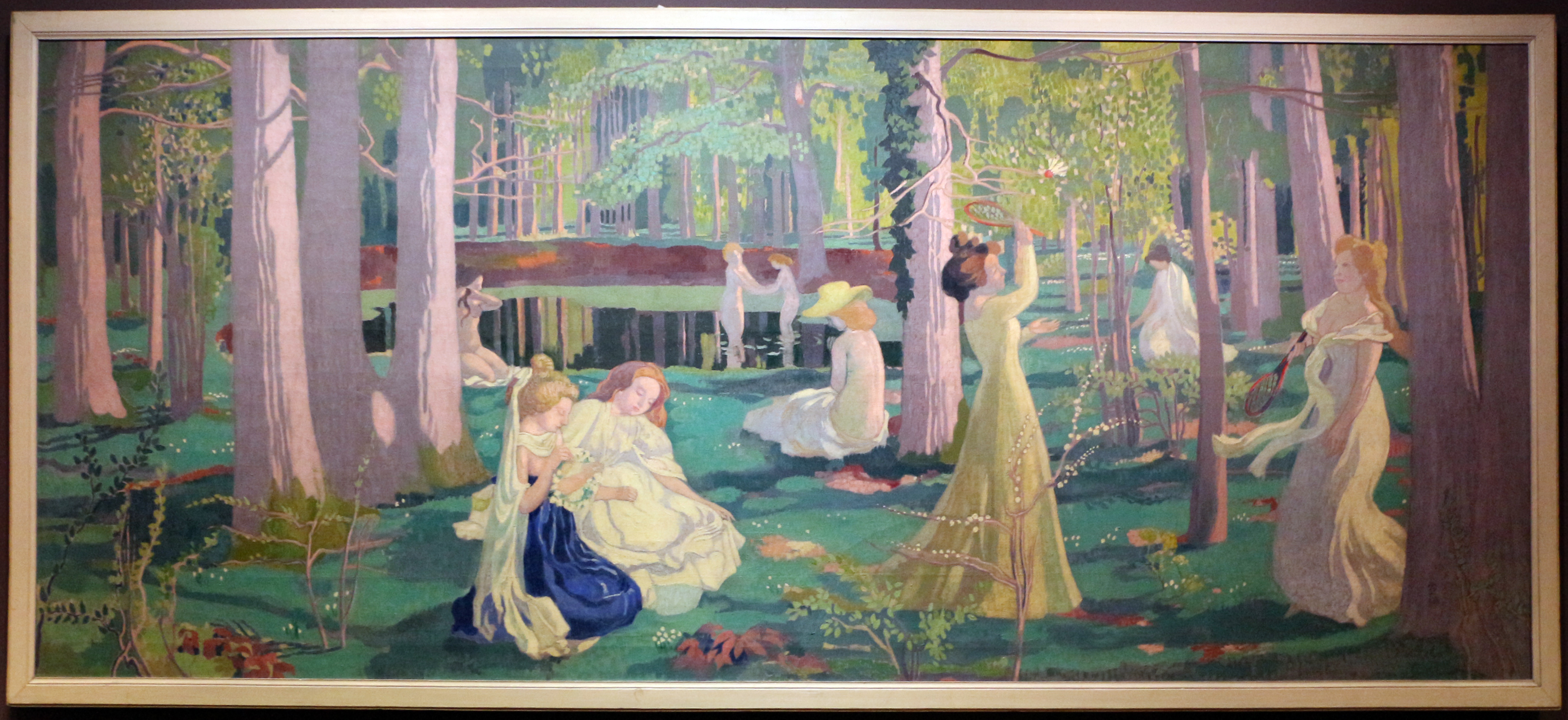
Gioco del volano, Racket game on a lawn (1900)

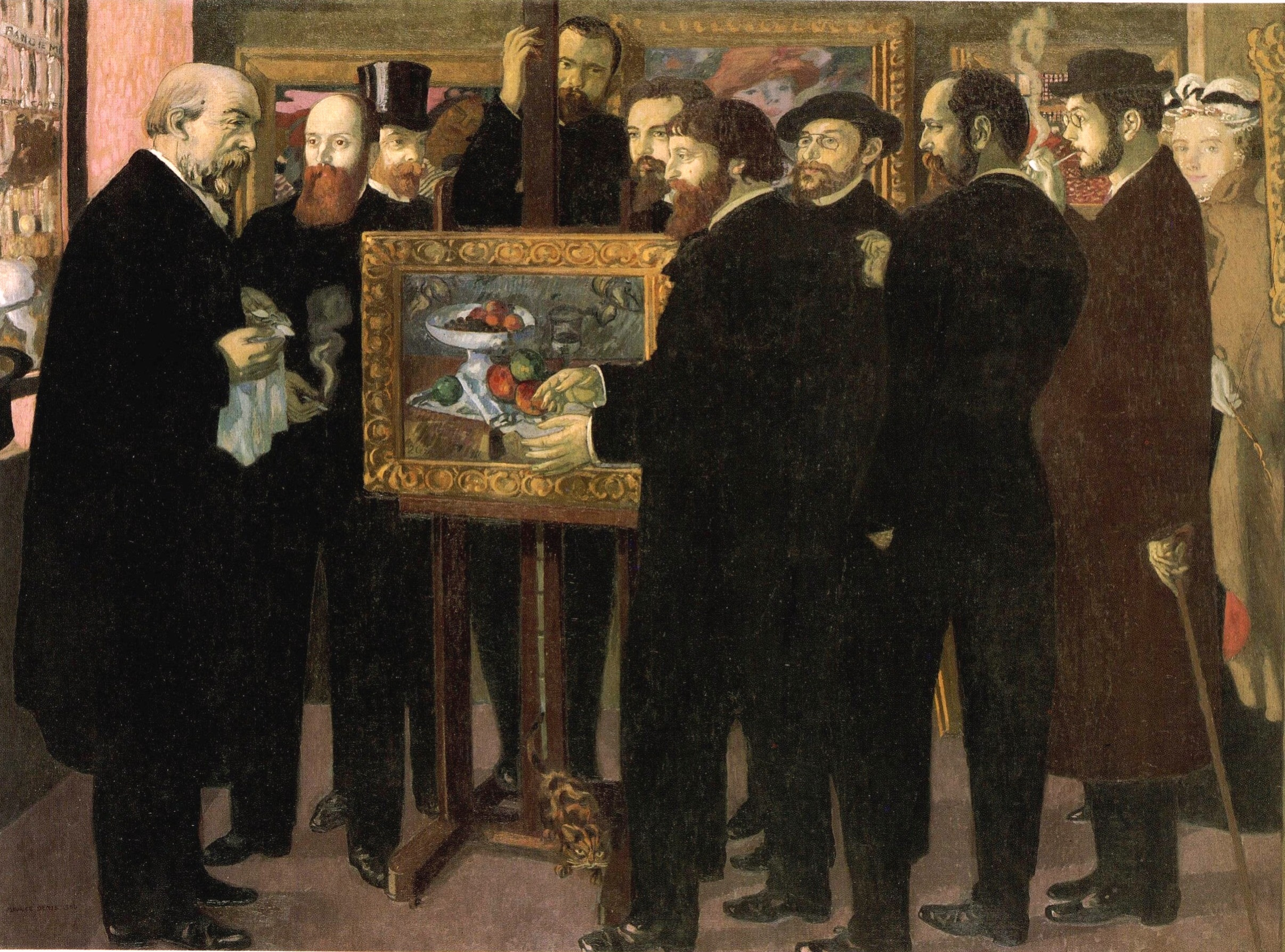
Homage to Cézanne (1900)

In January 1898, Denis made his first visit to Rome, where the works of Raphael and Michelangelo in the Vatican made a strong impression upon him. He wrote a long essay, Les Arts a Rome, declaring: "the classical aesthetic offers us at the same time a method of thinking and a method of wanting to be, a moral and at the same time a psychology...The classical tradition as a whole, by the logic of the effort and the greatness of results, is in some way parallel with the religious tradition of humanity." In the same year, the two leading figures of symbolism in art, Gustave Moreau and Puvis de Chavannes, died. On his return to Paris, Denis re-oriented his art toward neo-classicism, with clearer lines and figures. He noted in his journal in March 1898: "Think of late paintings where Christ is the central figure...Remember the large mosaics of Rome. Reconcile the employment of large-scale decorative means and the direct emotions of nature."

Denis was an admirer of Paul Cézanne; he traveled to Cézanne's home in 1896 and wrote an article that included Cézanne's remark: "I want to make of impressionism something solid and durable, like the art in museums." In the article, Denis described Cézanne as "the Poussin of impressionism" and called him the founder of modern neo-classicism. One of the most important works of Denis from this period is Homage to Cézanne (1900), painted following the death of his friend Paul Cézanne. In the foreground, it portrays the friends of Cézanne, several of them former Nabis; from left to right (Odilon Redon, Édouard Vuillard, the critic André Mellerio, Ambroise Vollard, Denis himself, Paul Sérusier, Paul Ranson, Ker-Xavier Roussel, Pierre Bonnard, and Denis's wife Marthe). The painting appears very somber because they are all dressed in black for mourning, but it also has a second message; the paintings displayed behind the figures and on the easel represent the transition of modern art, from works by Gauguin and Renoir on the back wall to the painting by Cézanne on the easel, which illustrated, from Denis's point of view, the transition from impressionism and symbolism toward neo-classicism.

Denis was affected by the political turmoils of the time, such as the Dreyfus affair (1894–1906) which divided French society and the art world with Émile Zola and André Gide on one side, defending Dreyfus, and Rodin, Renoir and Denis on the other. Denis was in Rome during most of the events, and it did not affect his friendship with Gide. More significant for him was the movement of the French government to reduce the power of the church, and the decision of the government to officially separate the church and state in 1905. Denis joined the nationalist and pro-Catholic Action Française in 1904, and remained a member until 1927, when the group had moved to the extreme right and was formally condemned by the Vatican.

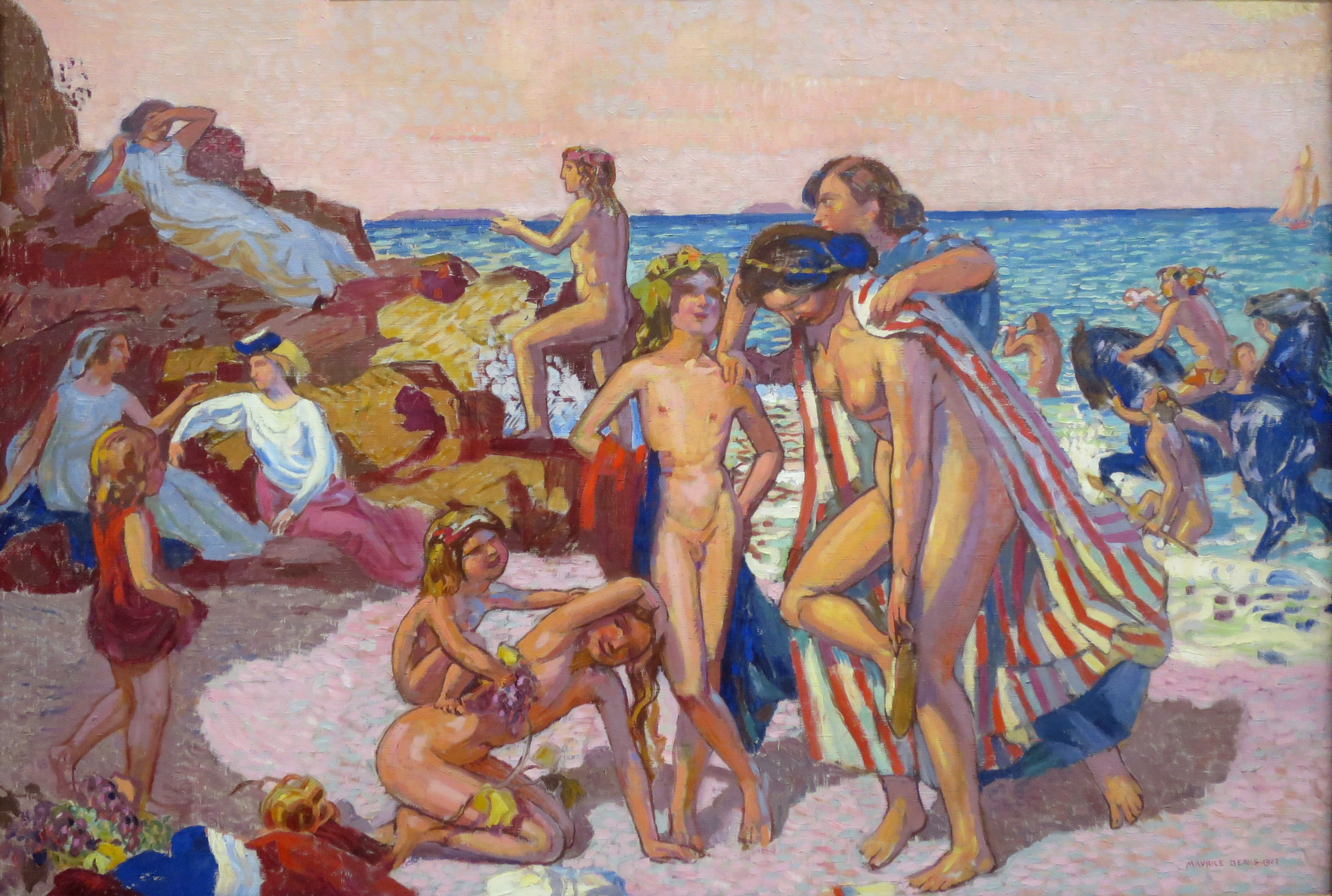
Bacchus and Ariadne (1907), the Hermitage

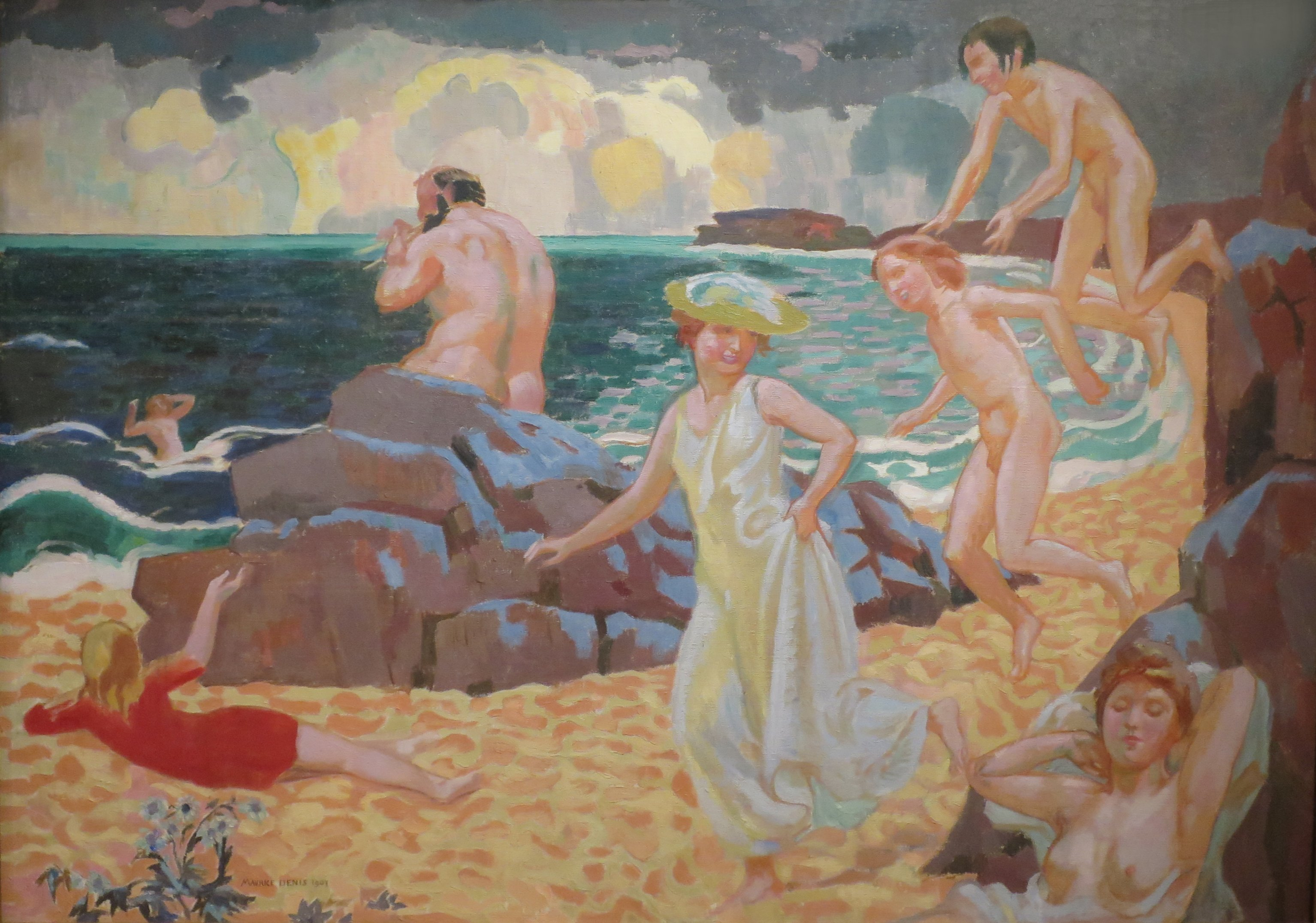
Polyphemus (1907), Pushkin Museum, Moscow

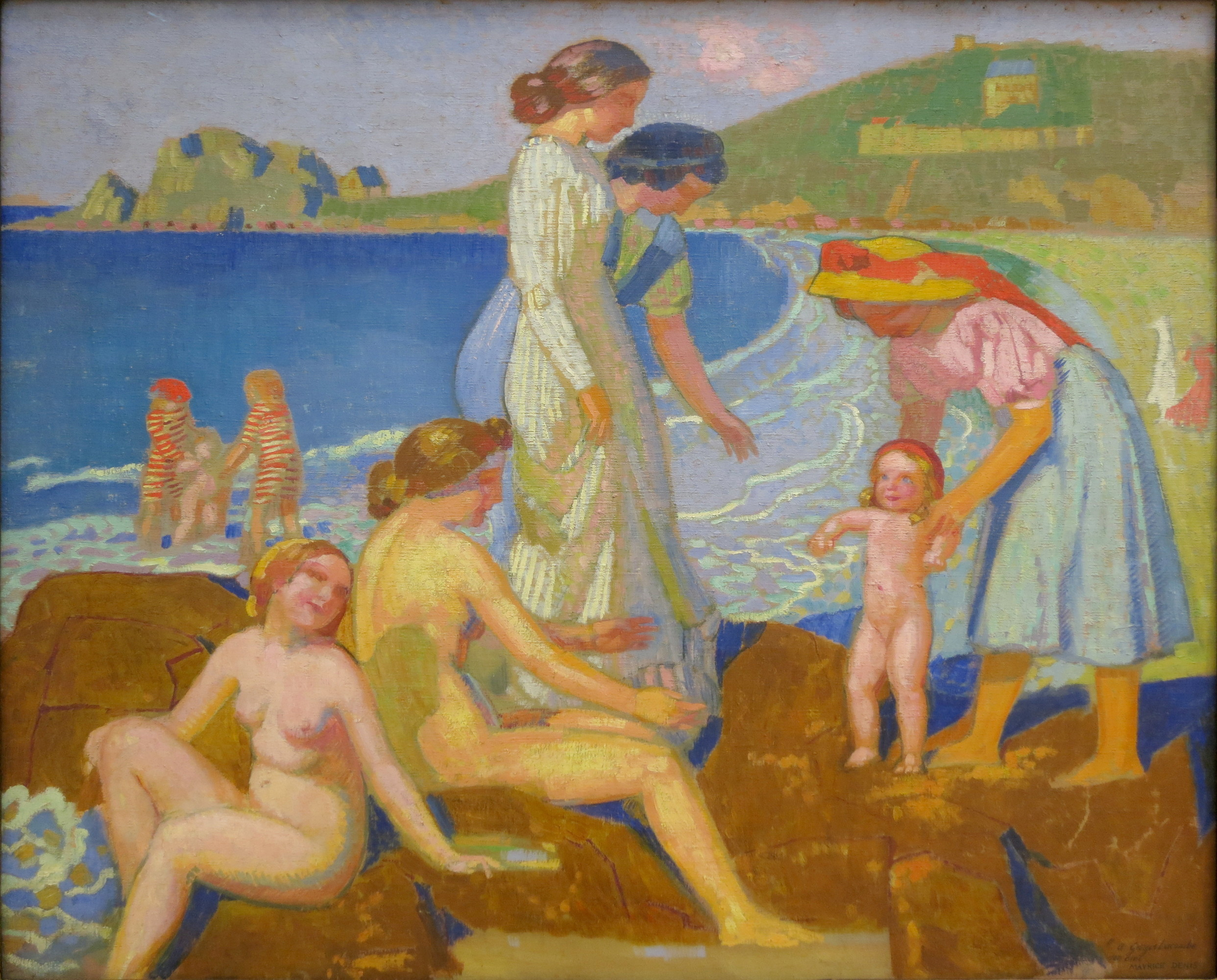
Bathers at Perros Guirec (1912)

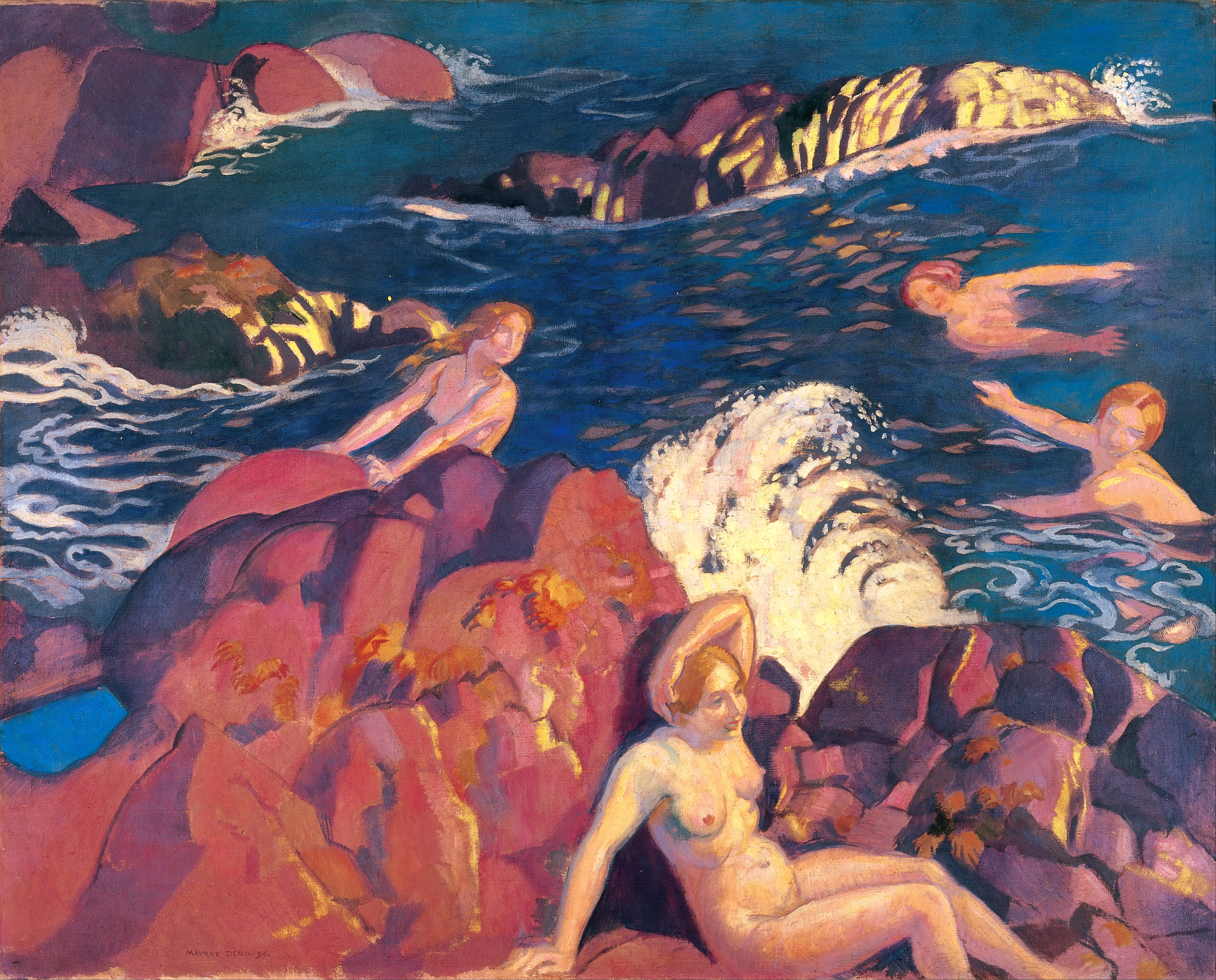
Wave (1916)

In response to Henri Matisse's La Joie de Vivre, Denis turned increasingly toward mythology and what he termed "Christian humanism". In 1898, he had bought a small villa at the beach in Perros-Guirec in Brittany, which was then a remote and little-populated fishing village. In 1907, he used the beach there as the setting for the neoclassical Bacchus and Ariadne, brightening his colors and showing a happy family romping nude on the beach. He followed this with a series of pictures of nudes at the beach or in bucolic settings, based on mythological themes.

=== Book design and illustration ===
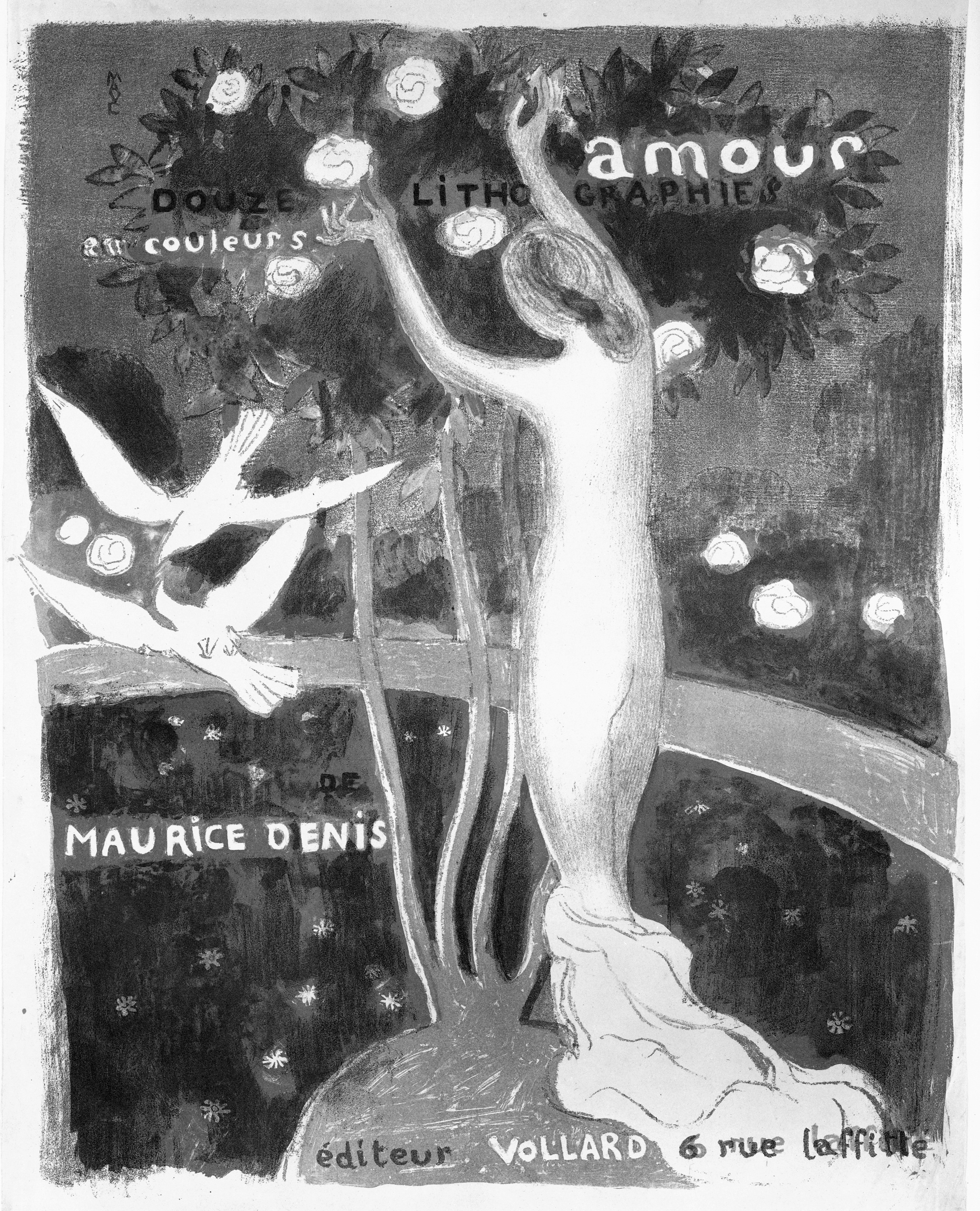
Frontispiece lithograph from the series Amour (1899)

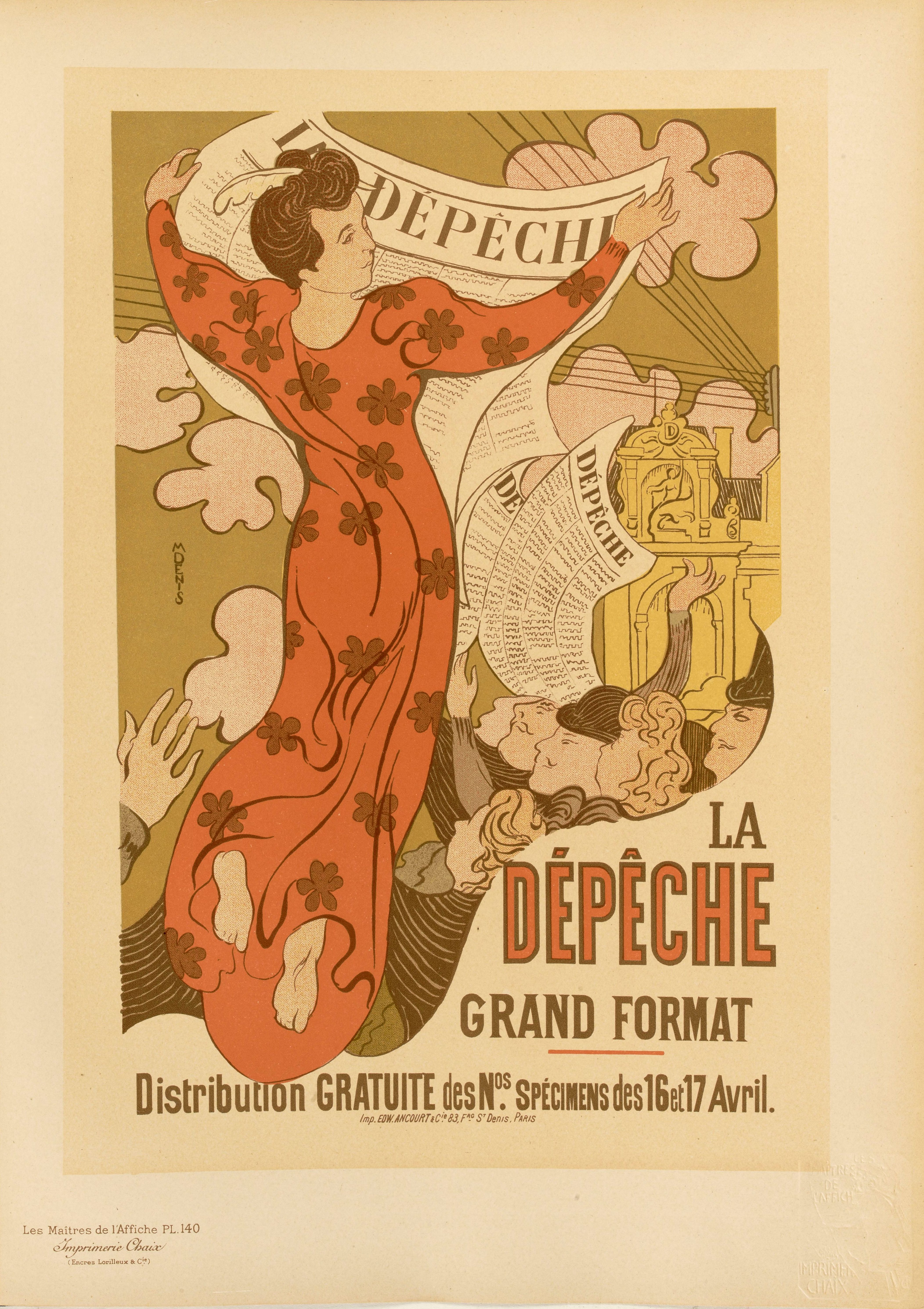
Poster published in Les Maîtres de l'Affiche

From 1899 to 1911 Denis was also busy with graphic arts. For the publisher Vollard he made a set of twelve color lithographs titled Amour, which was an artistic but not a commercial success. He then returned to making woodblock prints, doing a black-and-white series L'Imitation de Jesus-Christ, in collaboration with the engraver Tony Beltrand, which published in 1903, then illustrations for Sagesse by the poet Paul Verlaine, published in 1911. In 1911 he began work on illustrations for Fiorette by Saint Francis of Assisi. For this project he traveled alone by bicycle through Umbria and Tuscany, making drawings. The final work, published in 1913, was filled with rich and colorful floral illustration. He also made highly decorative book designs and illustrations for Vita Nova by Dante (1907) and twenty-four illustrations for Eloa by Alfred de Vigny (1917). The last work, made during the midst of the First World War was more somber than his earlier work, largely colored in pale blues an greys.

=== Architectural decoration ===
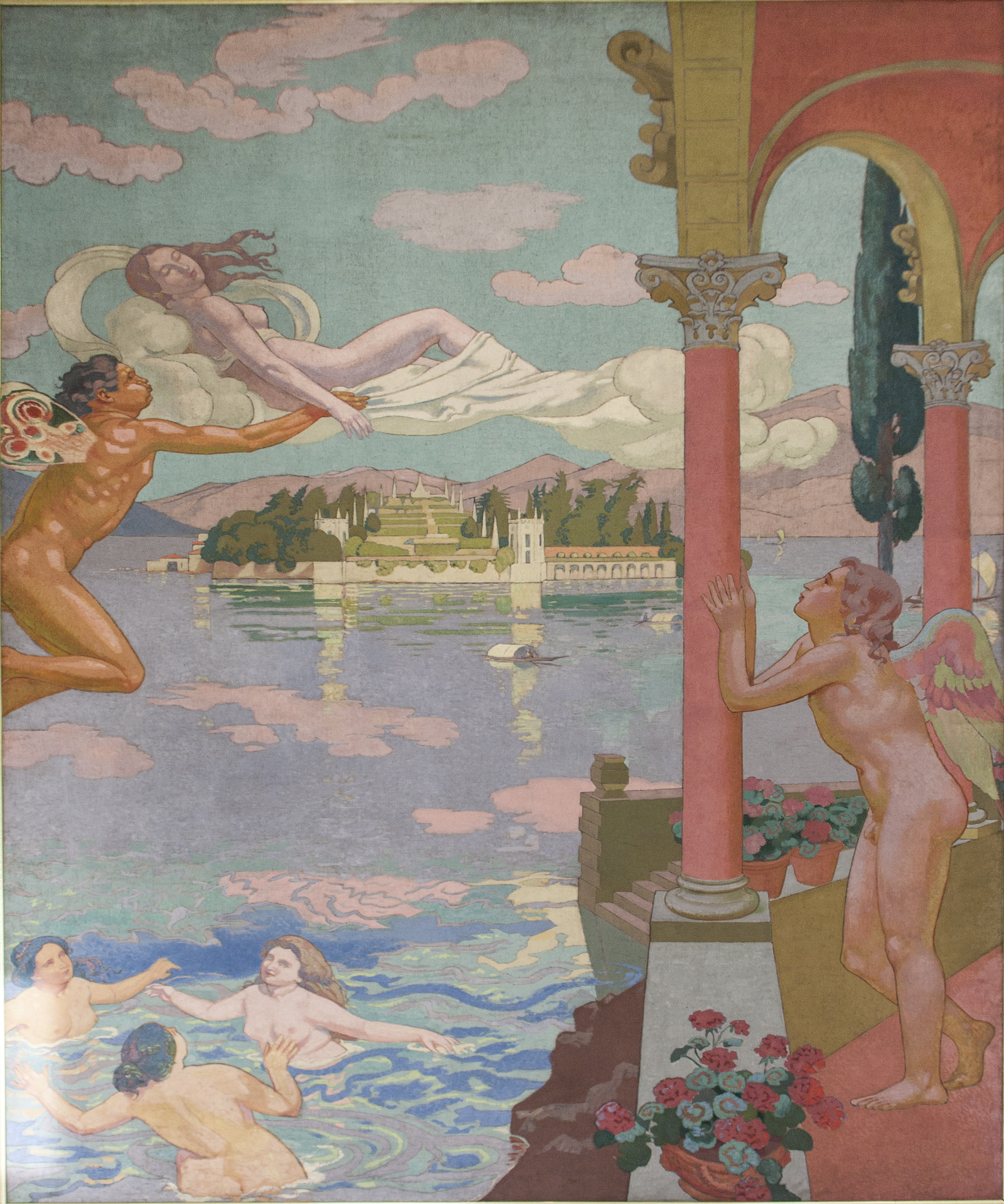
The Story of Psyche, panel for mansion of Ivan Morozov, Moscow (1908)

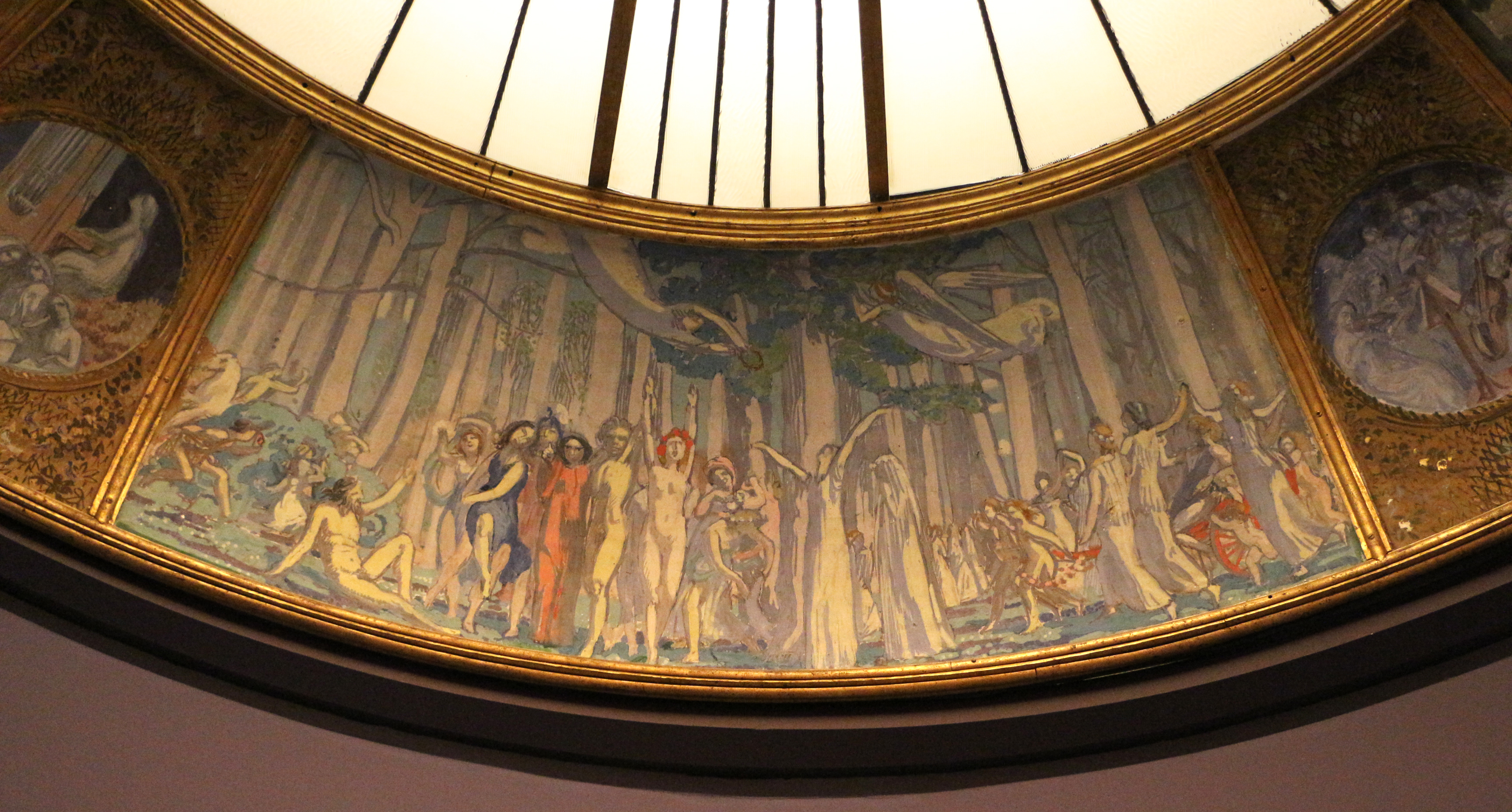
Portion of the mural for the cupola of the Théâtre des Champs-Élysées, Paris (1908–11)

In 1908 Denis began work on an important decorative project for the Russian art patron Ivan Morozov, who had been a major patron of Claude Monet and Auguste Renoir, and who owned The Night Café by Vincent van Gogh. Denis created a large mural panel, The history of Psyche, for the music room of Morozov's Moscow mansion, and later added some additional panels to the design. His fee for this project enabled him to buy his seaside house in Brittany. He then took on a more ambitious project, the cupola for a new theater, the Théâtre des Champs-Élysées, being constructed in Paris by the architect Auguste Perret. The theatre was modern; it was the first major building in Paris constructed of reinforced concrete, and is considered the first building in the Art Deco style; but Denis's work was purely neoclassical. The theme was the history of music, with figures of Apollo and the Muses. Perret constructed a special studio for Denis so he could paint a work of such a large scale.

=== Teaching and theory – "a new classical order" ===
Beginning in 1909, he taught painting at the Académie Ranson in Paris, where his students included Tamara de Lempicka. She later gave him credit for teaching her the craft technique of painting, though her art-deco style was quite different from his. He also devoted much of his time to writing about theory. In 1909 he published Théories, which brought together the articles he had written on art since 1890, describing the course of art from Gauguin to Matisse (whose work he disliked) to Cézanne and Maillol, under the subtitle: "From Symbolism and Gauguin towards a new classical order". The book was widely read, with three more editions published before 1920. It included his 1906 essay "The Sun", in which he described the decline of impressionism: "The common error of us all was to search above all for the light. It would have been better first to search for the Kingdom of God and his justice, that is to say for the expression of our spirit in beauty, and the rest would have arrived naturally." It also included his idea that "Art is the sanctification of the nature, of that nature found in everyone who is content to live." And it described his theory of creation that found the source for art in the character of the painter: "That which creates a work of art is the power and the will of the artist."

Subjects of his mature works included landscapes and figure studies, particularly of mother and child. But his primary interestDenis responded in 1907, with the neoclassical Bacchus and Ariadne, brightening his colors and showing a happy family romping nude but more modestly on a beach. He painted a series of works of nudes at the beach, an homage to the bathers of Raphael and the classical nudity of the Venus de Milo and other Greek sculpture. remained the painting of religious subjects, like "The dignity of labour", commissioned in 1931 by the International Federation of Christian Trade Unions to decorate the main staircase of the Centre William Rappard.

=== Church windows and decoration ===
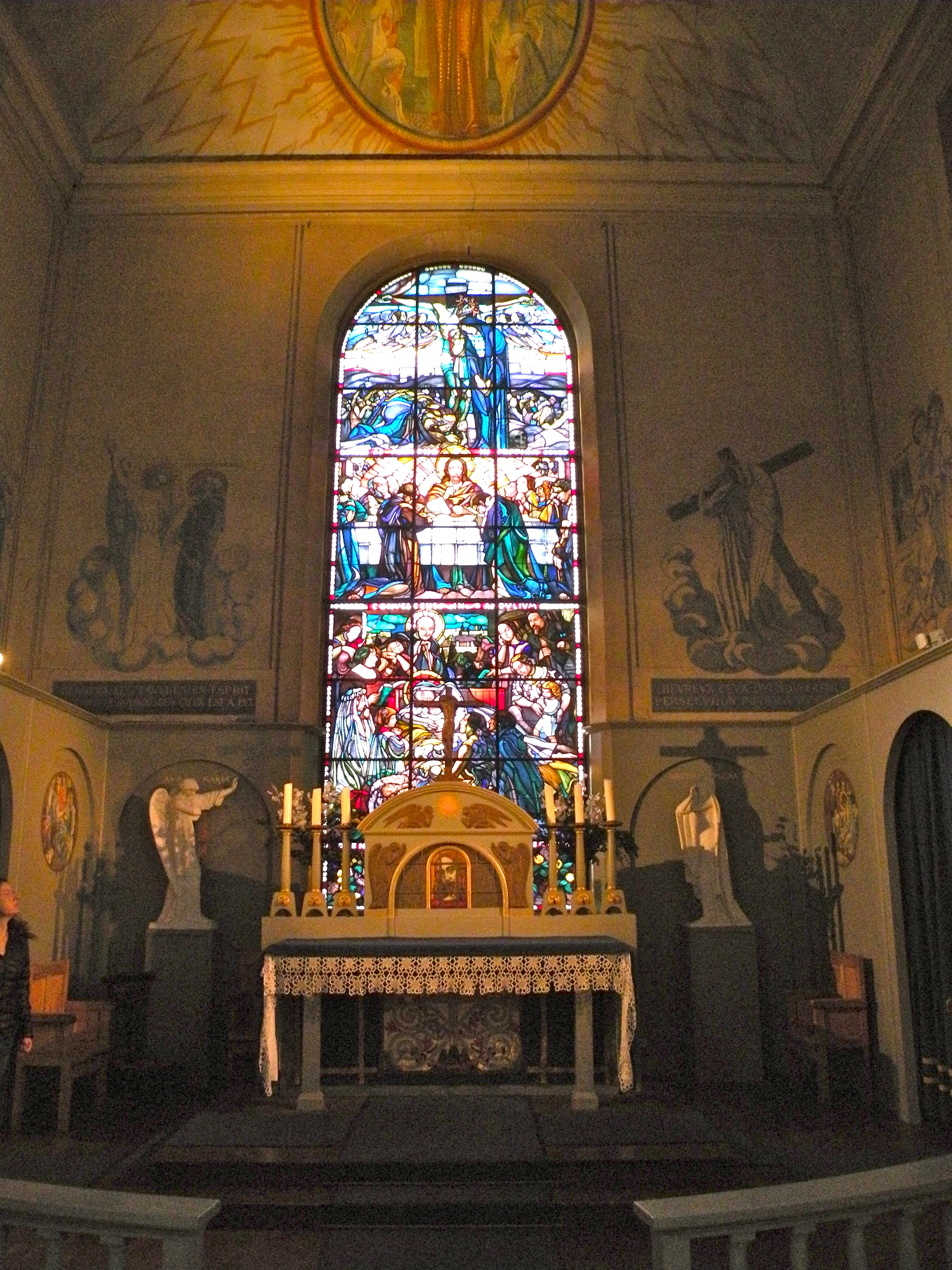
Chapel of the Priory, Saint-Germain-en-Laye (1915-1928)

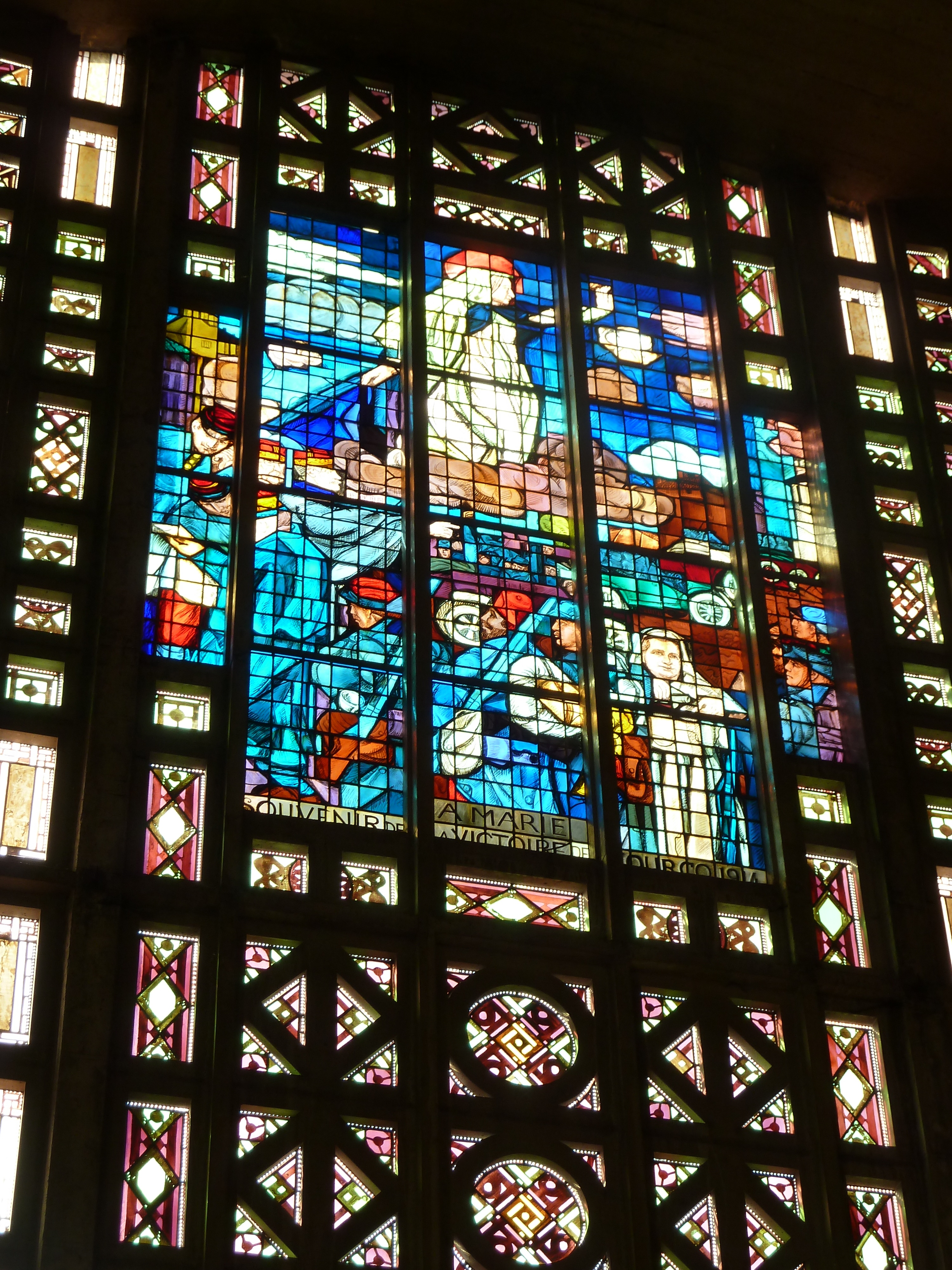
Window of the Church of Notre-Dame du Raincy

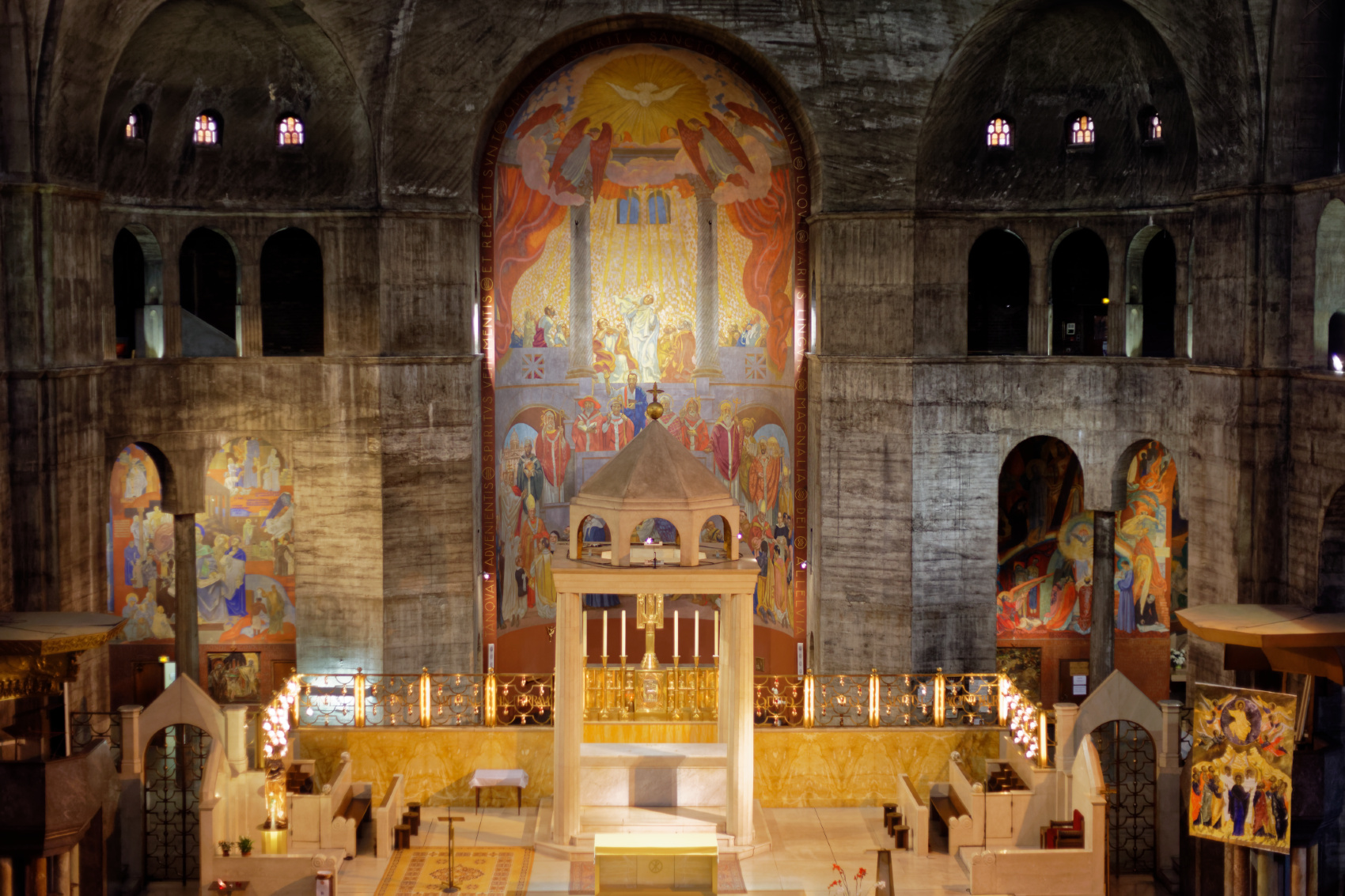
Altarpiece of the Église du Saint-Esprit in Paris

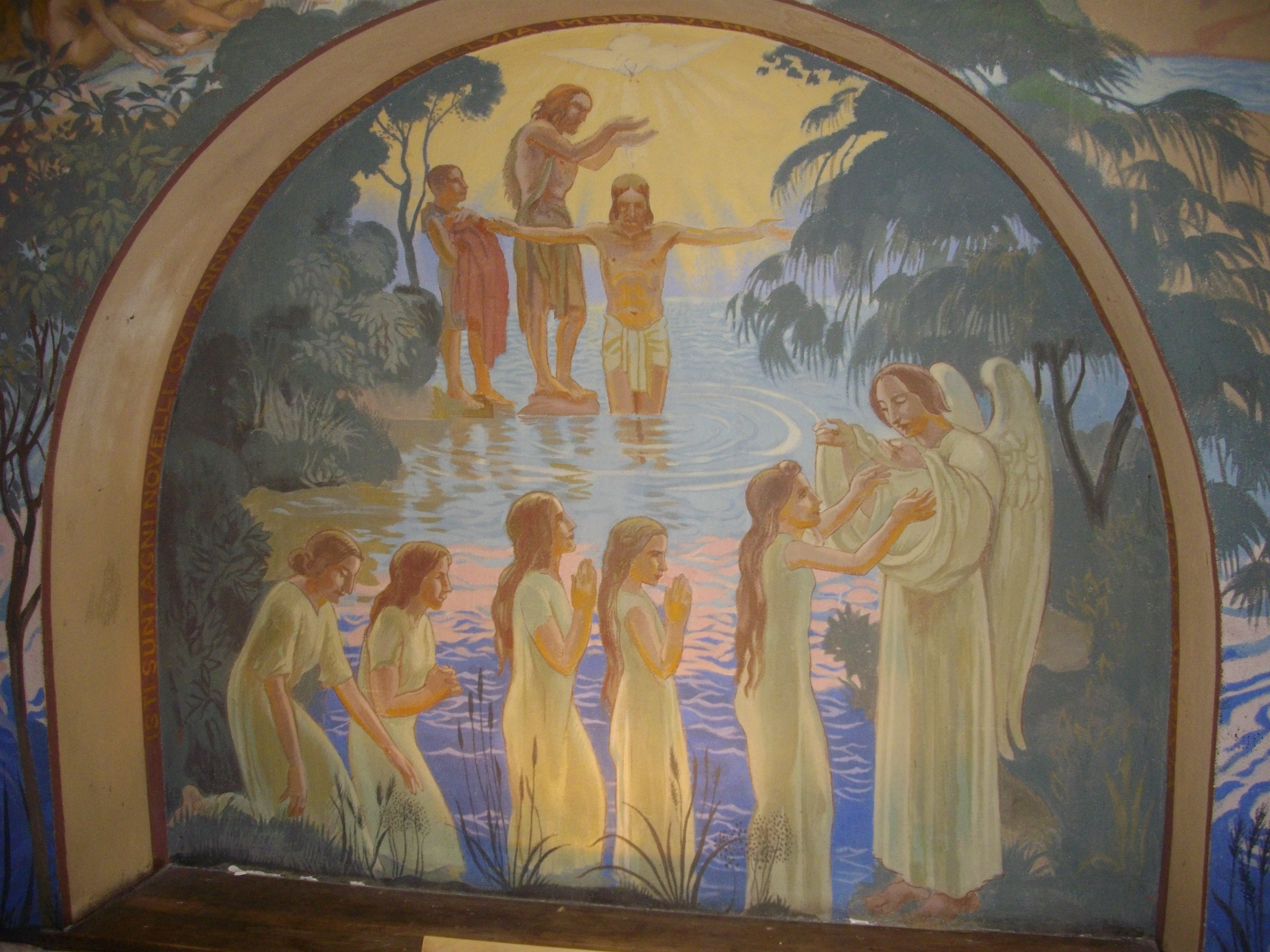
Mural from the Church of Saint-Nicaise. Reims

In the last period of his life and work he turned his attention more and more to large-scale murals and to religious art. In 1914 Denis purchased the former hospital of Saint-Germaine-en-Laye, constructed under Louis XIV in the 17th century. He renamed the building "The Priory" and Between 1915 and 1928, with the aid of the architect Auguste Perret, he decorated the building, particularly the unfinished chapel, which he filled with his own designs of frescos, stained glass, statues and furniture. In 1916 declared his intention to aim for the "supreme goal of painting, which is the large-scale decorative mural." he completed twenty murals between 1916 and his death in 1943.

Besides the Priory, his other major works of this period include the decoration of the Church of Notre-Dame du Raincy, an innovative reinforced concrete art deco church in the Paris suburbs designed by Auguste Perret, which was completed in 1924. The church was designed in the spirit of Sainte-Chapelle in Paris, to give the stained glass the maximum effect. The windows were made in collaboration with the stained-glass artist Marguerite Huré; Denis designed the figurative art in the center of each window, while Marguerite Huré created the window and the abstract glass designs around it. Other major religious works include the chapel Church of Saint-Louis in Vincennes (1927), the windows of the chapel of La Clarté in Perros (1931) and the church of Thonon his final project before his death in 1943.

On 5 February 1919, shortly after the First World War, Denis and George Desvallières founded the Ateliers d'Art Sacré, or workshops of Sacred art (1914–1918), as part of a broad movement in Europe to reconcile the church with modern civilization. The Ateliers created art for churches, particularly those devastated by the recent war. Denis said that he was against academic art because it sacrificed emotion to convention and artifice, and was against realism because it was prose and he wanted music. Above all he wanted beauty, which was an attribute of divinity.

The most important church decorated by the Ateliers was the Église du Saint-Esprit in Paris, finished in 1934. The murals and frescoes in the interior were painted by George Desvallières, Robert Poughéon, Nicolas Untersteller and Elizabeth Branly.The church was decorated by members of the Ateliers d'Art Sacré, showing the history of the church militant and the history of the church triumphant from the 2nd to the 20th century. To ensure unity in the decorations the architect imposed a standard height for all the people depicted, and red as the color of all the backgrounds. The central theme of the paintings is "the history of the church militant and the history of the church triumphant from the 2nd to the 20th century. Denis painted two of the major works, the Altarpiece and another large work beside it. The church murals that he painted were strongly influenced by the Renaissance art he had seen in churches in Italy, particularly the work of Giotto and Michelangelo. He wrote in 1922, "The sublime is to approach the subject or wall with an attitude that is grand, noble, and in no way petty."

=== Civic murals ===
In the late 1920s and 1930s, his prestige was such that he received commissions for a number of murals for important civic buildings. These included the ceiling over the stairway of the French Senate in the Luxembourg Palace; and murals for the Hospice of the city of Saint-Étienne, where he returned to the colorful and neoclassical themes of his beach paintings. He was commissioned to make two mural panels for the Palais de Chaillot, built for the 1937 Paris International Exposition. Denis invited several friends from his earlier career, Pierre Bonnard, Édouard Vuillard and Roussel, to participate in the project with him. The two panels celebrate sacred music and profane (non religious music) in a colorful neoclassical style, recalling his decoration for the cupola of the Théâtre des Champs-Élysées. The classical panel shows an ancient celebration in the Boboli Gardens in Rome, which he had recently visited. The paintings can still be seen though they have been somewhat disfigured by later renovations.

In his later years, he also had two important commissions outside of France, both on his favorite theme of Christian faith and humanism; the first, in 1931, for the Offices of the International Labor Bureau in Geneva, commissioned by the International Association of Christian Workers in Geneva on the theme "Christ preaching to the workers"; and the second, in 1938, for the new headquarters of the League of Nations. on the theme of being armed for peace, depicting a figure of Orpheus taming the tiger of war.

=== Later life ===
In January 1940, Denis summarized his accomplishments in his journal: "My marriage: Delacroix admired and understood; Ingres abandoned; break with the extremists. I have become official while at the same time cultivating the secret inquietude of an art which expresses my vision and my thought, while at the same time forcing me to better realize the lessons of the masters." Denis died in Paris of injuries resulting from an automobile accident in November 1943. The date of his death is variously listed as the 2nd, 3rd, or 13th.

== Personal life ==
Denis married his first wife, Marthe Meurier, in 1893. They had seven children, and she posed for numerous Denis works. Following her death in 1919, Denis painted a chapel dedicated to her memory. He married again on 22 February 1922 to Elisabeth Graterolleore, whom he had used a model for one of the figures in the cupola of the Théâtre des Champs-Élysées. They had two children, Jean-Baptiste (born 1923) and Pauline (born 1925). Elisabeth also features in several paintings of Denis, sometimes alongside Marthe.

He was very active in the Roman Catholic Church as a Tertiary, or member of a lay religious order. In 1907 he joined the traditionalist and nationalist Action Française movement, but he left in 1927 after the group had moved to the extreme right and was condemned by the Vatican. During World War II, he firmly rejected the Vichy government.

== Quotations about art ==
The published writings and the private journal of Denis give an extensive view of his philosophy of art, which he developed over his lifetime.

"Remember that a picture, before being a battle horse, a female nude or some sort of anecdote, is essentially a flat surface covered with colors assembled in a certain order." (Art et Critique August 1890)

"Art remains a sure refuge, the hope of a reason for our life here, and this consoling thought that a little beauty is also found in our life, and that we are continuing the work of creation....the labor of art has merit; to inscribe the marvelous beauty of flowers, of the light, of the proportion of trees and the form of waves, and the perfection of face, to inscribe our poor and lamentable life of suffering, of hope and of thought." (Journal, 24 March 1895)

"Decorative and edifying. That is what I want art to be before anything else." (Nouvelles Théories (1922)

"Painting is first of all the art of imitation, and not the servant of some imaginary 'purity'". (Nouvelles Théories (1922)

"Don't lose sight of the essential objectives of painting, which are expression, emotion, delectation; to understand the means, to paint decoratively, to exalt form and color." (Journal, 1930)

== Exhibitions ==
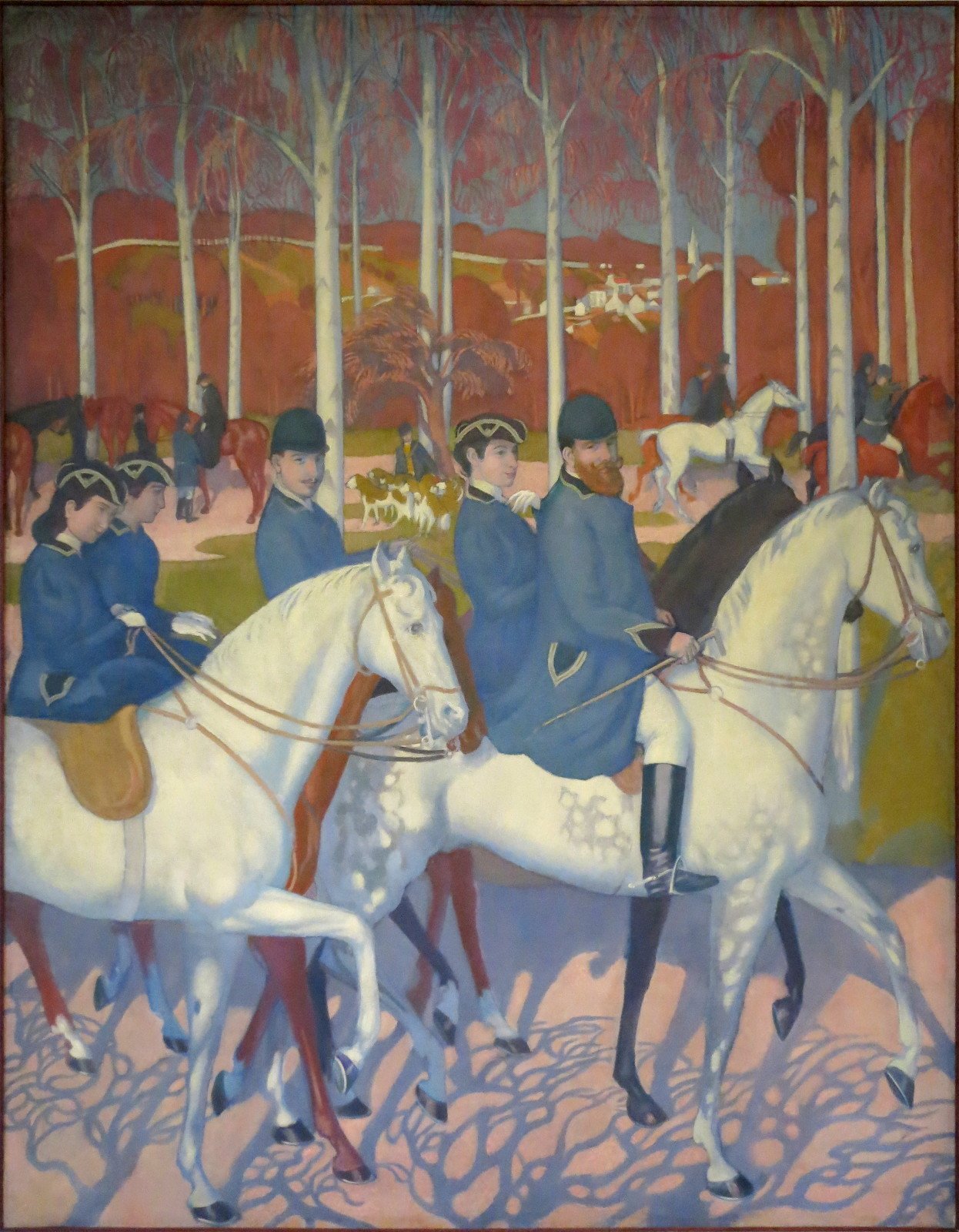
Maurice Denis, La Légende de St Hubert

- 1963 From 28 June to 29 September 1963, at the Musée Toulouse-Lautrec, Albi. Paintings, water-colours, drawings, lithographs, with an introduction by Agnès Humbert
- 1980 The Maurice Denis Museum was opened in the artist's home in the Parisian suburb of Saint-Germain-en-Laye.
- 1995 A major retrospective exhibition took place in 1995 at the UK's Walker Art Gallery in Liverpool.
- 2007 A similar exhibition was mounted at the Musée Des Beaux Arts de Montréal in 2007; it was the first major Denis show in North America.
- 2021 Private Lives: Home and Family in the Art of the Nabis, Paris, 1889–1900 featuring the work of Pierre Bonnard, Édouard Vuillard, Maurice Denis, and Félix Vallotton exhibited at the Portland Art Museum and the Cleveland Museum of Art.

== Collection ==
Denis's work is in the following collections:

- Art Institute of Chicago
- Cleveland Museum of Art
- Museum of Fine Arts, Boston
- Metropolitan Museum of Art
- Museum of Modern Art
- National Gallery of Art
- Stanley Museum

== Looting and restitution ==
In 2023 Denis's Stehender Knabe unter einem Baum, which had been listed on the German Lost Art Foundation website, was found by family of Holocaust victim Marcel Monteux, from whom it had been looted.

== See also ==
- Henry Lerolle, patron

== Bibliography ==
- Bouillon, Jean-Paul (2006). Maurice Denis – Le spirituel dans l'art (in French). Paris: Gallimard. ISBN 2-07-031929-6.
