= Homage to Cézanne =

Painting by Maurice Denis

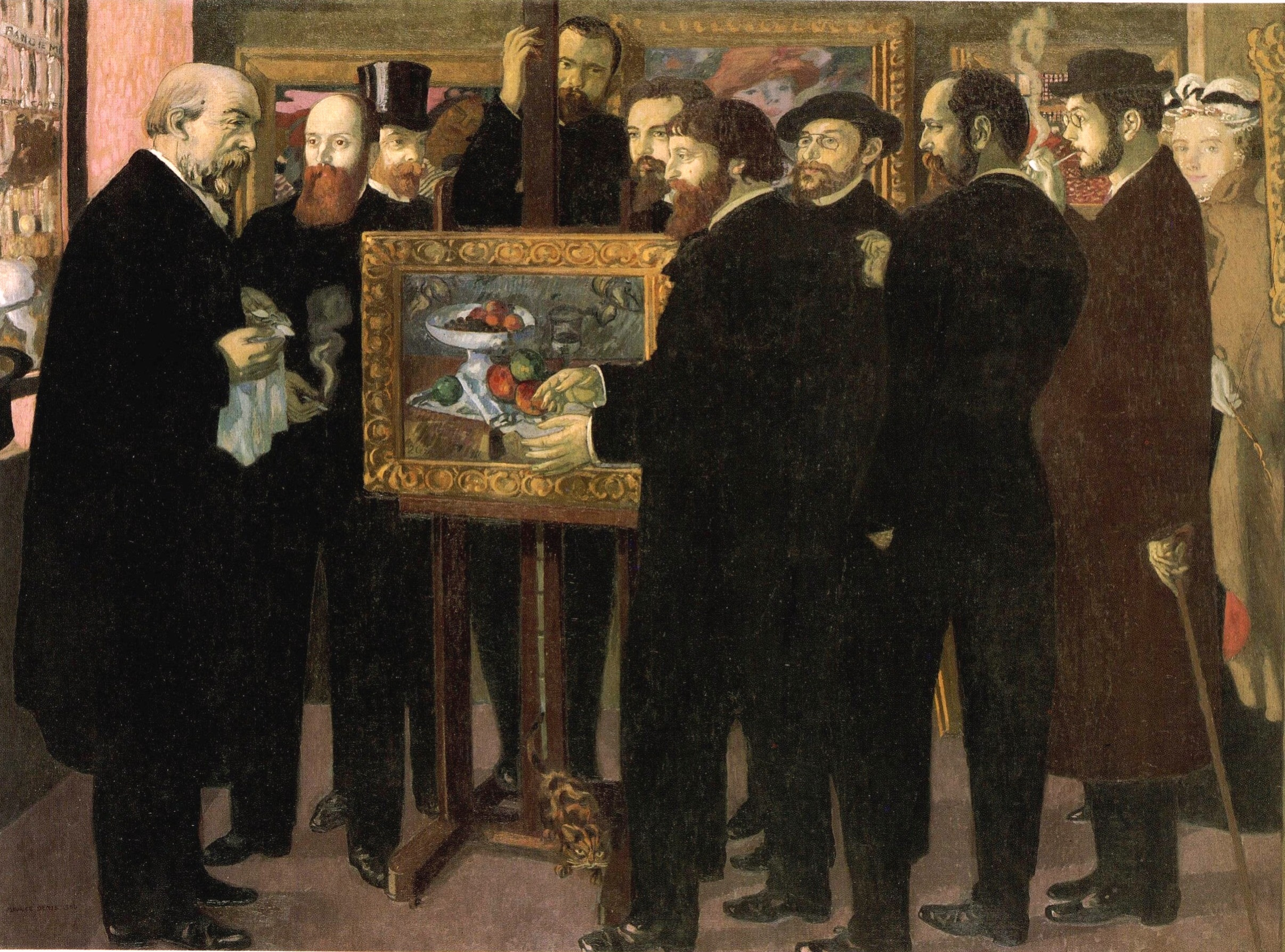
- Artist: Maurice Denis
- Year: 1900
- Medium: oil on canvas
- Dimensions: 182 cm × 243.5 cm (72 in × 95.9 in)
- Location: Musée d'Orsay; Paris

Homage to Cézanne (French: Hommage à Cézanne) is a painting in oil on canvas by the French artist Maurice Denis dating from 1900. It depicts a number of key figures from the once secret brotherhood of Les Nabis (Hebr. the Prophets). The painting is a retrospective; by 1900 the group was breaking up as its members matured.

== Subject matter and composition ==
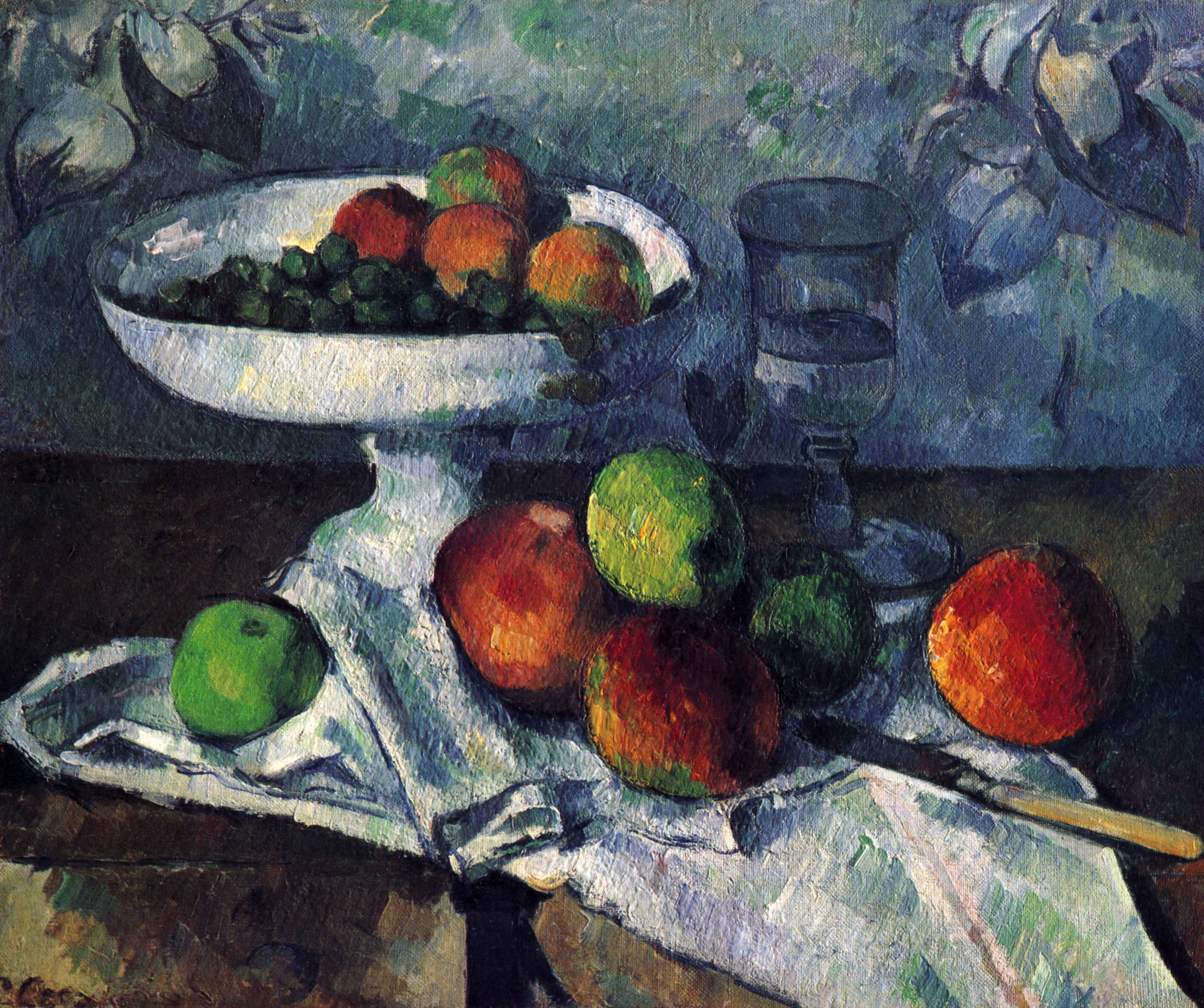
Fruit Bowl, Glass and Apples, Paul Cézanne, 1879–80. Oil on canvas. Museum of Modern Art, New York. This is the work that is the centrepiece of Denis's painting.

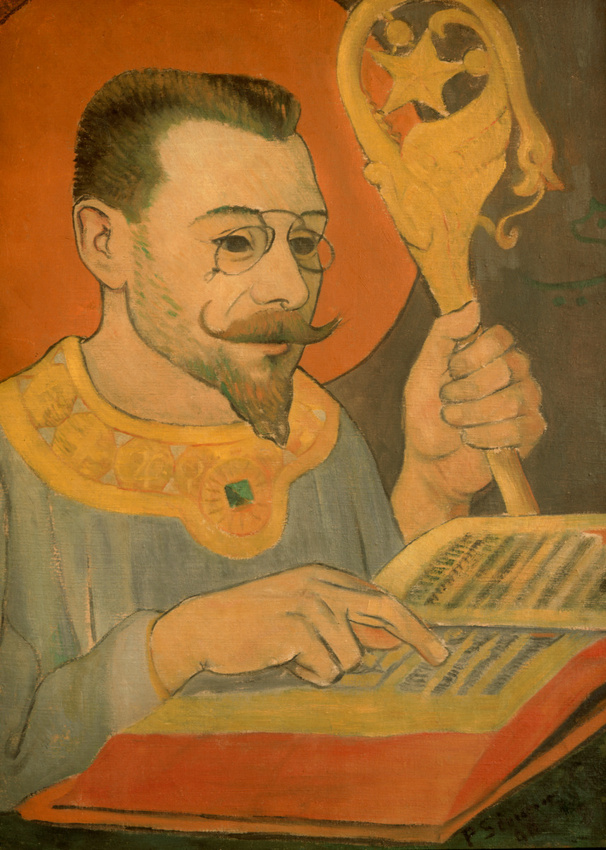
Paul Ranson in Nabi Costume, Paul Sérusier, 1890. Oil on canvas. Musée d'Orsay, Paris.

In this painting, Maurice Denis has gathered a group of friends, artists and critics to celebrate Paul Cézanne, who is represented by his still life Fruit Bowl, Glass and Apples of 1879–80 on an easel in the centre of the painting. The scene is the shop of the art dealer Ambroise Vollard in the Rue Laffitte. The Cézanne painting had belonged to Paul Gauguin who is thus evoked, despite not being pictured, having left France permanently in 1895 for the South Seas. Gauguin described the Cézanne as "an exceptional pearl, the apple of my eye." Works by Gauguin and Renoir can be seen in the background.

Pictured are many of the key figures from the secret brotherhood of the Nabis, for whom Gauguin was the principal mentor. Included are the symbolist painter Odilon Redon, the focus of attention on the far left, Paul Sérusier (Nabi instigator) centre talking to Redon, and at the back, left to right, Édouard Vuillard, the critic André Mellerio wearing a top hat, Ambroise Vollard behind the easel, Maurice Denis, Paul Ranson, Ker-Xavier Roussel, Pierre Bonnard with a pipe, and on the far right Marthe Denis, Maurice's wife.

In some ways different from the others, Redon is the group's revered senior figure. Sérusier appears to be explaining to Redon why the Nabis like Cézanne based on his posture. Over time, Redon had come to be more closely associated with Cézanne than with Symbolist fellow traveller Gustave Moreau. Redon's inclusion in the picture is not surprising; Denis was a fan of Redon and once remarked "the lesson of Redon is his powerlessness to paint anything which is not representative of a state of soul, which does not express some depth of emotion, which does not translate an interior vision."

The picture is almost life size at 180 cm high and 240 cm broad, which enhances its impact. The composition has strong verticals in the erect poses of the subjects, the easel and the walking stick, against which the brightly coloured rectangle of the framed still life is contrasted. The scene is crowded. Vollard is grasping the easel which is bursting out of the top edge of the painting, and the figures fully occupy the space of the canvas, leaving little room for anything else. Mrs Denis is reduced to peering over Bonnard's shoulder. Contrasting the strong verticals, the heads of the group provide a horizontal rhythm to the work. The conservative black suits belie the avant-garde reputation of the Nabis.

== Significance ==
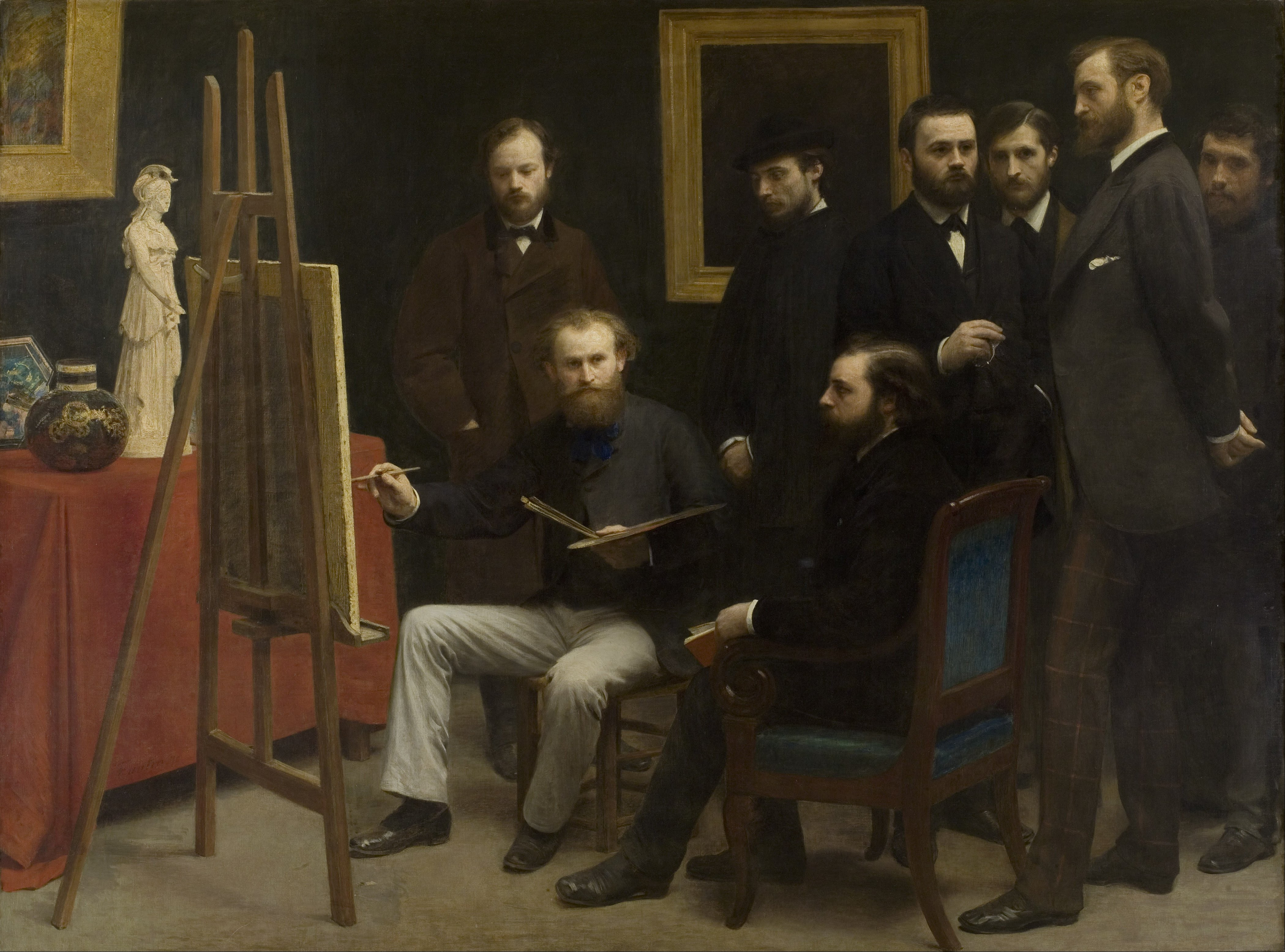
A Studio at Les Batignolles, Henri Fantin-Latour, 1870. Musée d'Orsay, Paris. A possible antecedent for Homage to Cézanne.

Belinda Thomson described Homage to Cézanne as Denis "turning away from the more spectacular, subjective Symbolism of Gauguin and van Gogh towards what he saw as the reassertion of classical values in Cézanne." Denis had visited Rome with Gide in 1898 where he had discovered a renewed interest in classicism. He subsequently published articles such as "Cézanne" in 1907 and "De Gauguin et de Van Gogh au classicisme" in 1909 which argued that classicism was at the core of French cultural tradition. By doing so, he influenced a new generation of French artists.

A possible antecedent for the work is A Studio at Les Batignolles (1870) by Henri Fantin-Latour, which features, amongst others, Édouard Manet, Pierre-Auguste Renoir, Émile Zola and Claude Monet.

== Exhibitions ==
Homage to Cézanne was shown at the Salon de la Société nationale des beaux-arts, Paris, 1901, and the Salon de la Libre Esthétique, Brussels, Belgium, 1901. It was not shown again in an exhibition until 1948. Reactions in 1901 were mixed. Denis referred to the work in his diary as "that painting, which still makes the public laugh".

== History ==
Homage to Cézanne was in the collection of the writer André Gide who donated it to the Musée du Luxembourg in 1928. It then entered three other collections in Paris: the Musée National d'Art Moderne, in 1977, then The Louvre and finally the Musée d'Orsay. A preparatory drawing is held in a private collection in Saint-Germain-en-Laye.
