= Bouches-du-Rhône's 13th constituency =

Constituency of the National Assembly of France

13th constituency of Bouches-du-Rhône
- inline Constituency of the National Assembly of France

- Constituency in Bouches-du-Rhône Department (white area is the Étang de Berre lagoon)

- Bouches-du-Rhône in France
- Deputy: Emmanuel Fouquart; RN
- Department: Bouches-du-Rhône

The 13th constituency of Bouches-du-Rhône is a French legislative constituency in Bouches-du-Rhône.

== Deputies ==
Election	Member	Party
1988	Paul Lombard	PCF
1993	Olivier Darrason	UDF
1997	Michel Vaxès	PCF
2002	Michel Vaxès	PCF
2007	Michel Vaxès	PCF
2012	Gaby Charroux	PCF
2017	Pierre Dharréville	PCF
2022	Pierre Dharréville	PCF
2024	Emmanuel Fouquart	RN

== Elections ==
=== 2024 ===
Candidate	Party	Alliance	First round			Second round		
Candidate	Party	Alliance	Votes	%	+/–	Votes	%	+/–
Emmanuel Fouquart	RN		27,908	47.53	+16.52	31,084	52.87	+4.88
Pierre Dharréville	PCF	NFP	21,147	36.02	+0.19	27,707	47.13	-4.88
Lila Lokmane	RE	Ensemble	7,239	12.33	-3.09			
Hervé Delespaul	DLF		934	1.59	-0.12			
Olympe Scheredre	REC		876	1.49	-3.38			
Cyril Metral	LO		613	1.04	-0.33			
Votes			58,717	100.00		58,791	100.00	
Valid votes			58,717	96.63	-0.80	58,791	94.90	+2.15
Blank votes			1,332	2.19	+0.41	2,249	3.63	-1.80
Null votes			714	1.18	+0.39	910	1.47	-0.35
Turnout			60,763	64.07	+20.48	61,950	65.33	+21.18
Abstentions			34,075	35.93	-20.48	32,878	34.67	-21.18
Registered voters			94,838			94,828		
Result			RN GAIN FROM PCF					

=== 2022 ===
Legislative Election 2022: Bouches-du-Rhône's 13th constituency
Party	Candidate	Votes	%	±%
PCF (NUPÉS)	Pierre Dharréville	14,361	35.83	+1.94
RN	Emmanuel Fouquart	12,430	31.01	+7.27
MoDem (Ensemble)	Thierry Boissin	6,180	15.42	−8.53
REC	Christiane Villecourt-Gil	1,953	4.87	N/A
LR (UDC)	Isabelle Rouby	1,205	3.01	−5.75
DVE	Joël-Pierre Chevreux	954	2.38	N/A
Others	N/A	3,003		
Turnout		41,144	43.59	−3.00
2nd round result
PCF (NUPÉS)	Pierre Dharréville	20,105	52.01	-10.40
RN	Emmanuel Fouquart	18,548	47.99	N/A
Turnout		38,653	44.15	+2.90
PCF hold				

=== 2017 ===
Candidate	Label	First round		Second round	
Candidate	Label	Votes	%	Votes	%
Pierre Dharréville	PCF	12,435	29.31	21,602	62.41
Magali Sirerols	REM	10,159	23.95	13,013	37.59
Emmanuel Fouquart	FN	10,073	23.74		
Jean-Luc Di Maria	LR	3,718	8.76		
Eveline Lelieur	ECO	1,135	2.68		
Fabienne Bontemps	UDI	1,074	2.53		
Audrey Corral	DLF	942	2.22		
Ariane Roques	ECO	861	2.03		
Lionel Jarema	PS	804	1.90		
Cyril Métral	EXG	564	1.33		
Marie Mainville	DIV	304	0.72		
Denis Faucheur	DIV	237	0.56		
Véronique Iorio	DVD	119	0.28		
Younes Labiad	ECO	1	0.00		
Votes		42,426	100.00	34,615	100.00
Valid votes		42,426	97.07	34,615	89.44
Blank votes		914	2.09	2,734	7.06
Null votes		368	0.84	1,354	3.50
Turnout		43,708	46.59	38,703	41.25
Abstentions		50,109	53.41	55,114	58.75
Registered voters		93,817		93,817	
Source: Ministry of the Interior

=== 2012 ===
Summary of the 10 June and 17 June 2012 French legislative election in Bouches-du-Rhône’s 13th Constituency
Candidate	Party		1st round		2nd round	
Candidate	Party		Votes	%	Votes	%
Gaby Charroux	Left Front	FG	14,617	27.41%	29,919	60.28%
René Raimondi	Socialist Party	PS	13,234	24.82%	WITHDREW	
Béatrix Espallardo	Front National	FN	11,567	21.69%	19,717	39.72%
Michèle Vasserot	Union for a Popular Movement	UMP	7,875	14.77%		
Paul Lombard	Miscellaneous Left	DVG	2,156	4.04%		
Véronique Coulomb	Europe Ecology – The Greens	EELV	1,062	1.99%		
Anne Zakarian	New Centre-Presidential Majority	NCE	1,044	1.96%		
Adil Fajry	Far Left	EXG	680	1.28%		
Dominique Laumonier	Ecologist	ECO	400	0.75%		
Roland Larivier	Far Right	EXD	330	0.62%		
Monique Guyonnaud-Meugnot	Miscellaneous Right	DVD	197	0.37%		
Anne Roche	Far Left	EXG	164	0.31%		
Total			53,326	100%	49,636	100%
Registered voters			90,594		90,571	
Blank/Void ballots			751	1.39%	2,561	4.91%
Turnout			54,077	59.69%	52,197	57.63%
Abstentions			36,517	40.31%	38,374	42.37%
Result					FG GAIN FROM PCF	

=== 2007 ===
Summary of the 10 June and 17 June 2007 French legislative election in Bouches-du-Rhône’s 13th Constituency
Candidate	Party		1st round		2nd round	
Candidate	Party		Votes	%	Votes	%
Michel Vaxès	Communist	PCF	16,075	30.47%	29,260	56.03%
Alain Aragneau	Union for a Popular Movement	UMP	17,270	32.74%	22,962	43.97%
René Raimondi	Socialist Party	PS	7,952	15.07%		
José Rodriguez	Front National	FN	2,941	5.58%		
Jean Fayolle	Democratic Movement	MoDem	2,401	4.55%		
Dominique Laumonier	Ecologist	ECO	1,209	2.29%		
Dany Sans	Independent	DIV	1,176	2.23%		
Géraldine Grimaud	Far Left	EXG	1,015	1.92%		
Salim Djerari	Independent	DIV	532	1.01%		
Marie-Christine Pinard	Hunting, Fishing, Nature, Traditions	CPNT	517	0.98%		
Claude Donjerkovic	Movement for France	MPF	405	0.77%		
Hervé Guerrera	Regionalist	REG	394	0.75%		
Roland Lariviere	Far Right	EXD	342	0.65%		
Anne Roche	Far Left	EXG	311	0.59%		
Michel Gayvallet	Independent	DIV	211	0.40%		
Christophe Vivaldi	Miscellaneous Right	DVD	0	0.00%		
Total			52,751	100%	52,222	100%
Registered voters			89,518		89,515	
Blank/Void ballots			1,014	1.89%	1,689	3.13%
Turnout			53,765	60.06%	53,911	60.23%
Abstentions			35,753	39.94%	35,604	39.77%
Result					PCF HOLD	

=== 2002 ===
Legislative Election 2002: Bouches-du-Rhône's 13th constituency
Party	Candidate	Votes	%	±%
PCF	Michel Vaxès	19,309	37.22	
UMP	Arlette Fructus	10,401	20.05	
FN	Jose Rodriduez	9,799	18.89	
UDF	Jean-Pierre Luciani	2,749	5.30	
LV	Christian Caroz	2,084	4.02	
Others	N/A	7,536		
Turnout		53,225	63.81	
2nd round result
PCF	Michel Vaxès	26,204	56.59	
UMP	Arlette Fructus	20,099	43.41	
Turnout		48,873	58.59	
PCF hold				

=== 1997 ===
Legislative Election 1997: Bouches-du-Rhône's 13th constituency
Party	Candidate	Votes	%	±%
PCF	Michel Vaxès	14,991	27.86	
UDF	Olivier Darrason	13,036	24.22	
PS	Jacques Siffre	10,349	19.23	
FN	Alain Cardamone	9,390	17.45	
MEI	Guylaine Cozza	1,622	3.01	
LO	Olivier Josue	1,296	2.41	
Others	N/A	3,131		
Turnout		55,701	72.45	
2nd round result
PCF	Michel Vaxès	30,493	57.06	
UDF	Olivier Darrason	22,947	42.94	
Turnout		57,188	74.39	
PCF gain from UDF				
