= Égratz Viaduct =

Égratz Viaduct Viaduc des Égratz
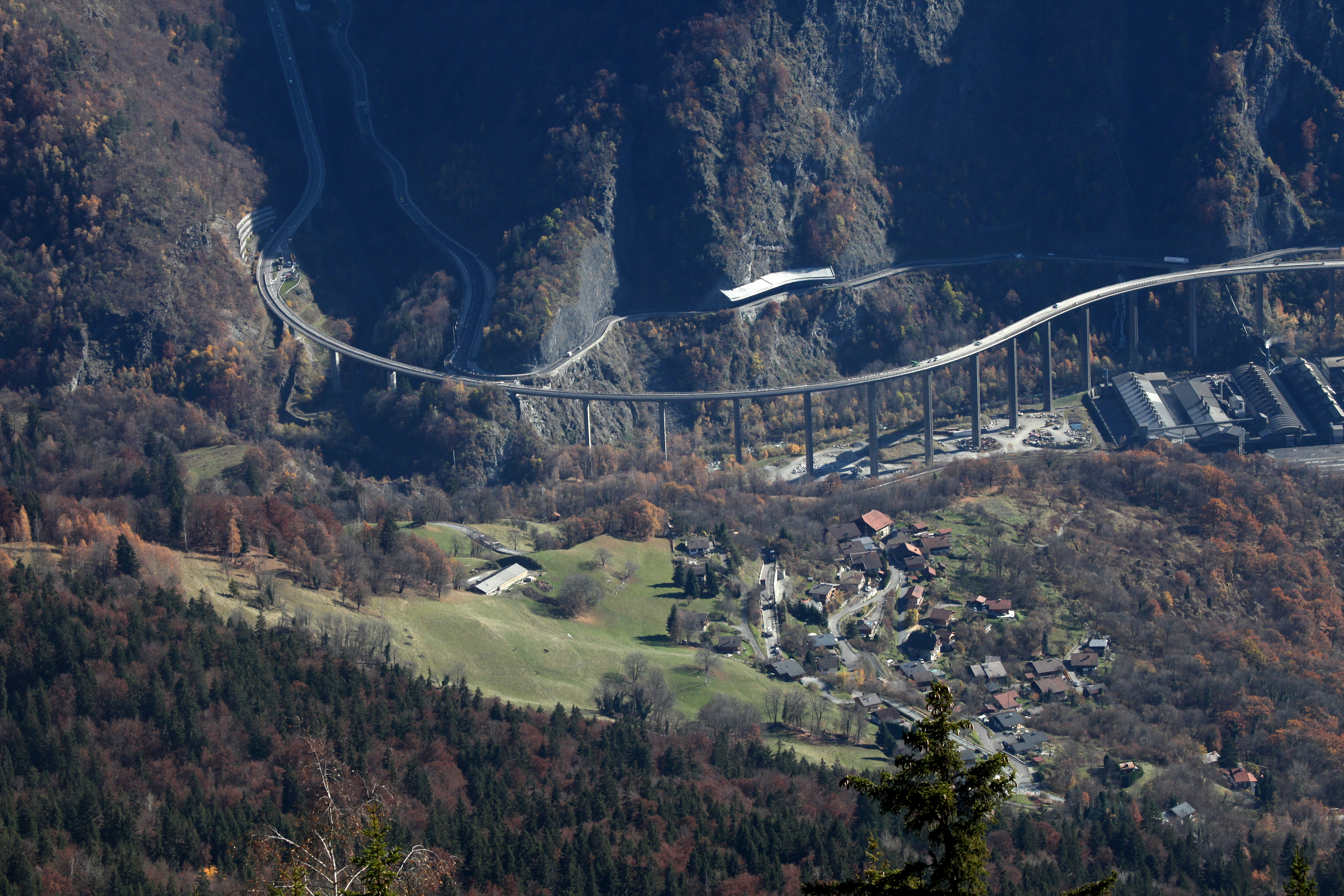
- View in November 2015
- Coordinates: 45.928°N 6.734°E
- Carries: Vehicles on the Route nationale N205
- Crosses: Plateau d'Assy and River Arve
- Locale: Auvergne-Rhône-Alpes, south-east France

Characteristics
- Design: Box girder bridge
- Material: Reinforced concrete
- Total length: 1,469 m (4,820 ft)
- Width: 11.2 m (37 ft)
- Height: 68 m (223 ft)
- Longest span: 49 m (161 ft)

History
- Constructed by: Société des Grands Travaux de Marseille
- Construction start: 1977
- Opened: 1981
- Inaugurated: 22 December 1981

Location
- Interactive map of Égratz Viaduct

The Égratz Viaduct is a curved concrete box girder bridge in south-east France, in the French Alps, near Switzerland and Italy. The bridge is almost one mile long.

== History ==
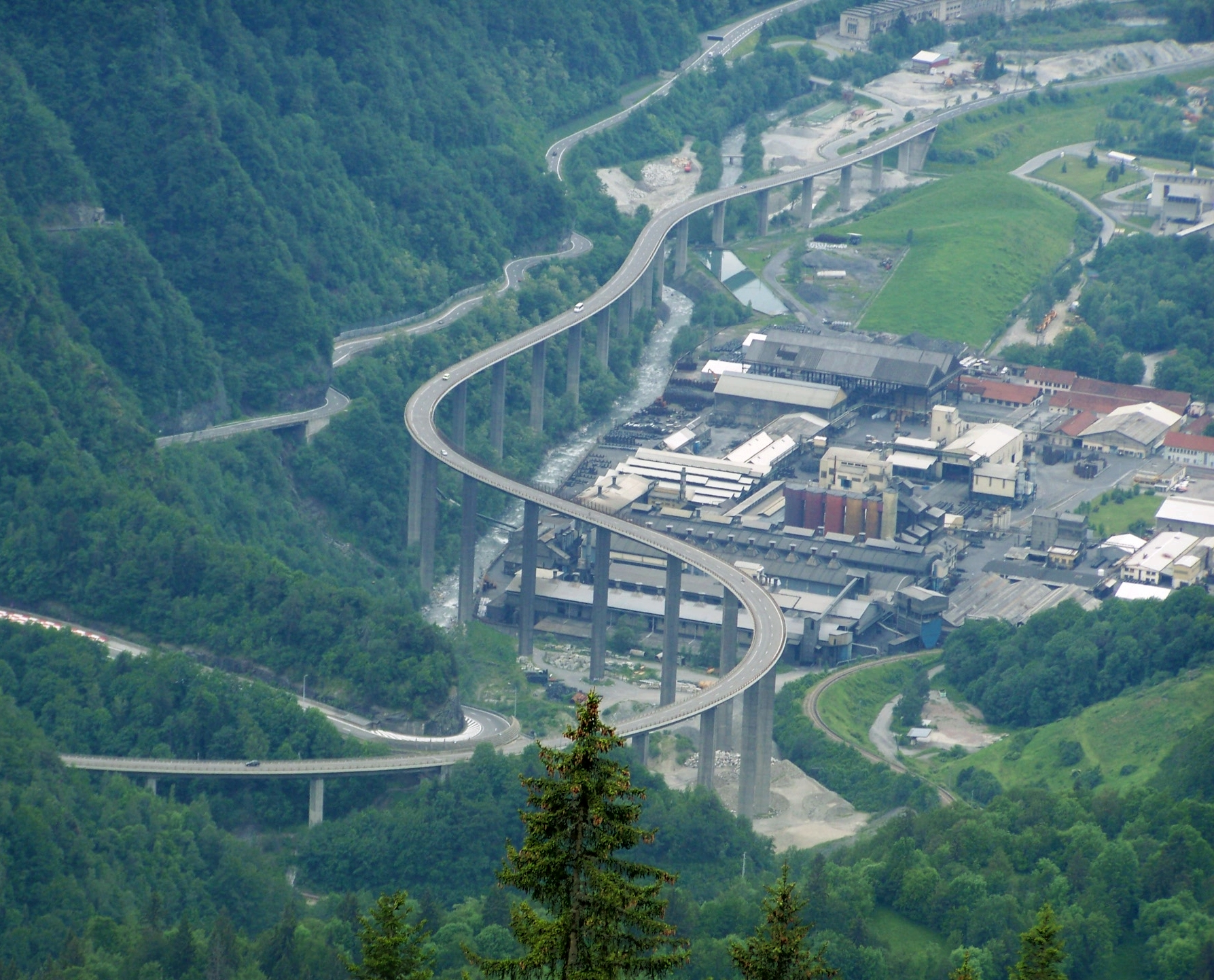
View in June 2010

=== Design ===
It is a curved box girder bridge.

=== Construction ===
It opened on 22 December 1981, and was renovated in 2015.

== Structure ==
It is in the Haute-Savoie department. It carries road traffic on the N205, the eastern continuation of the A40 autoroute, known locally as La Route Blanche.

The viaduct featured in aerial photography in the 2016 film Our Kind of Traitor.
