= Maison du chemin de Paradis =

Manor house in Martigues, France

- Maison du chemin de Paradis
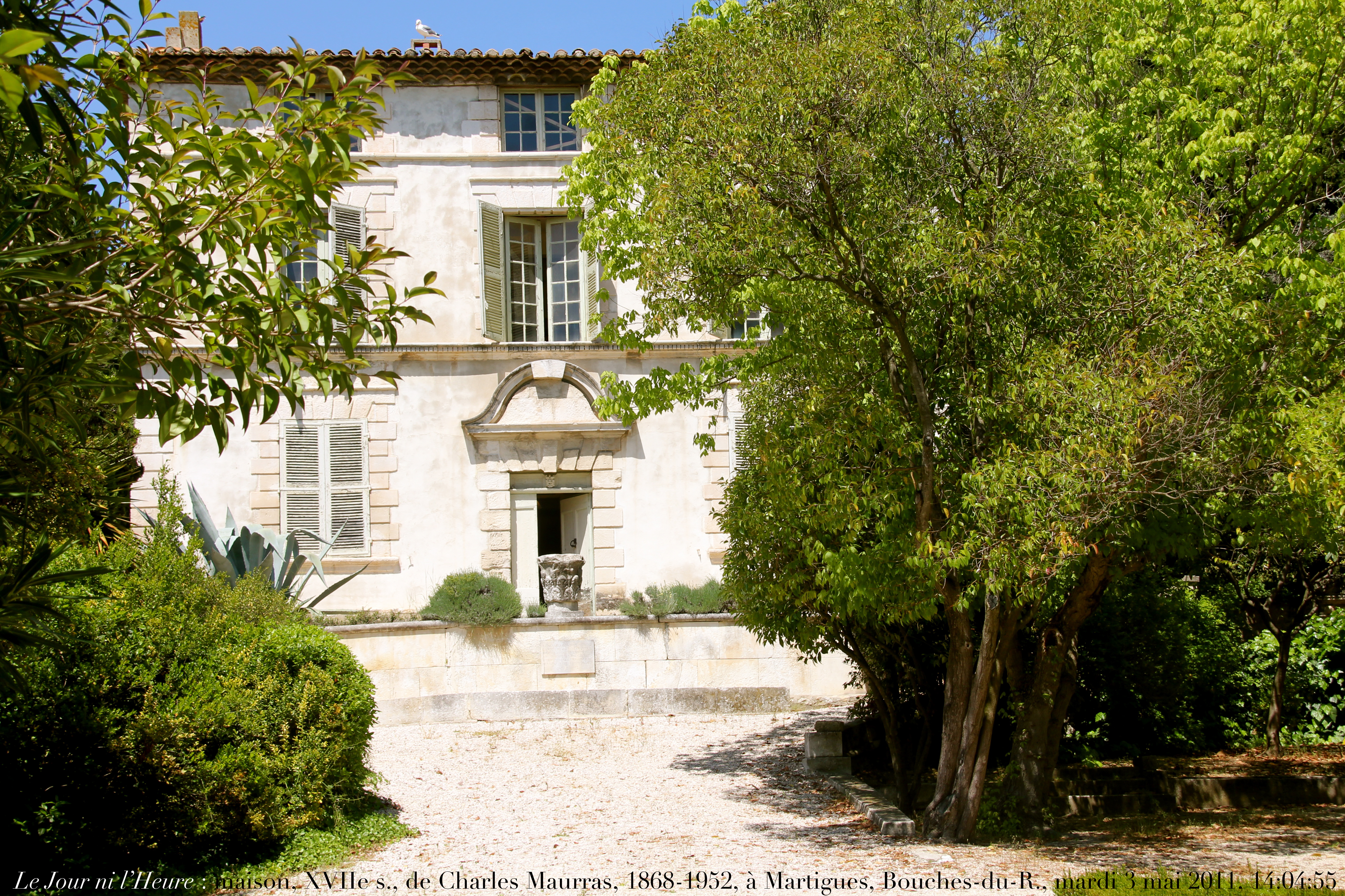
- Interactive map of Maison du chemin de Paradis
- Location: Martigues, France
- Coordinates: 43°24′29″N 5°02′53″E
- Type: Bastide

The Maison du chemin de Paradis (French pronunciation: [mɛzɔ̃ dy ʃəmɛ̃ də paʁadi]) or Bastide du chemin de Paradis ([bastid-]) is a bastide located on Chemin de Paradis, in Martigues, France. It is the residence of Charles Maurras.

The facades and roofs have been listed as historic monuments since September 2, 1975.

== Historical ==
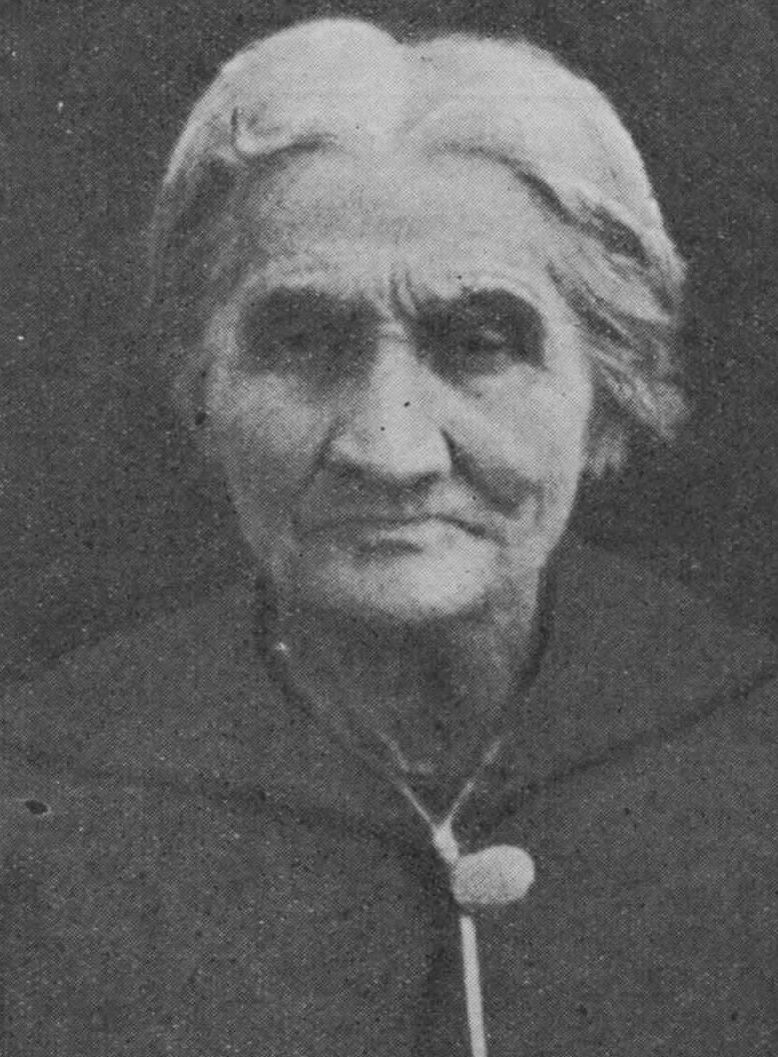
Marie-Pélagie Maurras, born Garnier, mother of Charles Maurras.

The bastide was built in the 16th century and inherited from Marie-Pélagie Garnier, mother of Charles Maurras, in 1881. The building would be constructed from the stones of the former Church of the Island. The Maurras family home is designed on three levels consisting of three to four rooms. It is framed by cypresses and dominated a few hundred meters higher by an old mill. During his adult life, Charles Maurras seeks to return there as often as possible in summer but also during the course of the year.

== Library ==
Maurras has the library repatriated from his Paris apartment so as to establish his Provençal home as "the heart of a great writer's house". Maurras planned to move into his home "a center for free literary and historical studies (a bit of a museum, a bit and above all of a library) for gifted young people who would have a disposition for personal work". A committee was to be appointed for the administration of his personal archives, correspondence, books, deluxe edition manuscripts, family pictures, portraits and memories of friends, furniture, academic insignia, civic crown, volumes of political propaganda. In addition, its library of twelve thousand books was to be transformed into a "people's library". This library is an important fund because it includes many books dedicated by André Gide, Malraux, Anatole France, Paul Valéry or Joseph Kessel.

== Garden ==
The garden of the property is a gift to Martigues because "it forms a true summary of its history and its memory: Greek amphorae and inscriptions, Provençal and French epigraphs, statues of the Garden of Fasti, fragrant trees". Maurras landscaped his garden by having "planted species representative of the Mediterranean garden in general, with particular reference to Greece". It is a symbolic garden whose plans Maurras designed according to an execution estimate dated 1943 and his text entitled Le pain et le vin published in 1944. The sociologist Jean-Louis Fabiani sees in it a creative intention rather than a conservative approach in the arrangement of the garden through its composition and its furniture.

He had a monument built in honor of Gérard Tenque, founder of the Order of the Templars and a native of Martigues.

== Mur des Fastes ==
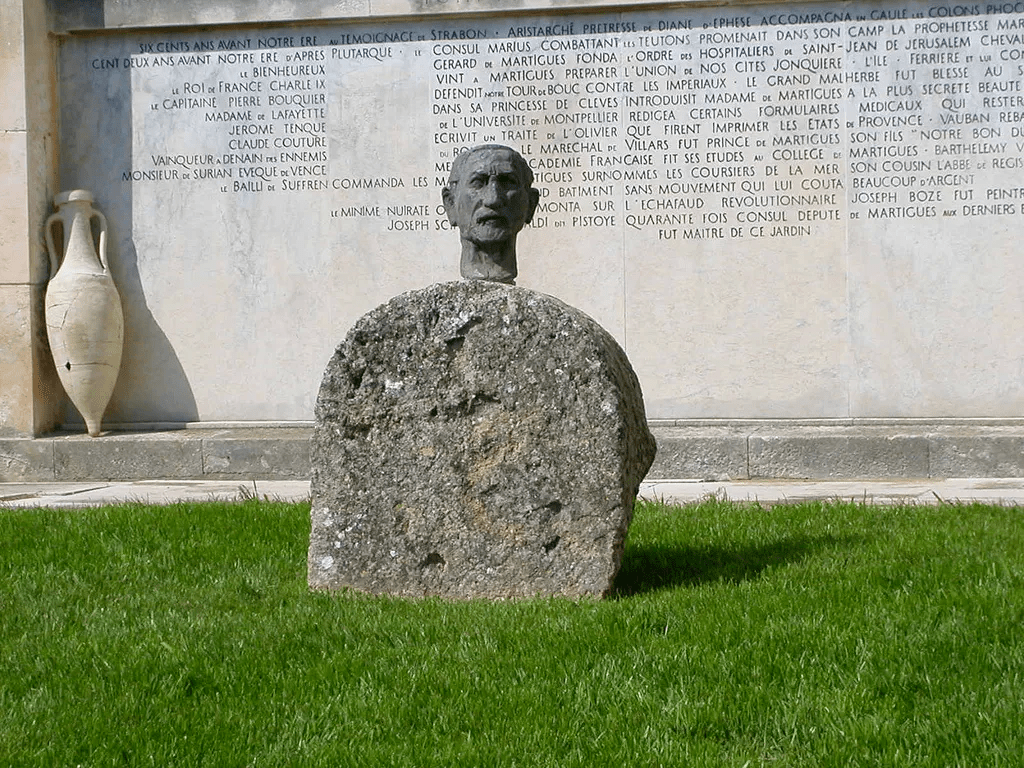
In the foreground, a bust of Charles Maurras made by the architect and sculptor Henry Bernard, Grand Prix de Rome. In the background, the "Mur des fastes" recounts the glories of Martigues over the centuries.

The "mur des Fastes" (wall of splendors) was built in 1944 on the instructions of Maurras although he never saw the finished work due to his incarceration at the end of the Second World War. Inscriptions in capital letters on the wall summarize the history of Martigues:

Six hundred years before our era, according to the testimony of Strabo, Aristarchè, priestess of Diana of Ephesus, accompanied the Phocaean colonists to Gaul: her monument was found in Martigues cent two years before our era, according to Plutarch, the consul Marius fighting the Teutons took the prophetess Martha to his camp. Syrian, she gave her name to this country, Marticum. Blessed Gérard de Martigues founded the order of the Hospitaliers de Saint Jean of Jerusalem, Knights of Rhodes and Malta. The King of France Charles IX came to Martigues to prepare the union of our cities, Jonquières, the Island, Ferrières, and entrusted him with the tricolor Captain Pierre Bouquier defended our tower of goat against the imperials. The great Malherbe was wounded in the siege he had laid before Martigues. Madame de Lafayette in her Princess of Cleves introduced Madame de Martigues to the most secret beauty of the French court. Jérôme Tenque of the University of Montpellier wrote certain medical forms which remained famous for a long time. Claude Couture wrote a treatise on the olive tree which the states of Provence had printed. Vauban is rebuilding our goat tower. Winner at Denain of the enemies of the kingdom, the maréchal de Villars was prince of Martigues. His son, "our good Duke", was the idol of the country. Monsieur de Surian, bishop of Vence, member of the French Academy, studied at the college of Martigues. Barthélémy Vidal was from the Academy of Sciences. The bailiff of Suffren commanded the sailors of Martigues nicknamed the couriers of the sea. His cousin the abbot of Régis dedicated to him a ship cut in the rock, a large building without movement which cost him a lot of money. The tiny Nuirate sacred orator ascended the revolutionary scaffold. Joseph Boze was painter to King Louis XVI. Joseph-Scipion Sinisbaldi, known as Pistoye, forty times consul, deputy of Martigues in the last states of Provence was master of this garden.

— Charles Maurras,

A bust of Charles Maurras made by the architect and sculptor Henry Bernard, Grand prix de Rome, is installed in front of "mur des Fastes". It rests on a merlon from the Greek wall or a fountain mascaron from the archaeological site of Saint-Blaise.

== Carditaphe ==
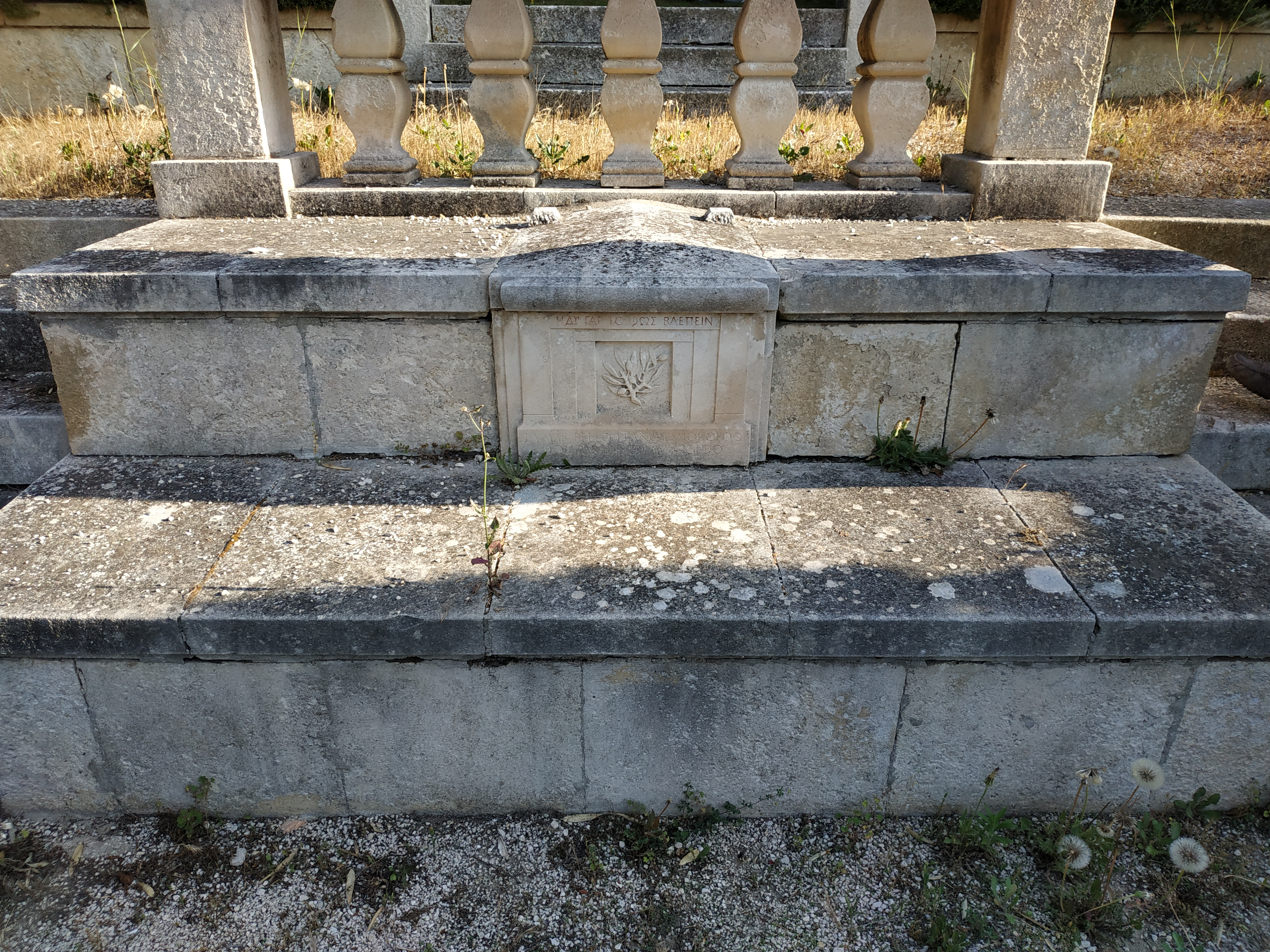
The carditaphe of Charles Maurras in the center. Two verses of Frédéric Mistral from Mirèio (1859) are written in Provençal : « The sea, beautiful turbulent plain, - Of paradise is the avenue ».

In accordance with Maurras' last wishes, his heart is separated from his body and buried in the garden of Martigues while his remains join his grave in Roquevaire. The heart is placed in a carditaphe arranged below the "mur des Fastes", on the left in the garden of Martigues. During the final ceremony in the garden, the priest of Ferrières blesses the heart deposited, then Victor Rolland pays homage to the Martégal on behalf of the guild of fishermen of Martigues.

== Donation ==
Shortly before his death, Maurras had suggested setting up a management committee for the bastide, without success. This committee was to be composed of the mayor as honorary president, the first deputy, three municipal councilors representing three political colors (PCF, SFIO, RPF), a representative of the museum, and three close friends (Victor Rolland, Maurel, Berlot).

When Maurras died in November 1952, the building and the garden were bequeathed to the town hall out of "municipal patriotism", although the elected communists on the municipal council initially refused it on the pretext that the bequest was "devoid of validity". Indeed, the communist newspaper La Marseillaise maintains that "the validity of the will is questionable, it being specified that it emanates from a person sentenced to life imprisonment who could not, at that time, freely dispose of his property". Despite the "consensual mechanism that Maurras had cleverly imagined", it was difficult to imagine for "a public community, whatever its political color", to accept this type of donation at the end of the Second World War.

Despite the refusal of the town hall, the heirs of Maurras and the Society of Friends of Charles Maurras ensure visits for four decades.

It was finally on September 27, 1997, that the communist mayor Paul Lombard accepts the bequest from the hands of Jacques Maurras, nephew of the former owner. Michel Déon, former secretary of Maurras and representative of the French Academy, is also present at the ceremony of handing over the keys. The town hall is required to "perpetuate the property complex, garden and building, and maintain the library" and to preserve its concept of "writer's house".

== Rehabilitation ==
In 2012, the town hall invested more than 200,000 euros in the restoration of the site.

Since 2018, the town hall has decided that the library fund and the house will be part of a resource and research center for 20th century policies open to researchers. Florian Salazar-Martin, elected to Culture and Cultural Rights, wanted "to offer researchers the tools to combat the thought of Maurras, also that of the 1930s". In 2018, journalist Franz-Olivier Giesbert produced a report on the closure of the site. 850,000 euros have been released to redo the bastide on Chemin de Paradis but the work has still not been undertaken.

The house is closed to the public for "security reasons" pending this work.

== Around the bastide ==
Charles Maurras wrote a storybook called Le Chemin de Paradis in 1895.

In the book De la rue de Rome au Chemin de Paradis by Joseph Kessel published in 1927, the author recounts a visit to the residence of Maurras.

== See also ==
- Liste des monuments historiques des Bouches-du-Rhône

== Bibliography ==
- Giocanti, Stéphane (2006). Charles Maurras : le chaos et l'ordre (in French). Flammarion. ISBN 978-2-7574-2123-9.
- Fabiani, Jean-Louis (2001). "Comment rendre Charles Maurras provençalement correct?". In Alban Bansa; Daniel Fabre (eds.). Une histoire à soi: Figurations du passé et localités. Paris: Éditions de la Maison des sciences de l’homme.
- Brassié, Anne (January–March 2003). "J'ai emprunté le chemin de Paradis". Bulletin Charles Maurras (17). Niherne.
- Roger Joseph, Martigues et le Chemin de Paradis, Les Amis du Chemin de Paradis, 1957.
