= Emmanuel Fouquart =

French politician (born 1966)

Member of the National Assembly for Bouches-du-Rhône's 13th constituency
- Incumbent
- Assumed office 18 July 2024
- Preceded by: Pierre Dharréville

Personal details
- Born: 30 July 1966 (age 58); Maubeuge, France
- Political party: National Rally
- Profession: Police officer

Emmanuel Fouquart (born July 30, 1966, in Maubeuge) is a French politician of the National Rally who has represented Bouches-du-Rhône's 13th constituency in the French National Assembly since 2024.

== Biography ==
Fouquart was in July 1966 in Maubeuge. He joined the French Navy at the age of 16 before becoming an officer in the National Gendarmerie in 1990. He moved to Martigues in 2011.

Fouquart has said he became politically active after being disappointed by the victory of François Hollande in the 2012 French presidential election and joined the National Front a year later. He was elected as a councilor for the National Front in Martigues in 2014 and that same year took over as chairman of the National Front's branch in Martigues. During the 2024 French legislative election he contested Bouches-du-Rhône's 13th constituency and defeated outgoing French Communist Party deputy Pierre Dharréville in the second round.
