= Pierre Dharréville =

French politician (born 1975)

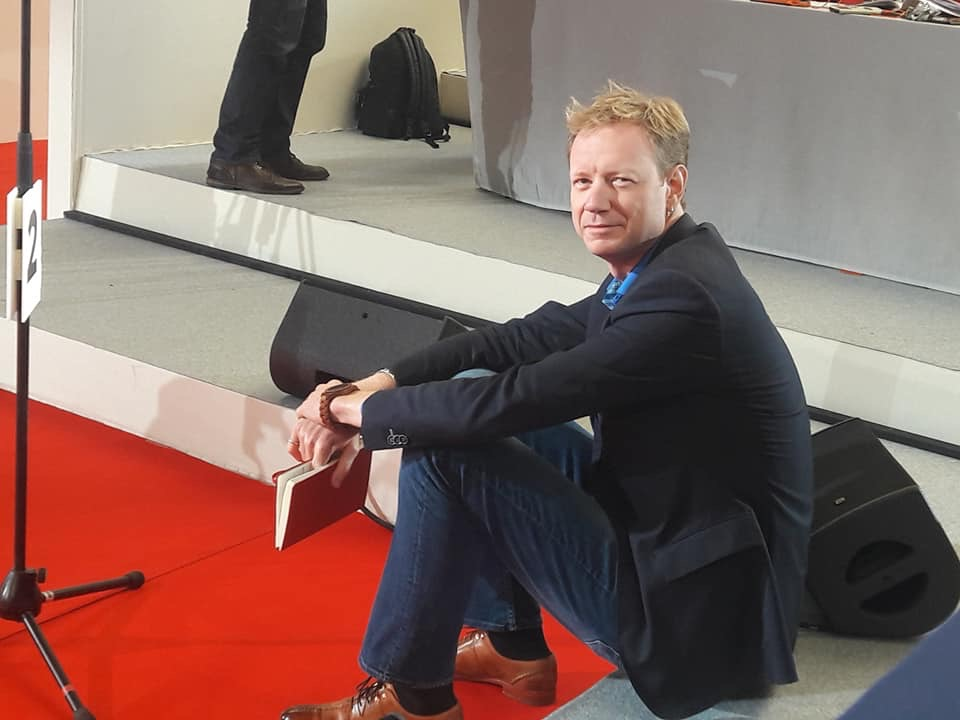
- Pierre Dharréville in 2019

Member of the National Assembly for Bouches-du-Rhône's 13th constituency
- In office 21 June 2017 – 9 June 2024
- Preceded by: Gaby Charroux
- Succeeded by: Emmanuel Fouquart

Personal details
- Born: 15 June 1975 (age 51) Nanterre, France
- Party: French Communist Party
- Education: University of Montpellier

Pierre Dharréville (born 15 June 1975) is a French politician. From 2017 to 2024, he served as the member of the National Assembly for the 13th district of the Bouches-du-Rhône, which includes Martigues.

== Biography ==
Married with three children, Pierre Camille Bernard Dharréville was born to a father from Haute-Marne who worked for social security and a mother from Gard who was a schoolteacher. His two grandfathers were a miner and a sawmill worker, respectively, while one of his grandmothers was an Italian immigrant who worked as a domestic servant. He is the eldest of three children in a Catholic family. He spent his entire childhood and youth in Nîmes, in the Gard department. In 1984, he met Christian Vaquette, his future partner in the band Les Bons Bardes. He obtained his Bac C in 1993 at the Lycée Daudet, then in 1996, a bachelor's degree in history at the University of Paul-Valéry-Montpellier-III.
