= Église Notre-Dame de Toute Grâce du Plateau d'Assy =

Church in Passy, France

Notre-Dame de Toute Grâce du Plateau d'Assy
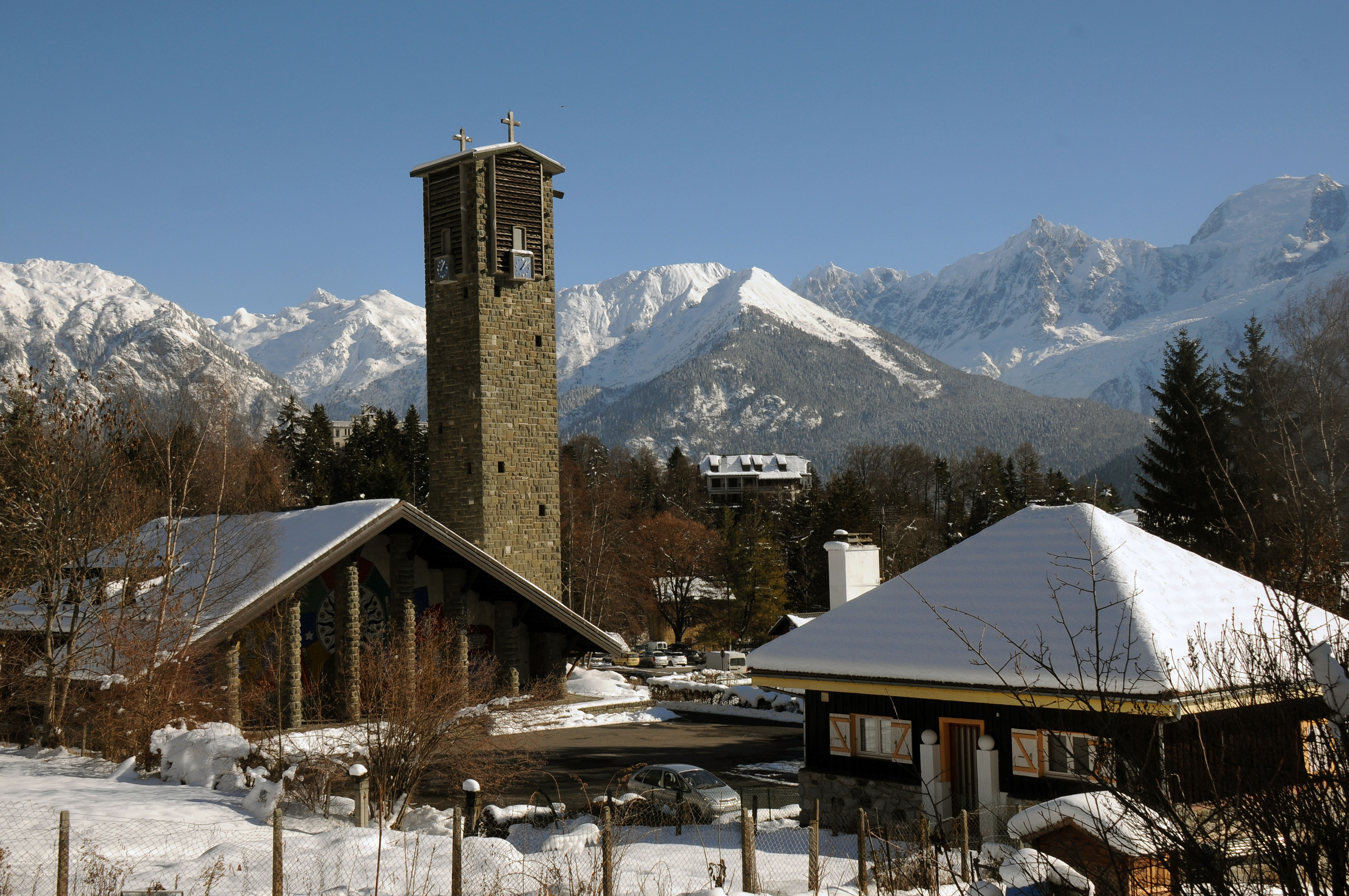
- The church in the winter of 2016

Religion
- Affiliation: Roman Catholic

Location
- Location: Passy, Haute-Savoie
- Interactive map of Notre-Dame de Toute Grâce du Plateau d'Assy
- Coordinates: 45°56′22″N 6°42′38″E

Architecture
- Architect: Maurice Novarina
- Type: church
- Style: modern
- Groundbreaking: 1937
- Completed: 1946

The church of Notre-Dame de Toute Grâce du Plateau d'Assy (Our Lady Full of Grace of the Plateau d'Assy) is a Roman Catholic church in France, constructed on the plateau d'Assy between 1937 and 1946. It faces Mont Blanc, and is within the territory of the commune of Passy, in the Haute-Savoie department. Constructed at the urging of canon Jean Devémy and designed by the Savoyard architect Maurice Novarina, the church is celebrated for its decoration, contributed by some of the best-known artists of the twentieth century. It is also viewed as an important landmark in the development of modern sacred art; its consecration in 1950 caused much consternation within the ranks of the clergy of France, who had hitherto been accustomed to more traditionally classical structures.

On June 11, 2004, Notre-Dame de Toute Grâce du Plateau d'Assy was classed as a monument historique de France.

== History ==
Before World War II, the plateau d'Assy was known as a spa area, and was especially popular with people with tuberculosis. At one point, close to twenty sanatoriums could be found in the area. Some of these were equipped with small chapels, while others were visited by chaplains who catered to the sick. There was, however, no church in the area.

In 1935, Jean Devémy (1896–1981), then serving as chaplain to the sanatorium of Sancellemoz, hit upon the idea of building a church dedicated to serving not only the sick of the spas but also the personnel who worked at them. With the blessing of the bishop of Annecy, Florent du Bois de la Villerabel, he decided to hold an architectural contest to design the new structure. The contest took place in 1937 and was won by the young architect Maurice Novarina. Novarina's plan was to use materials native to the region in the construction of the church; this would include various types of stone – including slate - and wood. The work would be given to local concerns. Construction began in 1938 and was, for the most part, concluded by the start of World War II.

Even as the church was being erected, Devémy was considering ways of decorating the new building. While he was considering his options, his friend, the artist and Dominican Marie-Alain Couturier, invited him to Paris to visit an art exhibition. Devémy was greatly taken with a stained glass window of Georges Rouault, which depicted the Passion of Christ. Supposedly, when he measured the windows of the church upon his return, the Rouault window was found to be an exact fit for the structure. Devémy referred to this incident as the "miracle of Assy".

Notre-Dame de Toute Grâce du Plateau d'Assy was formally blessed in 1941; in that same year, the crypt was opened for services.

== Design ==
=== Architecture ===
In collaboration with Édouard Malot, Novarina designed a church to be built out of local stone, called Taveyannaz sandstone; it is the same type of stone frequently used to build chalets in the Savoie. The roof is pointed and is meant to sustain large amounts of snow; the foundation of the structure is solidly anchored in the soil. The church is topped by a massive twenty-eight-metre bell tower, carefully designed to withstand local tectonic movements. Eight massive pillars support a hood to a depth of five metres. The interior of the building is meant to resemble a Roman chapel, with a rectangular nave flanked by two aisles. The choir is semicircular, surrounded by an ambulatory and sitting above the crypt. Arcades mounted on monolithic pillars separate different portions of the structure.

=== Decorative scheme ===
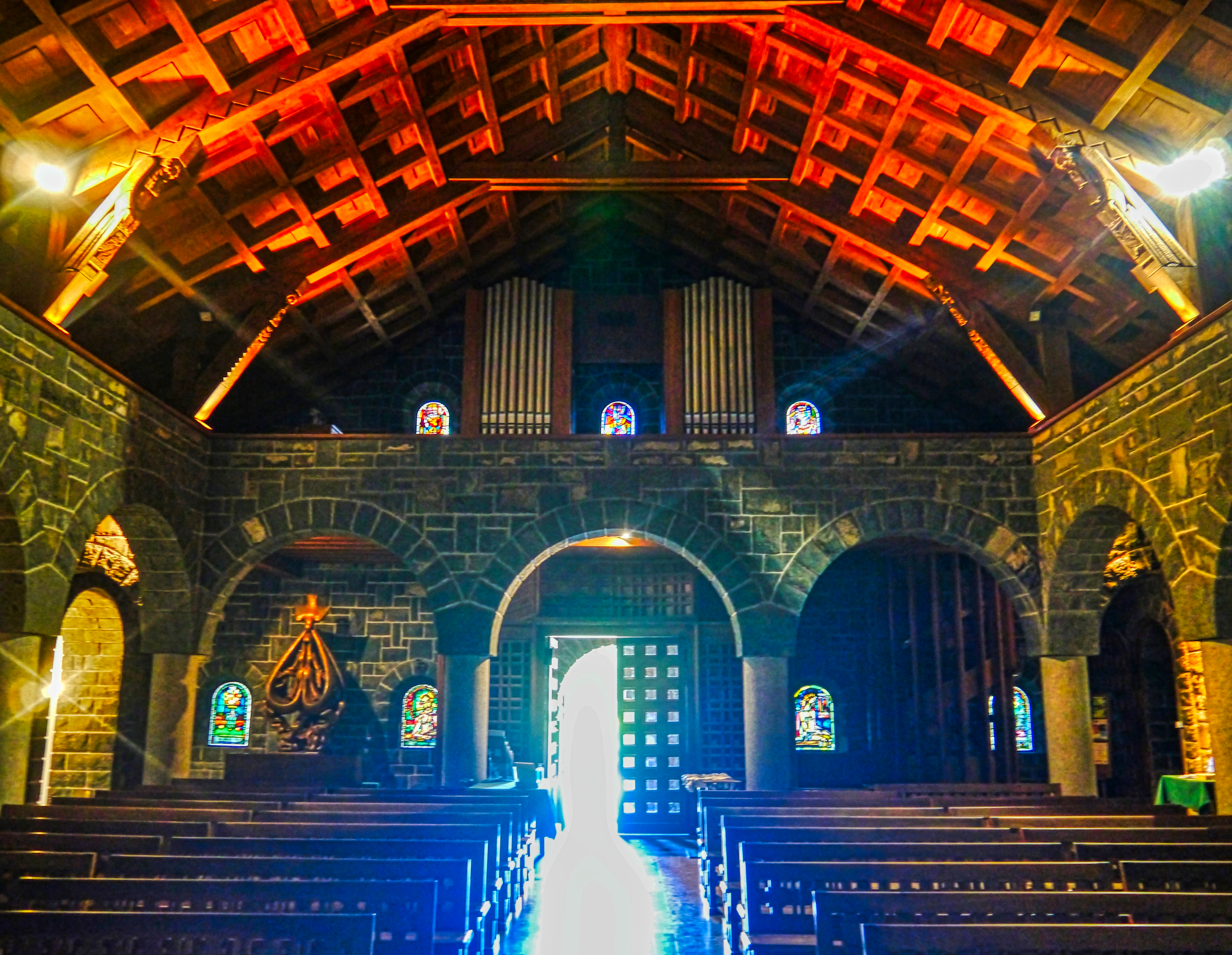
The interior of the church, looking back at the entrance

The church is best known for its rich interior decoration, which Devémy commissioned from some of the most famous artists of the first half of the twentieth century; consequently, its interior scheme has been said to serve as a microcosm of early modernism and of the era's changing conception of sacred art. Devémy was able to contact many of the artists through Father Couturier, and most who were asked accepted with enthusiasm. Among those who contributed paintings, sculptures, tapestries, stained glass, ceramics, and mosaics to the church were Pierre Bonnard, Fernand Léger, Jean Lurçat, his student Paul Cosandier, Germaine Richier, Georges Rouault, Jean Bazaine, Henri Matisse, Georges Braque, Jacques Lipchitz, Marc Chagall, Constant Demaison, Ladislas Kijno, Claude Mary, Carlo Sergio Signori, and Théodore Strawinsky. The artists were chosen for their skill and not for their religious bent; this was a hallmark of Couturier's manner of thinking about religious art.
