= Hôtel de Ville, Martigues =

Town hall in Martigues, France

Hôtel de Ville
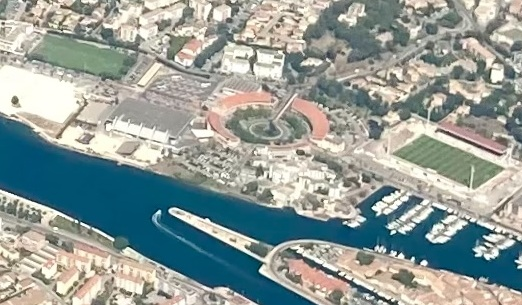
- Aerial view of the Hôtel de Ville in July 2024 (the Rond-Point is in the centre of the picture, with Delaugerre's original modular structures just below and to the right of the Rond-Point)
- Interactive map of the Hôtel de Ville area

General information
- Type: City hall
- Architectural style: Modern style
- Location: Martigues, France
- Coordinates: 43.4055°N 5.0488°E
- Completed: 1983

Design and construction
- Architect: Claude Delaugerre

The Hôtel de Ville (French pronunciation: [otɛl də vil], City Hall) is a municipal building in Martigues, Bouches-du-Rhône, in southern France, standing on Avenue Louis Sammut.

== History ==
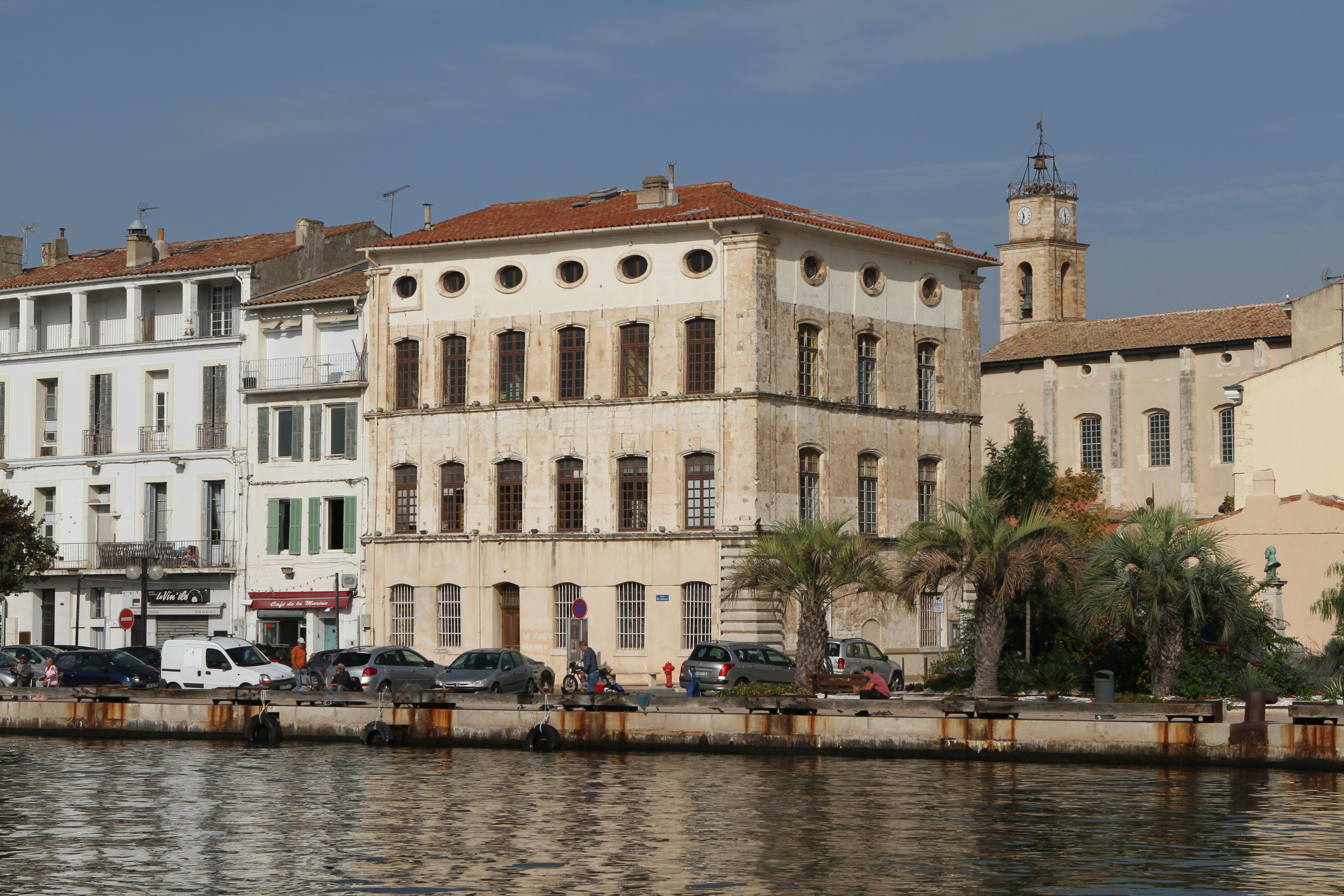
The Hôtel Colla de Pradine

After the French Revolution, the newly elected town council initially held their meetings in the home of the mayor at the time. However, in the early 19th century, they decided to acquire a dedicated municipal building. The structure they selected was the Hôtel Colla de Pradine on what is now Place de la Libération on an island in the centre of the Canal of Caronte. It was designed in the Baroque style, built in stone with a stucco finish and was completed in 1678. The design involved a symmetrical main frontage of six bays facing onto Place de la Libération. The doorway was in the third bay on the left. It was fenestrated by segmental headed windows on three floors, with a series of oculi at attic level. The building served as the home of the prominent Colla de Pradine family. Barthélémy de Colla de Pradines (1724–1796) and his son, Xavier de Colla de Pradines, (1761–1791) both served as advisors to the Parlement of Aix-en-Provence. The council completed the purchase of the building in 1808.

Following significant population growth in the 1960s, the council decided to commission a modern town hall. The site they selected, on the north side of the canal, was inundated by salt marshes. Constructure of the new building started in 1981. It was designed by Claude Delaugerre in the modern style, built in concrete and glass and was officially opened by the mayor, Paul Lombard, on 26 November 1983.

The design involved a series of modular structures of varying height arranged around a series of patios. The entrance hall contained eight fine mosaic panels designed by Jean René Bazaine and assembled under the direction of Gino Silvestri da Bellun.

In the early 21st century, the complex was extended with the completion of the Rond-Point (roundabout) to the northwest of the original buildings. The design of this circular extension included a small garden in the centre, a circular access road, a ring of trees and bushes, and a circular building on the outside. The circular building incorporated new access to the town hall in the southeast quadrant, a new tourist office in the southwest quadrant, a police station in the northwest quadrant, and a hotel in the northeast quadrant. The entrance to the southeast quadrant also accommodated a small museum, the Galerie de l'histoire de Martigues, which was officially opened in 2007.
