= Paul Lombard =

French politician (1927–2020)

Mayor of Martigues
- In office 1968–2009
- Preceded by: Francis Turcan
- Succeeded by: Gaby Charroux

General Councillor for the Canton of Martigues
- In office 1970–1988
- Preceded by: Armand Audibert
- Succeeded by: Michel Vaxès

Member of the French National Assembly for Bouches-du-Rhône
- In office 13 June 1988 – 1 April 1993

Personal details
- Born: 15 December 1927 La Ciotat, France
- Died: 7 June 2020 (aged 92) Martigues, France
- Party: PCF

Paul Henri Marius Lombard (15 December 1927 – 7 June 2020) was a French politician.

== Biography ==
Lombard was born in La Ciotat, but his family moved to Martigues when he was a few years old. His father, Paul-Baptistin Lombard, who took part in the French Resistance, was shot and killed by the Germans on 13 June 1944.

Lombard entered the municipal council of Martigues in 1953 following the resignation of his mother. That year, he led the French Communist Party's (PCF) ticket against incumbent Mayor Paul Pascal of the French Section of the Workers' International. In 1959, Francis Turcan was elected mayor, and Lombard became his financial assistant. Then during the Turcan administration, Martigues began its modernization, moving on from its industrial past.

After Turcan died in 1968, Lombard became Mayor of Martigues. He would be re-elected in 1971, 1977, 1983, 1989, 1989, 1995, 2001, and 2008, winning a majority in the first round every time. The city was heavily modernized, as it did not have a sewage system in 1959. The construction of the Martigues canal and the central water treatment plant were significant steps taken during the Lombard administration. Additionally, the construction of the Hôpital Rayettes, the Lycée Jean Lurçat, and the highway to Fos-sur-Mer and Arles were completed in 1974. A new library was built in 1981 and a new town hall was constructed in 1983. In 1993, the Halle de Martigues was built, and, in 1995, the Théâtre des Salins.

Lombard was re-elected for the 7th time in 2008, but announced his departure in 2009, giving the reins to Gaby Charroux. The transition of power took place on 29 May 2009 in front of 3000 people. However, Lombard would remain a municipal councillor. In 2011, he was made an Officer of the Legion of Honour.

Paul Lombard died on 7 June 2020 at the age of 92.
