= Plateau d'Assy =

Coordinates: 45°56′15″N 6°42′20″E

Plateau d'Assy (French pronunciation: [plato dasi]) is a region in the French Alps, in Haute-Savoie department, France, near the border of Italy. The plateau is at an altitude of 3,450 feet (1,050 metres) in the foothills of Mont Blanc. Primarily an agricultural district, the plateau is also a winter sports area. The village of Passy is located here.

The plateau, situated below the Fiz mountain range, is popular with paragliders and hang-gliders, and hosts the largest paragliding school in France. In the 1950s the plateau was serviced by a cable car from Chedde, but this no longer exists.

A notable feature of the area is the modern church of Notre Dame de Toute Grace, begun in 1937 and consecrated in 1950. It was designed by the architect Maurice Novarina, and the artists who contributed to its decoration, include Fernand Léger, Jean Lurçat, Germaine Richier, Marc Chagall, Jacques Lipchitz, and Georges Rouault. The church was built through the efforts of Father Marie-Alain Couturier, a Dominican priest, who sought to revitalize church architecture through the contributions of the best contemporary artists regardless of their faith.

Plateau d'Assy was host to a sanatorium for tuberculosis patients. In 1970, 74 people died including 56 children when the sanatorium was hit by a landslide.
