= Jean René Bazaine =

French artist

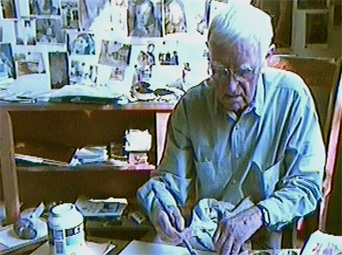
Bazaine in 1995

Jean René Bazaine (French pronunciation: [ʒɑ̃ ʁəne bazɛn]; 21 December 1904 – 4 March 2001) was a French painter, designer of stained glass windows and writer. He was the great great grandson of the English Court portraitist Sir George Hayter.

== Studies ==
Bazaine was born in Paris. He studied sculpture at the Académie Julian and with Paul Landowski after a brief passage at the École des Beaux-Arts. At the same time, he continued his study of philosophy and literature at the Sorbonne in Paris attaining certificats in art history and philosophy (1921–1925). Bergson's L'évolution créatrice was his main inspiration at the time. With Baltrušaitis, he participated at the first "Groupe d'Histoire de l'art" led by Emile Mâle and Henri Focillon.

These studies would culminate in an influential text Notes sur la peinture d'aujourd'hui (1948), aimed at going beyond the boundaries—quite dogmatic at the time—of abstract and figurative. It supplied the theoretical base for Bazaine's creative criticism that found its practical use when he was invited, in 1952, by the Carnegie Foundation to sit as the European member of the jury for the Pittsburgh International Exhibition of Contemporary Painting in company with the American painter William Baziotes.

Bazaine did not pursue his initiation into sculpture, though he became one of the great friends of Alexander Calder, Henri Laurens and of Giacometti, his neighbour at his atelier in the Paris Zone -Porte de Vanves.

== Painting ==
Bazaine was to develop into a significant Modern School of Paris painter. A fire in his workshop in 1945 destroyed almost his entire production, leaving only scant reference to his important series of watercolors of the 1930s that prefigured the experimental feel of his mature work.

Bazaine's work was first shown in company with Jean Fautrier, Édouard Goerg and Marcel Gromaire (Galerie Jeanne Castel, Paris 1930). At his first individual show (Galerie Van Leer, Paris 1932), Bazaine was favourably received by Pierre Bonnard who seemed to recognize a progressive tendency rooted in his own sense of colour (Post-Impressionism developing into Abstract Impressionism). In 1937, he first bonded in friendship with Jacques Villon.

Demobilized from the army in 1941, Bazaine in the face of the prejudice over Degenerate Art, organized an avant-garde picture show (Galerie Braun Paris 1941) under the heading Vingt Jeunes Peintres de Tradition Française: Estève, Lapique, Pignon were but a few of the artists involved. 1942 was to be the year of his definitive turn towards the abstract - though he would never refer to himself as an abstract painter (Bernier 1955). In 1949/1950, Bazaine had his first major one man show at the Galerie Maeght, who remained his art dealer thenceforth. From then on it was a steady progress of major exhibitions: Bern, Hanover, Zürich, Oslo, and so on. In 1987, Bazaine had a retrospective exhibition in Galerie Maeght, and in 1988, a retrospective of his drawings in the Musée Matisse. And finally in 1990, the Exposition Bazaine in the Galeries Nationales du Grand Palais, Paris., which was accompanied by the reissue of his major texts on painting in art theory as Le temps de la peinture (Paris, Aubier 1990).

However, Bazaine's richest contacts with contemporary master-painters were to be within the specialized field of stained glass.

== Stained glass and mosaic ==
Stained glass by Bazaine in Saint-Séverin (Paris)

In 1937, at the workshop of the glazier Jean Hébert-Stevens, who worked out Bazaine's first stained glass Les Instruments de la Passion for a private chapel, Bazaine came in contact with Georges Rouault and Georges Braque. Rouault and Braque were also designing glass for church windows. In 1943, Bazaine made three windows for the church of Nôtre Dame de Toute Grace at Assy on the subject of saints related to music, at the glazier's workshop of Marguerite Huré, who showed him the tricks of the trade. With those works, he was to figure in the company of Georges Rouault (stained glass), Henri Matisse (mural), Fernand Léger (mosaic), Pierre Bonnard (painting), Marc Chagall (ceramics), and others.

It was Father Couturier who brought Bazaine into the project for the Church of the Sacred Heart at Audincourt (1951), where this time Fernand Léger was to design the stained glass (executed by Jean Barillet); to Bazaine fell the mosaic for the outside wall. Later (1954), he also completed the glazed wall of the baptistery.

The Eglise de Sacré-Cœur d'Audincourt, built in part with the savings of the industrial workers who composed the parish—and who chose the avowed communist Fernand Léger as their creative main interpreter—stands as one of the great monuments of twentieth-century sacred art. The experience left Bazaine with a fond memory of Léger:

It was my first frontwall mosaic (some 75m²). Afterwards I made seven more. Léger, meanwhile, was creating inside over the complete ambulatory a superb monumental suite in glass brick. He was very outspoken, with words that carried the day -So, my old friend- he said to me in front of my mosaic - do you always work in melodies ? This he accompanied with a slap on the shoulder fit to tumble an ox. Of Picasso, who he did not like he said to me: -You who are a writer why don't you tell them he is only small fry. (...de la petite mésure).

More mosaics were to follow: UNESCO Paris 1960, Skissernes Museum Lund 1965, Faculté des Sciences de l'Université de Metz 1977, Hôtel de Ville, Martigues 1981, Salle Clemenceau, Palais du Luxembourg and Métro Cluny-La Sorbonne Paris 1985-1987, Mjällby Konstgard Halmstad 1988–1989 as well as some great series of stained glass windows.

Since his early travels to Brittany, Bazaine had fallen in love with the sea and his series of windows in Finistère are among his best inspired: Penguilly Castle, two windows 1973; Locronan, six windows for the Ty ar Zonj chapel 1977; Penmarc'h, six windows for the Madeleine Chapel 1979–1981.

Among Bazaine's best known stained glass work is a set of seven windows inspired by the sacraments of the Catholic church, in the ambulatory of the ancient church of Saint-Séverin in Paris 1964–1969; executed by Bernard Allain, who also signed for the Brittany windows (with E. Bonte at Penmarc'h).

There were other windows as well as monumental works; tapestries for the Palais de Justice Lille 1969, for the Ecole Navale at Lanvéoc-Poulmic (Finistère) 1973. Chartres stained glass, Bazaine, together with Alfred Manessier founded the Association pour la Défense des Vitraux de France (the "Association for the Defense of France's Stained Glass"). In 1984–1988, Bazaine was master of the works for executing the new windows of the cathedral of Saint-Dié-des-Vosges, for which he assembled an impressive company of painters and master-glaziers. In 1980, he had been created Commandeur des Arts et Lettres.

1993–1995 saw a traveling exhibition of Bazaine's monumental works. In 1996, a great mosaic (15 m × 12 m) was executed for the new church at Concarneau; there were glazed windows for the Chapelle St Dominique - St Matthieu in Paris, a series of works on paper for the Aix Festival and a retrospective at Fribourg.

In 1997, when Jean Bazaine, couleurs et mots - entretiens avec Paul Ricœur et Henri Maldiney appeared, summarizing his career, his monumental mosaic L'Envol de la Liberté on the Mur de la Liberté (Liberty Wall) at Saint-Dié-des-Vosges was being completed.

== Poetry ==
Throughout his career Bazaine kept contact with many poets, some twenty of whom he saluted in Jean Bazaine, couleurs et mots (1997) including Paul Éluard, Abdellatif Laabi, Pierre Lecomte du Noüy, Eugène Guillevic.

Three of them stand out as lifelong friends and soulmates, André Frénaud (whose work has been translated by Keith Bosley), Jean Tardieu, and his own son Jean-Baptiste de Seynes who took his name from his mother Catherine de Seynes-Bazaine.

Bazaine illustrated Raymond Queneau's monograph André Frénaud for Le Divan Editeur, 1960 (150 ex. with an original lithograph, thirty examples hors series with an added lithograph).

Bazaine died at the age of 96 in Clamart at the end of a day's work on a series of collages, a notable example (1995) of which is printed in Jean Bazaine, coleurs et mots (1997) bearing the title L'étape dans la clairière after a cycle of poems by Frénaud (1966).
