= Marie-Alain Couturier =

- Born: Pierre-Charles-Marie Couturier; 15 November 1897
- Died: 9 February 1954 (aged 56)
- Religion: Roman Catholic
- Ordained: 25 July 1930
- Congregations served: Dominican Order

Marie-Alain Couturier, O.P., (15 November 1897 – 9 February 1954) was a French Dominican friar and Catholic priest, who gained fame as a designer of stained glass windows. He was noted for his modern inspiration in the field of Sacred art.

== Life ==
Marie-Alain Couturier was born Pierre-Charles-Marie Couturier in Montbrison, Loire, France, on 15 November 1897. Father Couturier was one of four children born into a relatively wealthy family there. He was their second son, and his early years were spent in Montbrison. He attended the Victor de Laprade Institute, and studied philosophy in a Marist school in Saint-Chamond. He graduated in October 1914, having majored in Literature, Latin, and Greek. His class was called up for military service in 1915, but he did not leave for the front until 1916 on account of his asthmatic condition. In April of that year, he was wounded in the right heel, and was evacuated. On 6 August his foot was operated on in Pau, where he recovered in the hospital until his release in December. Marguerite Perrineau became a close friend of his during that time, and remained a lifelong confidant. In late 1917 he returned to Montbrison, and, with art in mind as a career, began to paint. After the war, he became an art student at the Paris Académie de la Grande Chaumière. Starting in 1920, he spent five years working at the Studio of the Sacred Arts (French: Atelier des Sacrés Arts).

In 1925, he expressed an interest in religious life and began to seek an Order which he might join. He was accepted by the Dominican friars and entered their novitiate in Amiens on 22 September 1925, at which time he took the name under which he is now known.

From 1926 onward he did his theological studies at the Dominican seminary in Le Saulchoir, Belgium, upon completion of which he was ordained a Catholic priest on 25 July 1930. From 1930 to 1932 he studied at the Pontifical University of St. Thomas Aquinas, Angelicum in Rome under famed Dominican theologian Reginald Garrigou-Lagrange. His studies were frequently interrupted by illness. In 1935 he was assigned to the Saint-Honoré Priory in Paris.

He spent World War II overseas in the United States and Canada. Upon his return to Europe after the war, he became involved in several noted artistic projects of the 20th century: Henri Matisse and the Vence Chapel; Le Corbusier and the Chapel of Notre Dame du Haut; the Notre-Dame de Toute Grace du Plateau d'Assy; and Audincourt.

He died of Myastenia gravis on 9 February 1954, aged 56, mourned by many of the great 20th-century artists.

== Sacred art ==
From 1936 till 1954 Father Couturier, together with Father Pie-Raymond Régamey, was the chief editor of the review L'Art Sacré that was to become very influential among art critics no longer satisfied with what was considered outdated 19th-century church decoration. Father Couturier, who had received a thorough and practical training as an artisan glazier at the Ateliers, was then considering to bring "living" art into the scope of modern church building. With Maurice Denis he was responsible for the first abstract stained glass windows in the church of Le Raincy, built by Auguste Perret in 1923.

The Austrian priest Otto Mauer, in the same period, was working along the same lines with the Austrian Avant-Garde, opening the Galerie nächst St Stephan for the very purpose. Alfred Kubin and Arnulf Rainer, among others became great friends of Mauer, just like some of the most outspoken freethinkers such as Fernand Léger and Henri Matisse became intimate friends with Father Couturier.

The general idea for these ground-breaking clerical artists was that there was no religious denomination for art. "What is more real? The torments of the figure of Christ or the beautiful expensive necklace you are wearing?" the priest asked a parishioner who was criticizing the novel way in which Germaine Richier had symbolised the Christ in Agony in the new church at Assy. Another example: "But don't you know I am a Jew?" Jacques Lipchitz had asked Father Couturier, when commissioned to deliver the sculpture of the Virgin Mary for Assy. "If it does not bother you, it does not bother me" was the answer.

Contributing to the spirit of great art that led to the Couturier's inspiration were:

- The stained glass windows of Alfred Manessier for the church of Sainte-Agathe des Bréseux (1948) -the first non figurative designs to be incorporated in an ancient building, Father Couturier himself signing for the window celebrating St Theresa
- The Chapelle du Saint-Marie du Rosaire by Henri Matisse (1949-1951).
- The Chapel of Notre Dame du Haut by Le Corbusier (1954)
- The Church of Notre-Dame de Toute Grâce du Plateau d'Assy, bringing together Braque, Matisse, Bonnard, Lurçat, Rouault, Léger, Bazaine, Chagall, Berçot, Briançon, Richier... (1938-1949)
- The Church of Sacré Cœur d'Audincourt: stained glass by Fernand Léger, mosaic and stained glass by Jean Bazaine, stained glass (crypte) by Jean Le Moal (1955)
- The convent Sainte Marie de La Tourette at Eveux-sur-l'Arbresle (near Lyon) by Le Corbusier, 1960
- The Rothko Chapel, celebrating the inspiring talks between Dominique de Menil and Father Couturier.

The annual exhibition, Salon Art Sacré (sacred art) was founded in 1951 by Couturier, along with his fellow Dominican friar Pie-Raymond Régamey and the lay artist Joseph Pichard. They wanted to revitalize the sacred meaning in art. Supported by Andre Malraux in the 1960, the show reached its artistic heyday with the Salon Art et Matière (Art and Matter) which targeted a so-called secular spirituality. In 1989, the noted artist Pierre Heymann began to contribute to the exhibition.

This exhibition changed its name to SAESAM in 1994. Currently it maintains an online presence as a forum for artists to share their work and ideas connected to spirituality.

== Stained glass ==
In the art of stained glass a distinction has to be made between the artisan master-glazier and the designer, the cartoneur, who makes the cardboard maquettes of the artwork. (Special scissors are used on the cardboard that cut away strips corresponding to the soul of the leadstrip (H -came) in which the master-glazier assembles the colored glass fragments). Georges Rouault, Henri Matisse, Fernand Léger, Alfred Manessier, Jean Bazaine, Jean Le Moal are but a few of the master-painters designing for stained glass (cartoneurs) in company with Father Couturier.

Jean Hébert-Stevens, Marguerite Huré, Jean Barillet -again in company with Father Couturier, master-glazier as well as designer- are but some of the artisans whose name are linked to the renewal inspired by Father Couturier.

In 1925 Jean Hébert-Stevens and Pauline Paugniez opened a workshop where glaziers and painters shared projects, inspired by the Ateliers d'Art Sacré initiated by Maurice Denis (1919). It was Marguerite Huré who signed for the execution of the glasswork designed by Maurice Denis and Pierre (Marie-Alain) Couturier for the church in Le Raincy in 1923. Jean Barrilet, around the same time was responsible for the creation of the workshop "The artisans of the altar".(Danièle Doumont, 2003 -ref below)

One seems to better understand the spiritual appeal of the artisans -of Father Couturiers message- when one concentrates on the symbolism of the cohesive function of the soul in multicolored illumination, a central feature in traditional artwork.
