= Ladislas Kijno =

French painter (1921–2012)

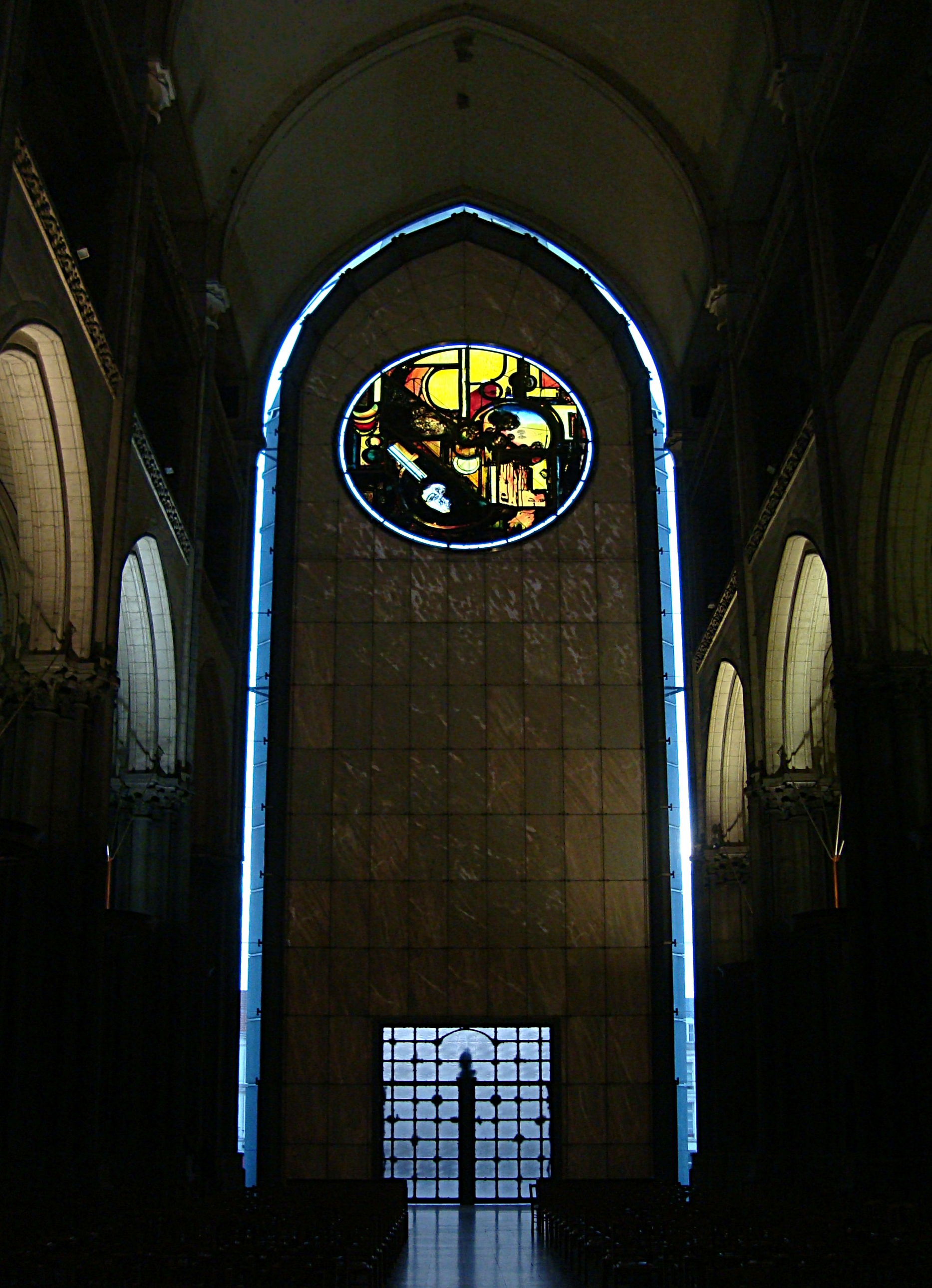
The porch of Notre-Dame de la Treille in Lille. The domed cover has a circular stained glass designed by Ladislaus Kijno in 2008

Ladislas Kijno (June 27, 1921 – November 27, 2012) was a French painter.

== Biography ==
Born in Warsaw, he moved with his family to France in 1925, settling in the community of Nœux-les-Mines in the Pas-de-Calais. Before becoming a painter he studied philosophy with Jean Grenier.

In 1991, the French magazine L'Amateur d'Art was devoted to him, with an interview with Jean-Pierre Thiollet entitled "Ladislas Kijno: 'Je suis un moine de l'Art!'" (I'm an Art Monk!)
