= Gaby Charroux =

French politician

Deputy for Bouches-du-Rhône's 13th constituency in the National Assembly of France
- Preceded by: Alain Aragneau
- Succeeded by: Pierre Dharréville

Personal details
- Born: 25 June 1942 (age 83) Algiers, French Algeria
- Party: French Communist Party

Gaby Charroux (born 1942) is a French politician.

== Early life ==
Gaby Charroux was born on 25 June 1942 in Algiers, French Algeria.

== Career ==
Charroux was a schoolteacher.

Charroux is a member of the French Communist Party. He served as Michel Vaxès's parliamentary assistant. He served as a member of the National Assembly from 2012 to 2017, representing Bouches-du-Rhône's 13th constituency. In May 2016, he co-sponsored a bill to cap the salaries of top executives in private corporations.

Charroux also serves as the mayor of Martigues. In July 2016, he tried to expel Roma people, in vain.
