= Maurice Novarina =

French architect (1907–2002)

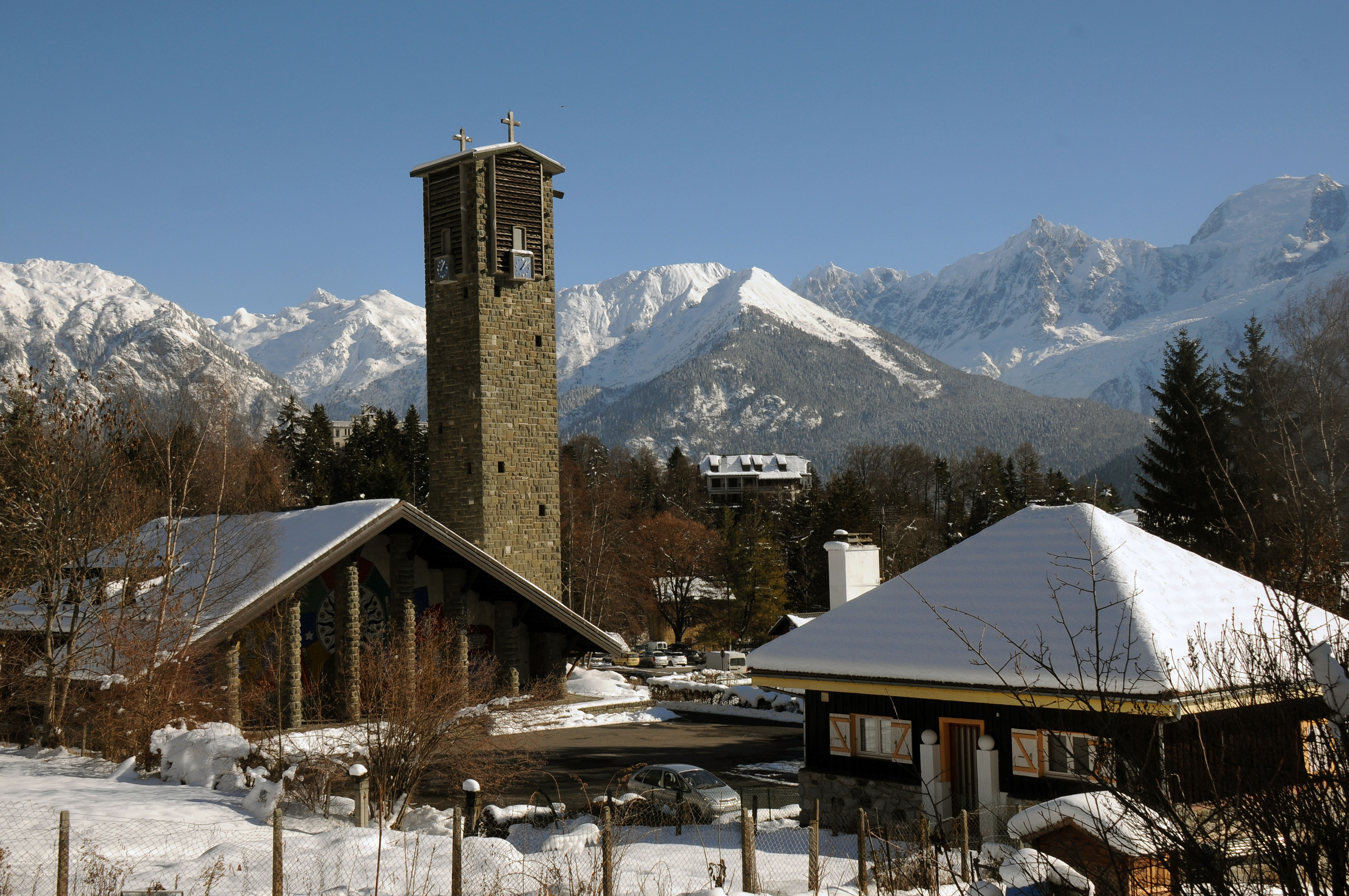
Notre-Dame de Toute Grâce du Plateau d'Assy

Maurice Novarina (28 June 1907 – 28 September 2002) was a French architect; born in Thonon-les-Bains, in Haute-Savoie, he died in the town of his birth.

He is known for having designed the church of Notre-Dame de Toute Grâce du Plateau d'Assy. He was a student of the École nationale supérieure des Beaux-Arts, and later became an engineer of public works. Elected to the Académie des Beaux-Arts in 1979, he was succeeded by Aymeric Zublena in 2008.

In 2007 the water towers of Alençon, which he designed in 1964 were labelled as Architecture contemporaine remarquable.

Novarina had two sons: Patrice Novarina became an architect, while Valère Novarina is a writer.
