= Michel Vaxès =

French politician

- Born: November 14, 1940; Marseille, Bouches-du-Rhône, Provence-Alpes-Côte d'Azur, France
- Died: September 18, 2016 (aged 75)
- Occupation: Politician
- Political party: French Communist Party
- Spouse: Renée Vaxès
- Children: 2 sons

Michel Vaxès (November 14, 1940 – September 18, 2016) was a French politician.

== Early life ==
Michel Vaxès was born on November 14, 1940, in Marseille, Southern France.

== Career ==
Vaxès was a school counsellor.

Vaxès was a member of the French Communist Party. He served on the city council of Port-de-Bouc, and eventually served as its mayor. He also served as a member of the National Assembly of France from 1997 to 2012, representing the Bouches-du-Rhône department. His parliamentary assistant was Gaby Charroux, who subsequently won his seat in the assembly. In 2003, in the midst of his tenure, he tried to remove the word "race" from the Constitution of France, unsuccessfully.

== Personal life and death ==
Vaxès was married to Renée Vaxès. He had two sons, Erick and Yann. He died of cancer on September 18, 2016. He was 75 years old.
