= Martigues =

Commune in Provence-Alpes-Côte d'Azur, France

Martigues Lo Martegue (Occitan)
- Commune
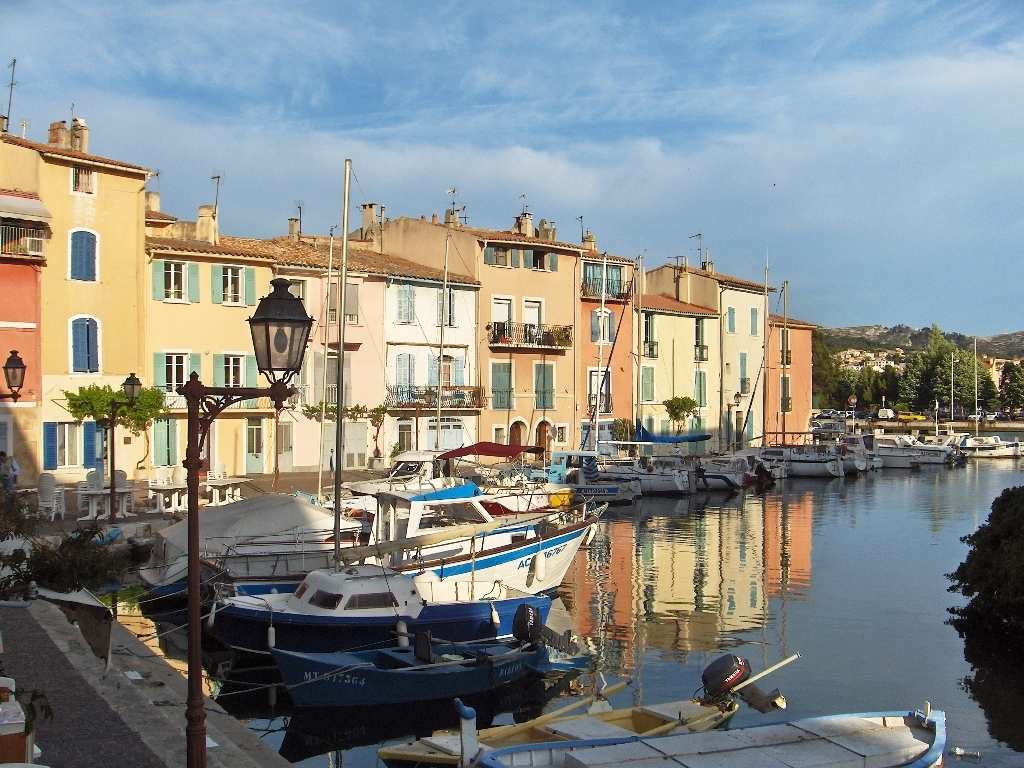
- Le Miroir aux oiseaux (Bird Mirror) area

- Coat of arms
- Location of Martigues
- Location within France Location within Provence-Alpes-Côte d'Azur
- Coordinates: 43°24′19″N 5°02′51″E
- Country: France
- Region: Provence-Alpes-Côte d'Azur
- Department: Bouches-du-Rhône
- Arrondissement: Istres
- Canton: Martigues
- Intercommunality: Aix-Marseille-Provence

Government
  - Mayor (2026–32): Gaby Charroux
- Area^{1}: 71.44 km^{2} (27.58 sq mi)
- Elevation: 1 m (3.3 ft)
- Highest elevation: 187 m (614 ft)
- Lowest elevation: 0 m (0 ft)
- Population (2023): 48,298
  - Density: 676.1/km^{2} (1,751/sq mi)
- Time zone: UTC+01:00 (CET)
  - Summer (DST): UTC+02:00 (CEST)
- INSEE/Postal code: 13056 /13500
- Website: ville-martigues.fr
- ^{1} French Land Register data, which excludes lakes, ponds, glaciers > 1 km^{2} (0.386 sq mi or 247 acres) and river estuaries.

Martigues (Occitan: Lo Martegue in classical norm, Lou Martegue in Mistralian norm) is a commune northwest of Marseille. It is part of the Bouches-du-Rhône department in the Provence-Alpes-Côte d'Azur region on the eastern end of the Canal de Caronte.

A direct translation from the Martigues Tourisme website states the following about Martigues:

Nicknamed the "Provençale Venice", Martigues is a point of passage between the Mediterranean Sea and the Sea of Martigues (now Etang de Berre), close to the Côte d'Azur. The charm of its canals, its docks and bridges made it "The Venice of Provence". Martigues possesses also its cooperative winery "La Venise provençale": Coteaux d'Aix en Provence, rosé, red and white wines, fruit juices and natural oils in the region. Main varietals: Grenache, Syrah, Cinsault, Carignan, Clairette.

== History ==
Martigues was founded by Ramon Berenguer IV, count of Provence in 1232 on the likely site of the Roman camp Maritima Avaticorum.

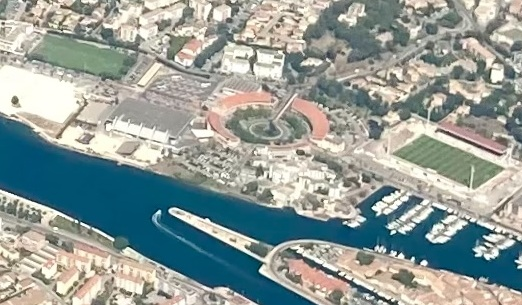
The Hôtel de Ville

The Hôtel de Ville was built on the former salt marshes and completed in 1983.

== Population ==
Historical population

| Year | Pop. | ±% p.a. |
|---|---|---|
| 1793 | 6,695 | — |
| 1800 | 6,869 | +0.37% |
| 1806 | 6,888 | +0.05% |
| 1821 | 7,255 | +0.35% |
| 1831 | 7,438 | +0.25% |
| 1836 | 7,299 | −0.38% |
| 1841 | 7,772 | +1.26% |
| 1846 | 7,873 | +0.26% |
| 1851 | 8,640 | +1.88% |
| 1856 | 8,099 | −1.28% |
| 1861 | 8,433 | +0.81% |
| 1866 | 8,011 | −1.02% |
| 1872 | 8,053 | +0.09% |
| 1876 | 6,963 | −3.57% |
| 1881 | 6,483 | −1.42% |
| 1886 | 6,494 | +0.03% |
| 1891 | 5,918 | −1.84% |
| 1896 | 5,659 | −0.89% |
| 1901 | 6,280 | +2.10% |

| Year | Pop. | ±% p.a. |
|---|---|---|
| 1906 | 5,734 | −1.80% |
| 1911 | 7,450 | +5.38% |
| 1921 | 6,304 | −1.66% |
| 1926 | 8,876 | +7.08% |
| 1931 | 9,394 | +1.14% |
| 1936 | 10,489 | +2.23% |
| 1946 | 11,295 | +0.74% |
| 1954 | 15,150 | +3.74% |
| 1962 | 21,515 | +4.48% |
| 1968 | 27,945 | +4.45% |
| 1975 | 38,373 | +4.63% |
| 1982 | 42,037 | +1.31% |
| 1990 | 42,678 | +0.19% |
| 1999 | 43,497 | +0.21% |
| 2007 | 46,247 | +0.77% |
| 2012 | 47,624 | +0.59% |
| 2017 | 48,188 | +0.24% |
| 2023 | 48,298 | +0.04% |

Source: EHESS and INSEE (1968-2023)

== Transport ==
The Gare de Martigues railway station is served by regional trains between Miramas and Marseille.

The nearest airport is Marseille Provence Airport (MRS), which is 14.52 km (9 miles) away.

CroisiEurope runs river cruises between Martigues (dock near Avenue Louis Sammut, behind City Hall) and either Lyon or Chalon-sur-Saône.

== People ==
- Augustus John, Welsh painter and etcher
- Gerard Thom (Frère Gérard), founder of the Knights Hospitaller
- Etienne Auteman / Authement, City Attorney 1700
- Étienne Richaud (1841-1889), Principal private secretary (Gambetta's Ministry), Governor of La Réunion, Governor General for Inde française
- Charles Maurras (1868-1952), poet and political theorist
- Éric Bernard, Formula-1 driver
- Jimmy Abdou, footballer
- Ali Ahamada, footballer
- Maurice Dalé, footballer
- Rod Fanni, footballer
- Foued Kadir, footballer
- André-Pierre Gignac, footballer
- Clara Luciani, singer
- Amor Kehiha, footballer
- Imany, singer
- Giacomo and Gilles Coustellier, both multiple mountainbike trials world champions
- Yusuf Sari, footballer
- Philippe Didier Prout, firefighter
- Andre-Pierre Gignac, French, Mexican footballer

== Sport ==
The 1st stage of the 2024 Tour de la Provence finished at Martigues on the 9th of Feb.

== See also ==
- FC Martigues - Local football club.
- Étang de Berre
- Communes of the Bouches-du-Rhône department
- Maison du chemin de Paradis
- Tamaris (archaeological site)
