= Claude Monet =

French painter (1840–1926)

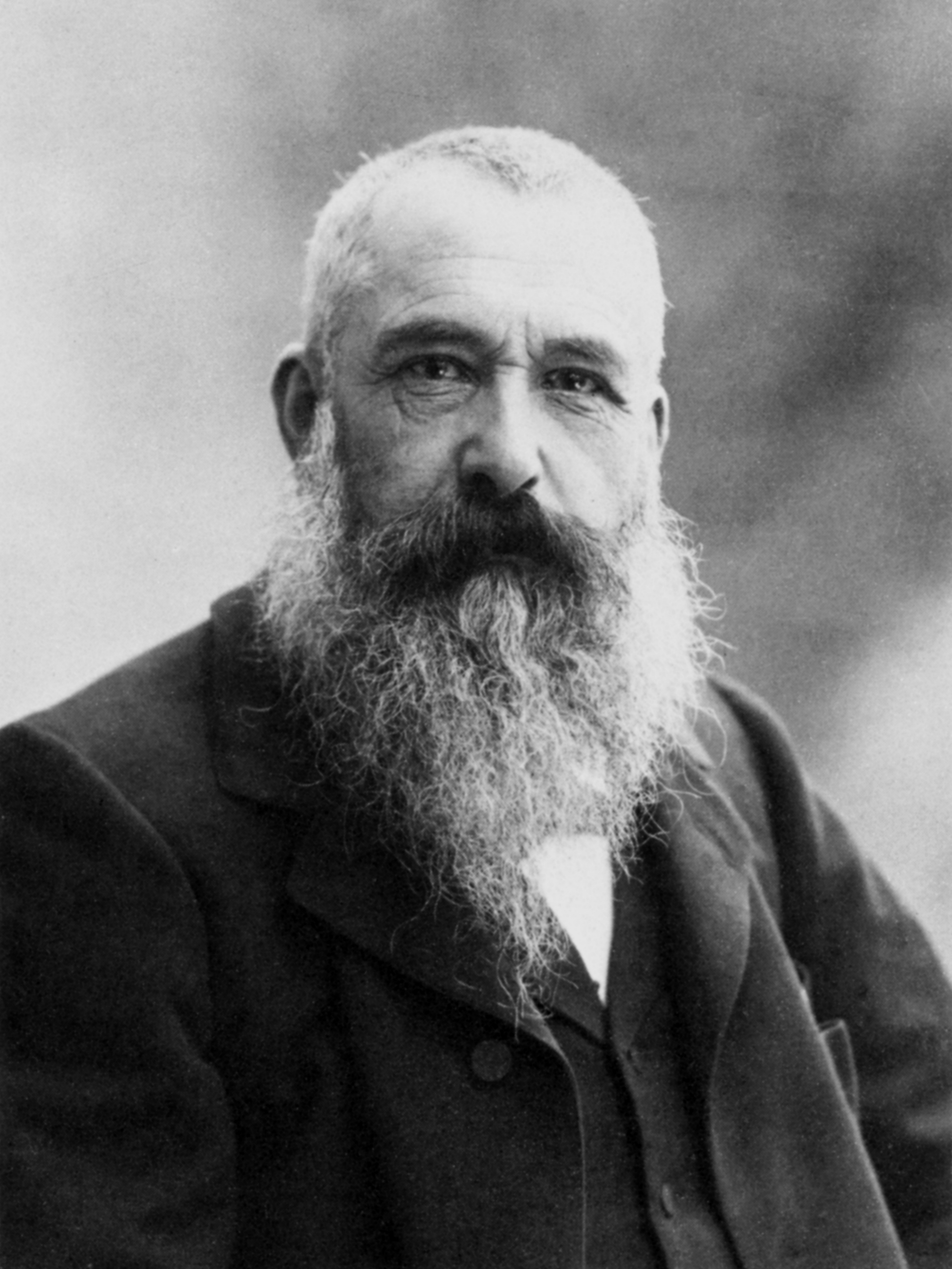
- Monet in c. 1899
- Born: Oscar-Claude Monet; 14 November 1840; Paris, France
- Died: 5 December 1926 (aged 86); Giverny, France
- Education: Académie Suisse; Beaux-Arts de Paris
- Years active: 1865–1926
- Known for: Painting
- Notable work: Impression, Sunrise; Rouen Cathedral series; London Parliament series; Water Lilies; Haystacks; Poplars; List of paintings
- Movement: Impressionism
- Spouses: Camille Doncieux (m. 1870; died 1879); Alice Hoschedé (m. 1892; died 1911)
- Children: Jean; Michel
- Patrons: Gustave Caillebotte; Ernest Hoschedé; Georges Clemenceau; Sergei Shchukin

Oscar-Claude Monet (UK: /ˈmɒneɪ/, US: /moʊˈneɪ, məˈ-/; French: [klod mɔnɛ]; 14 November 1840 – 5 December 1926) was a French painter and founder of Impressionism who is seen as a key precursor to modernism, especially in his attempts to paint nature as he perceived it. During his long career, he was the most consistent and prolific practitioner of Impressionism's philosophy of expressing one's perceptions of nature, especially as applied to plein air (outdoor) landscape painting. The term "Impressionism" is derived from the title of his painting Impression, Sunrise (Impression, soleil levant), which was exhibited in 1874 at the First Impressionist Exhibition, initiated by Monet and a number of like-minded artists as an alternative to the Salon.

Monet was raised in Le Havre, Normandy, and became interested in the outdoors and drawing from an early age. Although his mother, Louise-Justine Aubrée Monet, supported his ambitions to be a painter, his father, Claude-Adolphe, disapproved and wanted him to pursue a career in business. He was very close to his mother, but she died in January 1857 when he was sixteen years old, and he was sent to live with his childless, widowed but wealthy aunt, Marie-Jeanne Lecadre. He went on to study at the Académie Suisse, and under the academic history painter Charles Gleyre, where he was a classmate of Auguste Renoir. His early works include landscapes, seascapes, and portraits, but attracted little attention. A key early influence was Eugène Boudin, who introduced him to the concept of plein air painting. From 1883, Monet lived in Giverny, also in northern France, where he purchased a house and property and began a vast landscaping project, including a water-lily pond.

Monet's ambition to document the French countryside led to a method of painting the same scene many times so as to capture the changing of light and the passing of the seasons. Among the best-known examples are his series of haystacks (1890–1891), paintings of Rouen Cathedral (1892–1894), and the paintings of water lilies in his garden in Giverny, which occupied him for the last 20 years of his life. Frequently exhibited and successful during his lifetime, Monet's fame and popularity soared in the second half of the 20th century when he became one of the world's most famous painters and a source of inspiration for a burgeoning group of artists.

== Biography ==
=== Birth and childhood ===
Claude Monet was born on 14 November 1840, on the fifth floor of 45 rue Laffitte in the 9th arrondissement of Paris. He was the second son of Claude Adolphe Monet (1800–1871) and Louise Justine Aubrée Monet (1805–1857), both of them second-generation Parisians. On 20 May 1841, he was baptised in the local Paris church, Notre-Dame-de-Lorette, as Oscar-Claude, but his parents called him simply Oscar. Although baptised Catholic, Monet later became an atheist. In 1845, his family moved to Le Havre in Normandy. His father, a wholesale merchant, wanted him to go into the family's ship-chandling and grocery business, but Monet wanted to become an artist. His mother was a singer, and supported Monet's desire for a career in art.

On 1 April 1851, he entered Le Havre secondary school of the arts. He was an apathetic student who, after showing skill in art from a young age, began drawing caricatures and portraits of acquaintances at age 15 for money. He began his first drawing lessons from Jacques-François Ochard, a former student of Jacques-Louis David. In around 1858, he met fellow artist Eugène Boudin, who encouraged Monet to develop his technique, taught him the "en plein air" (outdoor) approach and took him on painting excursions. Monet thought of Boudin as his master, whom "he owed everything to" for his later success. In 1857, his mother died. He lived with his father and aunt, Marie-Jeanne Lecadre; Lecadre would be a source of support for Monet in his early art career.

=== First stay in Paris (1859-1860) ===
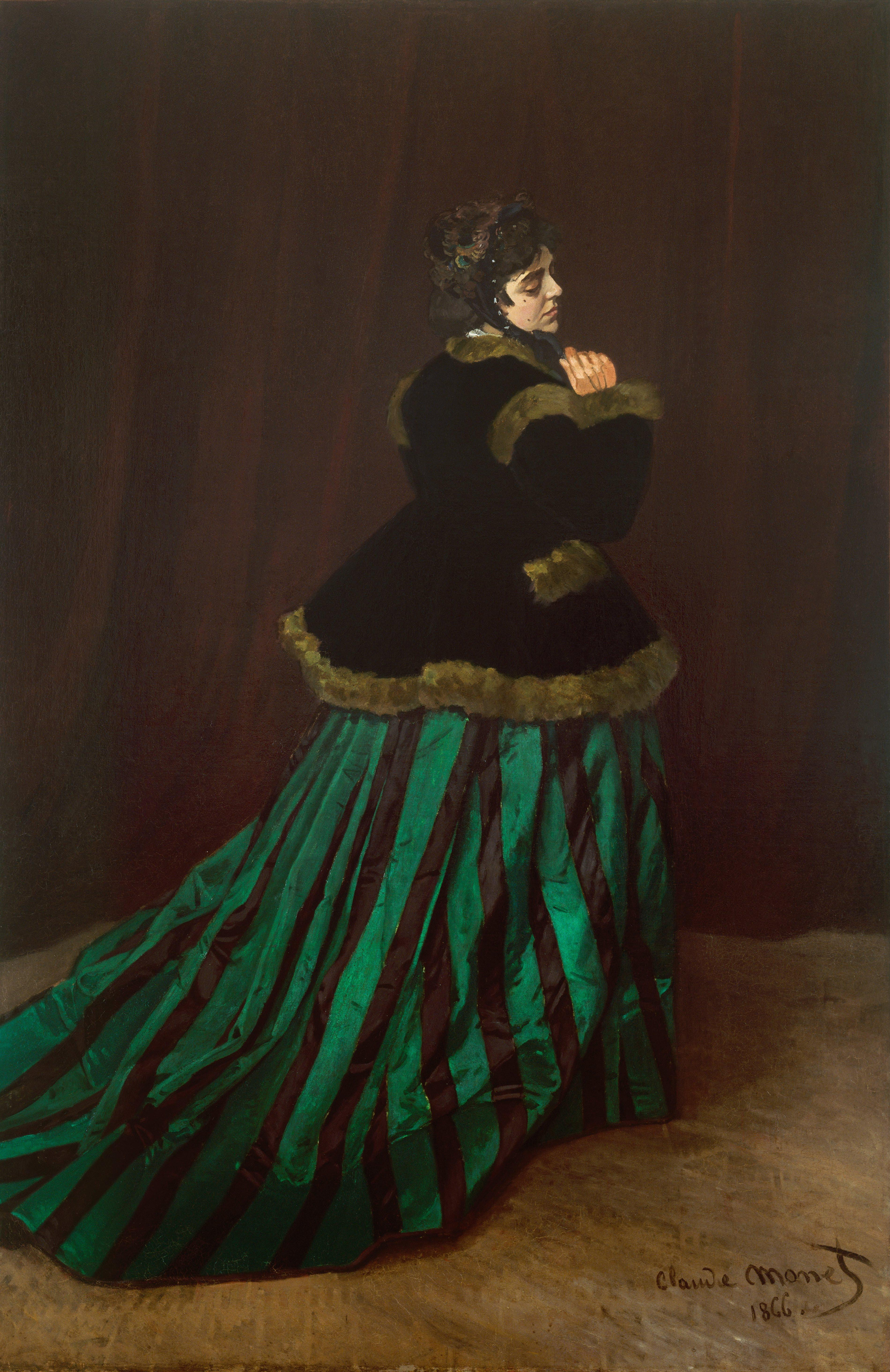
The Woman in the Green Dress, Camille Doncieux, 1866, Kunsthalle Bremen

Claude Monet arrived in Paris in April 1859 and settled into the Hôtel du Nouveau Monde, Place du Havre. He immediately visited the Salon which had just opened. Then he was welcomed by Armand Gautier, a friend of his aunt Jeanne Lecadre. The latter paid him a regular pension and managed his savings of around 2,000 francs which he had accumulated through the sale of his drawings. They would be precious to him because his father had applied for a grant from the city of Le Havre, on 6 August 1858, but he was refused. He also visited Charles Lhuillier, Charles Monginot and Constant Troyon. The latter two advised him to enter the studio of Thomas Couture, who was preparing for the École des Beaux-Arts. However, the latter refused the young Monet. At the beginning of 1860, probably in February, he entered the Académie Suisse, located on the Île de la Cité, which was directed by Charles Suisse. There he met Camille Pissarro in particular. At the Salon that year, he particularly admired the works of Eugène Delacroix, the previous year it was Charles-François Daubigny who had attracted his attention. This first stay was not, however, devoted only to work. Indeed, Claude spent a significant part of his time in Parisian cafés and more particularly at the Brasserie des Martyrs, then a popular meeting place for authors and artists.

On 2 March 1861, the 20-year-old Monet was drawn at Le Havre to be conscripted into the army. Certainly, his family could have paid the cost of 2,500 francs for a substitute, but while initially Monet claimed in 1900 that they required in return that he renounce his artistic career to take over the family business, by the 1920s he had changed this to him having to become a "selon la norme" (normal artist). Monet refused and so enlisted for seven years with the 1st Regiment of Chasseurs d'Afrique on 29 April 1861. The army records described him as being in good health, 165 cm (5 ft 5 in), with brown hair and chestnut eyes. In June 1861, he crossed Algeria to join his regiment in Mustapha. Prior to this he had never been further from Normandy than Paris and had never ridden a horse. In the spring of 1862, he contracted typhoid fever and was allowed to return to Le Havre during the summer to recuperate with his aunt, Jeanne Lecadre in Sainte-Adresse, Normandy. While there he met Eugène Boudin again. His aunt agreed to discharge him from the army and pay the 3,025 francs.

While painting during the summer of 1862, near Cap de la Héve he was introduced to and became friends with the Dutch painter Johan Jongkind, who together with Boudin was an important mentor to Monet. He received his good conduct discharge on 21 November 1862. Despite the experiences that Monet had in Algeria, which may have seemed unpleasant, he generally remembered it well. His time in Algeria had a powerful effect on Monet, who later said that the light and vivid colours of North Africa "contained the gem of my future researches". He also told Gustave Geffroy: "It did me the greatest good in every way and put some lead in my head. I thought only of painting, intoxicated as I was by this admirable country, and I now had the full approval of my family who saw me so full of ardor."

=== Return to Paris ===
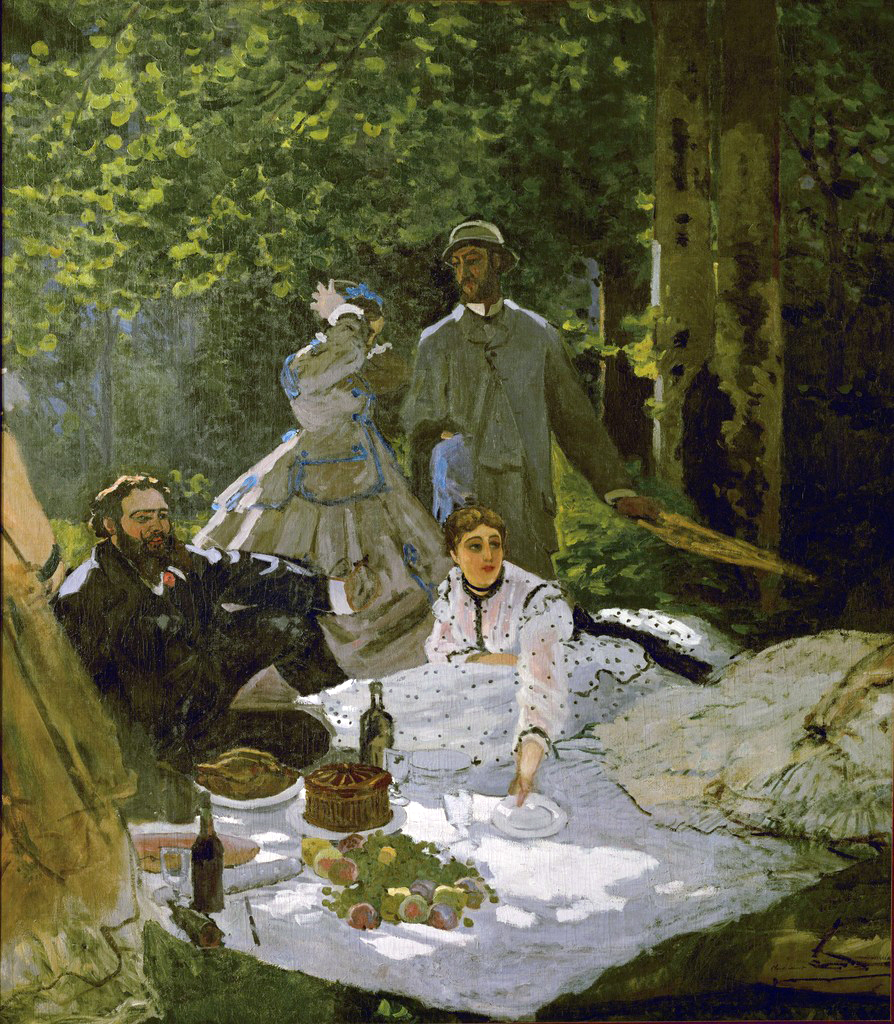
Le déjeuner sur l'herbe (right-hand section), 1865–1866, Paris, with Gustave Courbet, Frédéric Bazille and Camille Doncieux, first wife of the artist, Musée d'Orsay

Monet returned to Paris in December 1862, where he enrolled in Charles Gleyre studio, the École impériale des beaux-arts de Paris at 70 rue Notre-Dame-des-Champs due to the recommendations of his cousin by marriage Auguste Toulmouche. However he ended up leaving Gleyre's studio, as they disagreed on the method of presenting nature. While here he met Pierre-Auguste Renoir and Frédéric Bazille. Bazille eventually became his closest friend. In search of motifs, they travelled to Honfleur where Monet painted several "studies" of the harbour and the mouth of the Seine. Monet often painted alongside Renoir and Alfred Sisley, both of whom shared his desire to articulate new standards of beauty in conventional subjects.

During this time he painted Women in Garden, his first successful large-scale painting, and Le déjeuner sur l'herbe, the "most important painting of Monet's early period". Having debuted at the Salon in 1865 with La Pointe de la Hève at Low Tide and Mouth of the Seine at Honfleur to large praise, he hoped Le déjeuner sur l'herbe would help him break through into the Salon of 1866. He could not finish it in a timely manner and instead submitted The Woman in the Green Dress and Pavé de Chailly to acceptance. Thereafter, he submitted works to the Salon annually until 1870, but they were accepted by the juries only twice, in 1866 and 1868. He sent no more works to the Salon until his single, final attempt in 1880. His work was considered radical, "discouraged at all official levels".

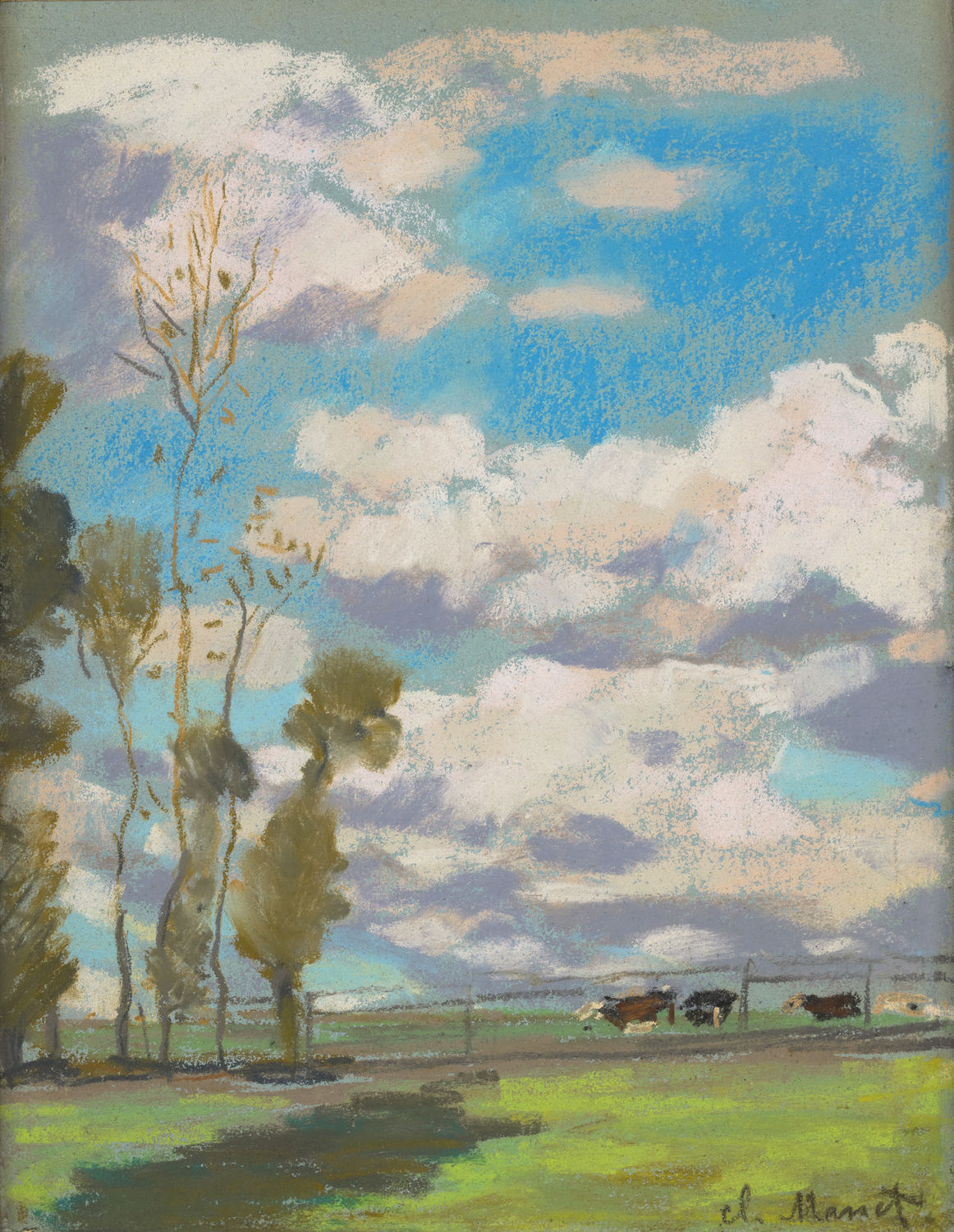
Three Cows Grazing, 1868, pastel on paper

In 1867 his then-mistress, Camille Doncieux—whom he had met two years earlier as a model for his paintings—gave birth to their first child, Jean. Monet had a strong relationship with Jean, claiming that Camille was his lawful wife so Jean would be considered legitimate. Monet's father stopped financially supporting him as a result of the relationship. Earlier in the year Monet had been forced to move to his aunt's house in Sainte-Adresse. There he immersed himself in his work, although a temporary problem with his eyesight, probably related to stress, prevented him from working in sunlight. Monet loved his family dearly, painting many portraits of them such as Child With a Cup, a Portrait of Jean Monet. This painting in particular shows the first signs of Monets' later famous impressionistic work.

With help from the art collector Louis-Joachim Gaudibert, he reunited with Camille and moved to Étretat the following year. Around this time, he was trying to establish himself as a figure painter who depicted the "explicitly contemporary, bourgeois", an intention that continued into the 1870s. He did evolve his painting technique and integrate stylistic experimentation in his plein-air style—as evidenced by The Beach at Sainte-Adresse and On the Bank of the Seine respectively, the former being his "first sustained campaign of painting that involved tourism".

Several of his paintings had been purchased by Gaudibert, who commissioned a painting of his wife, alongside other projects; the Gaudiberts were for two years "the most supportive of Monet's hometown patrons". Monet would later be financially supported by the artist and art collector Gustave Caillebotte, Bazille and perhaps Gustave Courbet, although creditors still pursued him.

=== Exile and Argenteuil ===
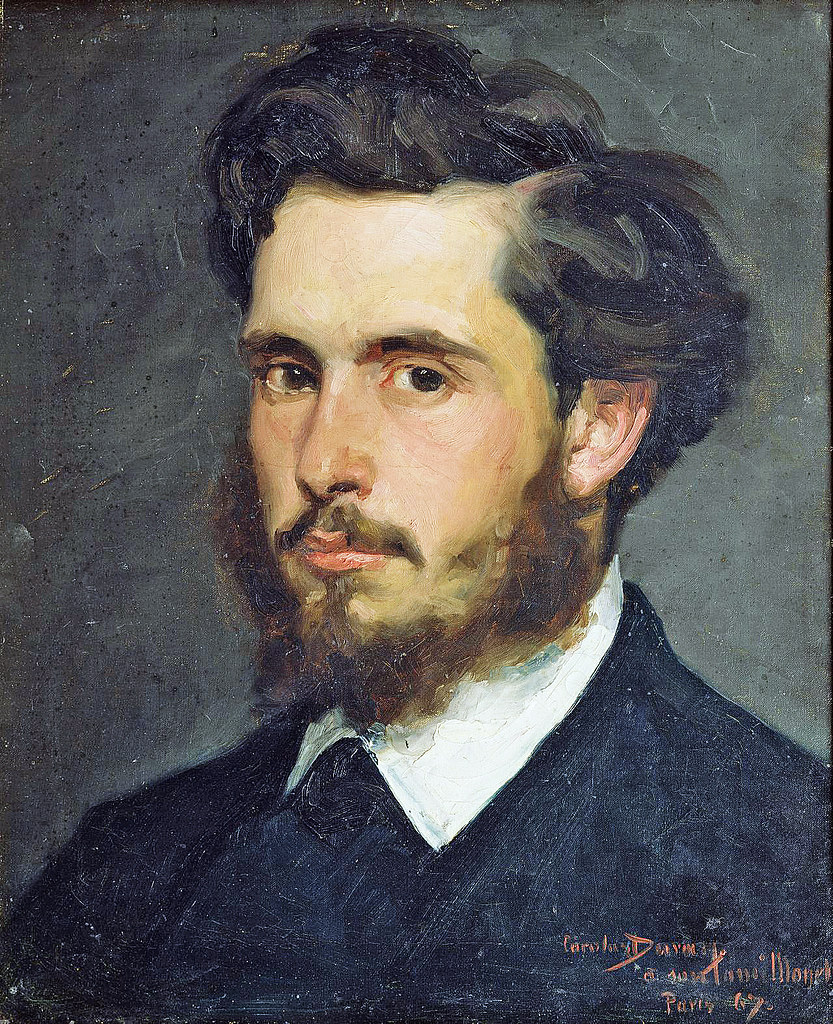
Portrait of Claude Monet, Carolus-Duran, c. 1867

He married Camille on 28 June 1870, just before the outbreak of the Franco-Prussian War. During the war, he and his family lived in London and the Netherlands to avoid conscription. Monet and Charles-François Daubigny lived in self-imposed exile. (Note: The exile has conversely been described as forceful.) While living in London, Monet met his old friend Pissarro and the American painter James Abbott McNeill Whistler, and befriended his first and primary art dealer, Paul Durand-Ruel, an encounter that would be decisive for his career. There he saw and admired the works of John Constable and J. M. W. Turner and was impressed by Turner's treatment of light, especially in the works depicting the fog on the Thames. He repeatedly painted the Thames, Hyde Park and Green Park. In the spring of 1871, his works were refused authorisation for inclusion in the Royal Academy exhibition and police suspected him of revolutionary activities. That same year he learned of his father's death.

The family moved to Argenteuil in 1871, where he, influenced by his time with Dutch painters, mostly painted the Seine's surrounding area. He acquired a sailboat to paint on the river. In 1874, he signed a six-and-a-half year lease and moved into a newly built "rose-colored house with green shutters" in Argenteuil, where he painted fifteen paintings of his garden from a panoramic perspective. Paintings such as Gladioli marked what was likely the first time Monet had cultivated a garden for the purpose of his art. The house and garden became the "single most important" motif of his final years in Argenteuil. For the next four years, he painted mostly in Argenteuil and took an interest in the colour theories of chemist Michel Eugène Chevreul. For three years of the decade, he rented a large villa in Saint-Denis for a thousand francs per year. Camille Monet on a Garden Bench displays the garden of the villa, and what some have argued to be Camille's grief upon learning of her father's death.

Monet and Camille were often in financial straits during this period—they were unable to pay their hotel bill during the summer of 1870 and likely lived on the outskirts of London as a result of insufficient funds. An inheritance from his father, together with sales of his paintings, did, however, enable them to hire two servants and a gardener by 1872. Following the successful exhibition of some maritime paintings and the winning of a silver medal at Le Havre, Monet's paintings were seized by creditors, from whom they were bought back by a shipping merchant, Gaudibert, who was also a patron of Boudin.

=== Impressionism ===
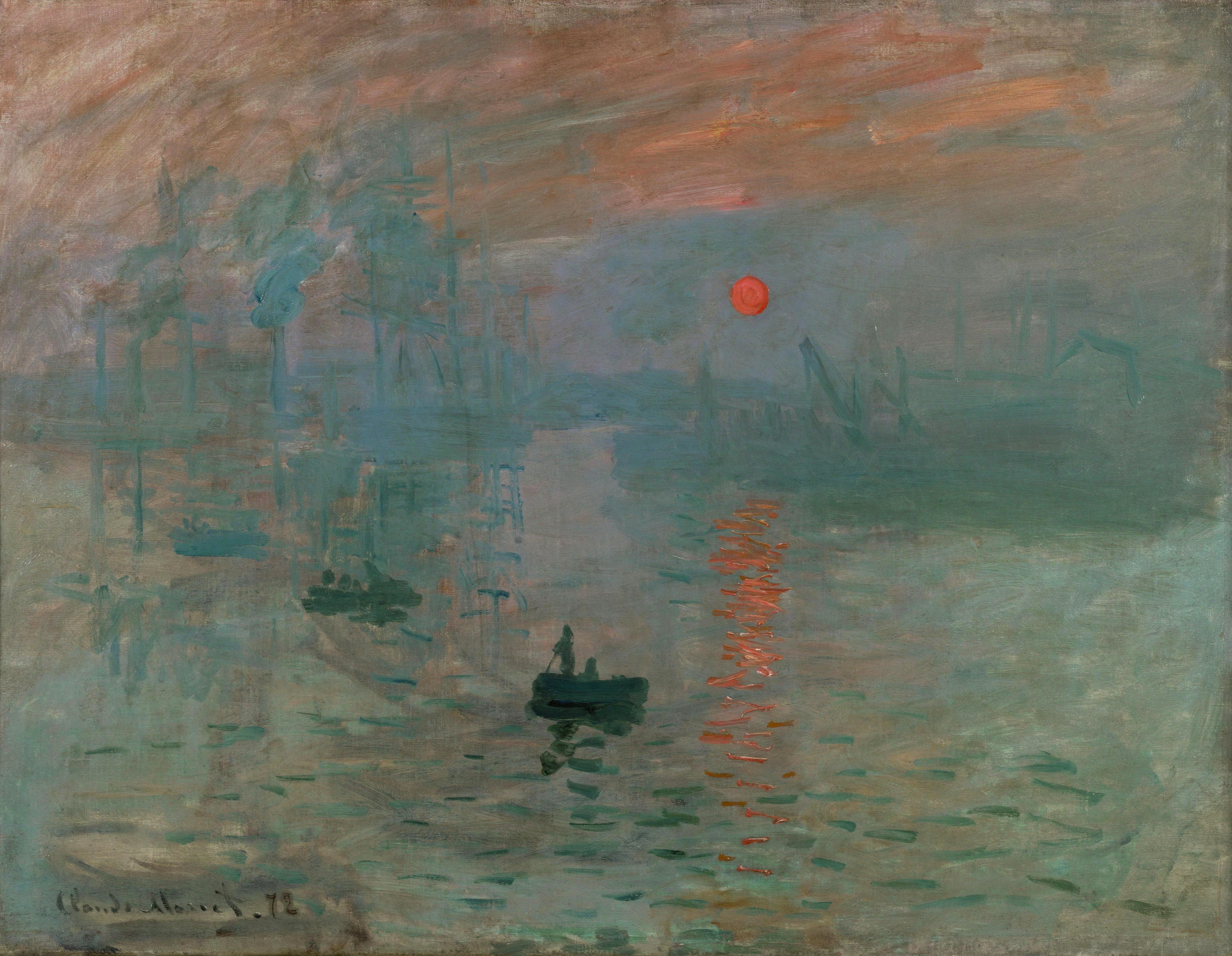
Impression, Sunrise (Impression, soleil levant), 1872; the painting that gave its name to the style and artistic movement. Musée Marmottan Monet, Paris

When Durand-Ruel's previous support of Monet and his peers began to decline, Monet, Renoir, Pissarro, Sisley, Paul Cézanne, Edgar Degas, and Berthe Morisot exhibited their work independently; they did so under the name the Anonymous Society of Painters, Sculptors and Engravers for which Monet was a leading figure in its formation. He was inspired by the style and subject matter of his slightly older contemporaries, Pissarro and Édouard Manet. The group, whose title was chosen to avoid association with any style or movement, were unified in their independence from the Salon and rejection of the prevailing academicism. Monet gained a reputation as the foremost landscape painter of the group.

At the first exhibition, in 1874, Monet displayed, among others, Impression, Sunrise, The Luncheon and Boulevard des Capucines. The art critic Louis Leroy wrote a hostile review. Taking particular notice of Impression, Sunrise (1872), a hazy depiction of Le Havre port and stylistic detour, he coined the term "Impressionism". Conservative critics and the public derided the group, with the term initially being ironic and denoting the painting as unfinished. More progressive critics praised the depiction of modern life—Louis Edmond Duranty called their style a "revolution in painting". Leroy later regretted inspiring the name, as he believed that they were a group "whose majority had nothing impressionist".

The total attendance is estimated at 3,500. Monet priced Impression: Sunrise at 1,000 francs, but failed to sell it. The exhibition was open to anyone prepared to pay 60 francs and gave artists the opportunity to show their work without the interference of a jury. Another exhibition was held in 1876, again in opposition to the Salon. Monet displayed 18 paintings, including The Beach at Sainte-Adresse which showcased multiple Impressionist characteristics.

For the third exhibition, on 5 April 1877, he selected seven paintings from the dozen he had made of Gare Saint-Lazare in the past three months, the first time he had "synced as many paintings of the same site, carefully coordinating their scenes and temporalities". The paintings were well received by critics, who especially praised the way he captured the arrival and departures of the trains. By the fourth exhibition, his involvement was by means of negotiation on Caillebotte's part. His last time exhibiting with the Impressionists was in 1882—four years before the final Impressionist exhibition.

Monet, Renoir, Pissarro, Morisot, Cézanne and Sisley proceeded to experiment with new methods of depicting reality. They rejected the dark, contrasting lighting of romantic and realist paintings, in favour of the pale tones of their peers' paintings such as those by Jean-Baptiste-Camille Corot and Boudin. After developing methods for painting transient effects, Monet would go on to seek more demanding subjects, new patrons and collectors; his paintings produced in the early 1870s left a lasting impact on the movement and his peers—many of whom moved to Argenteuil as a result of admiring his depiction.

In his later years, there is evidence that Monet had become skeptical of the term "Impressionist". In a 1906 letter to the artist Auguste-Michel Colle, sold at auction in 2022, Monet asks Colle to be patient regarding arrangements to visit his studio in Giverny, and closes with an admonition to avoid using the term:

"I have perfectly received your two letters but, being very busy, have been unable to reply sooner. The matter about which you ask me is quite serious and delicate. I surely do not want to refuse, and only pray you to tell me beforehand when you would like to come for, if I should be at work, it would impossible for me to receive you. I would therefore have to decide the day and time…P.S. You seem to singularly stick to this title of ‘impressionist’, which does not mean much and has made people tell so much nonsense."

Paintings 1858–1872

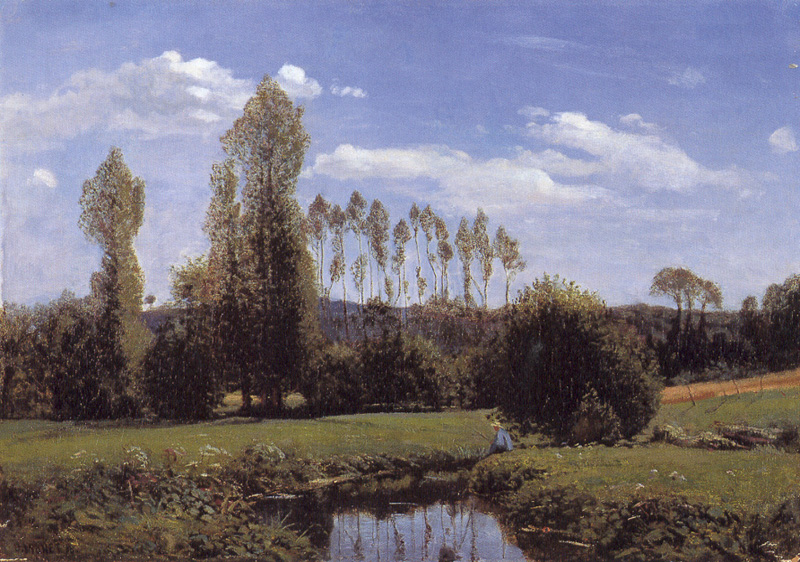
View at Rouelles, Le Havre 1858, private collection; an early work showing the influence of Corot and Courbet

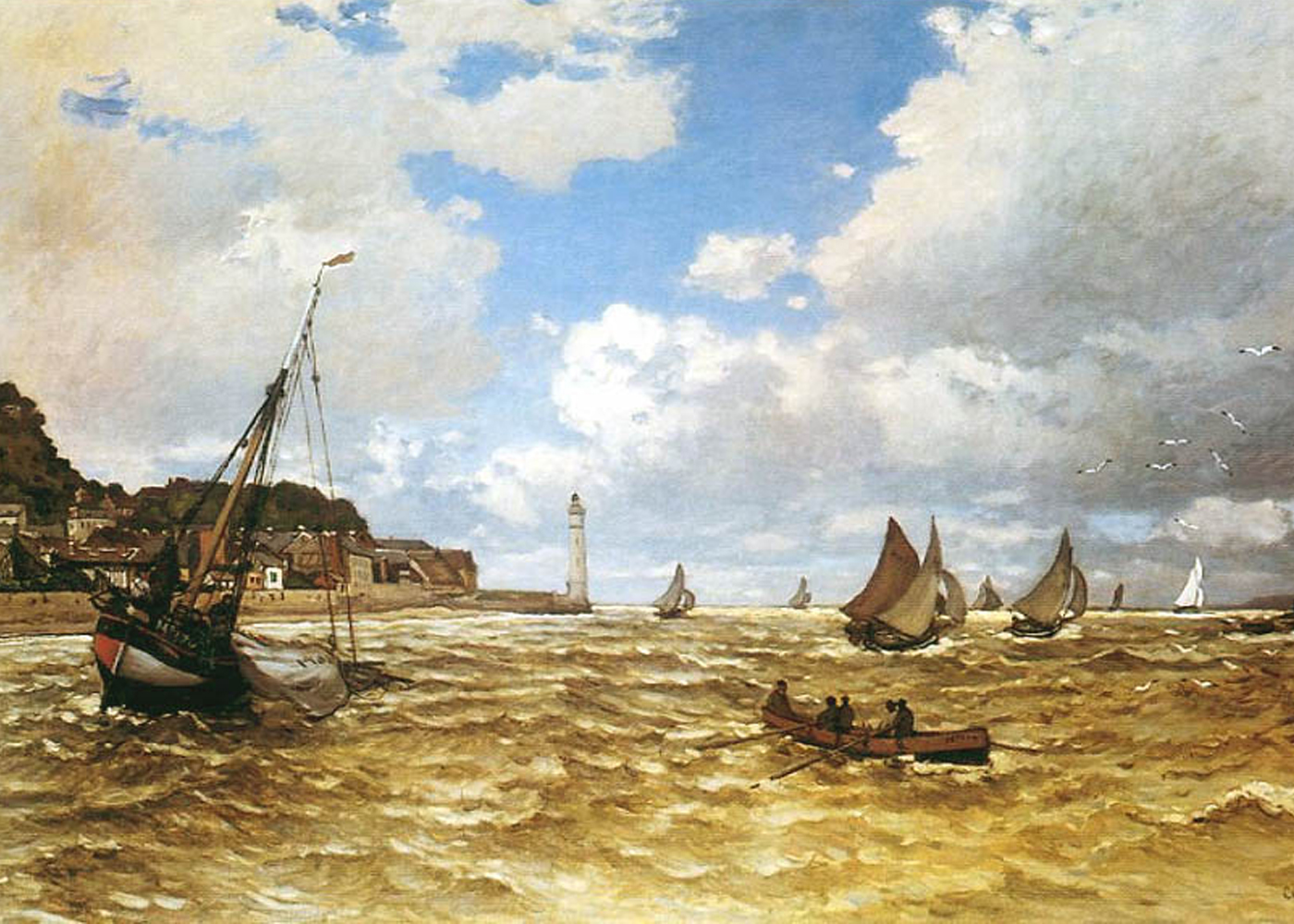
Mouth of the Seine at Honfleur, 1865, Norton Simon Foundation, Pasadena, California; indicates the influence of Dutch maritime painting.

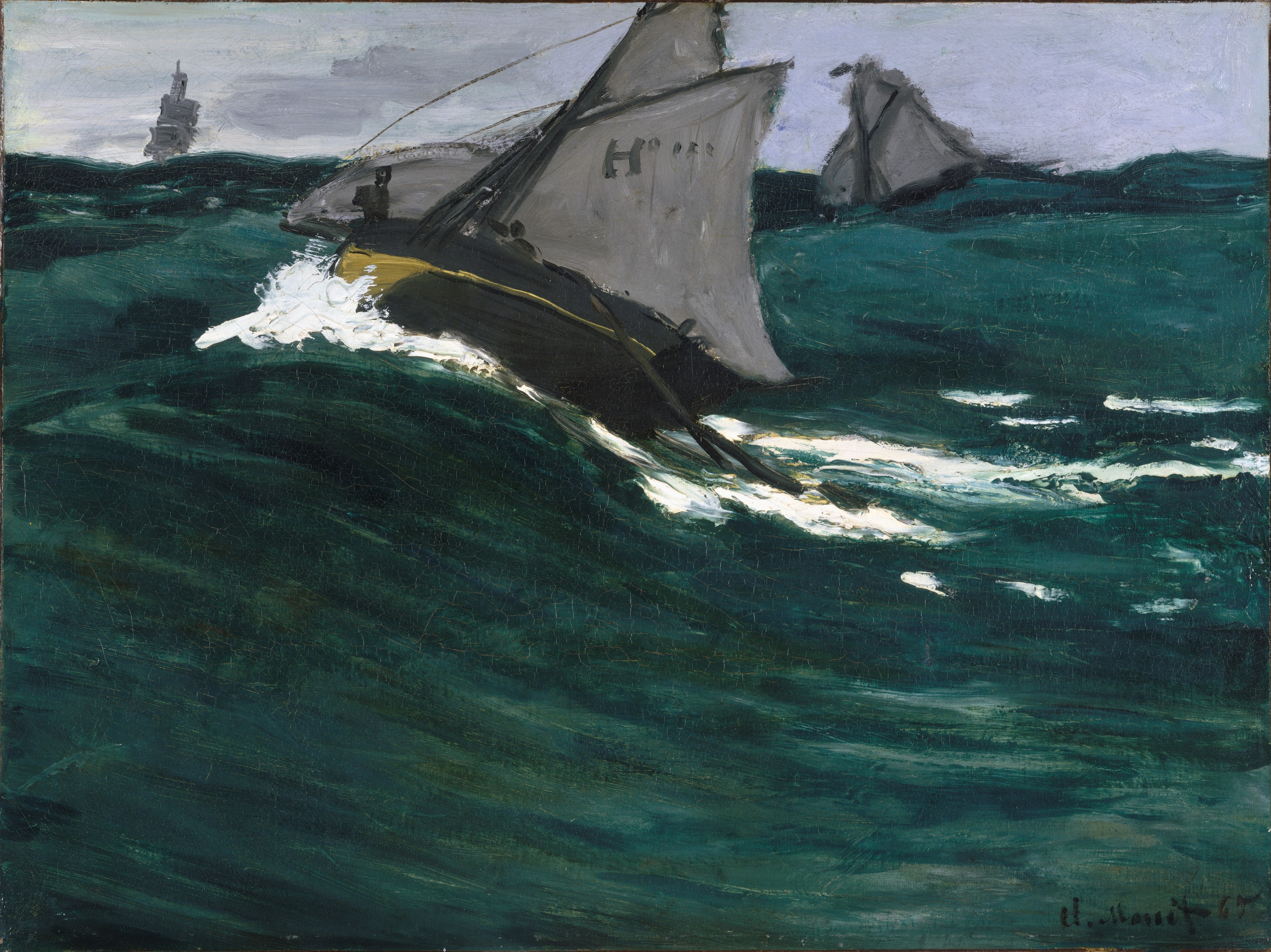
The Green Wave, 1866, Metropolitan Museum of Art

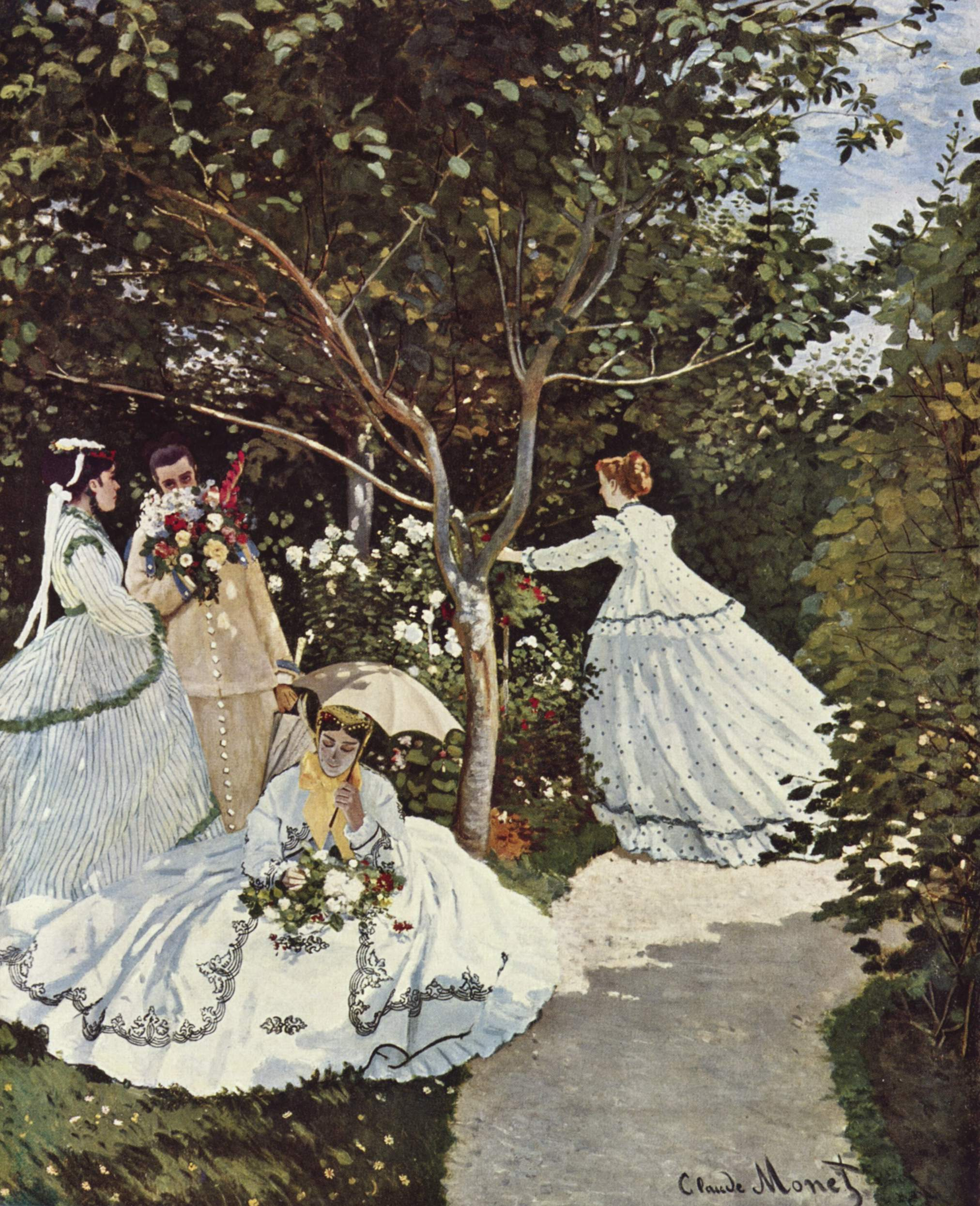
Women in the Garden, 1866–1867, Musée d'Orsay, Paris

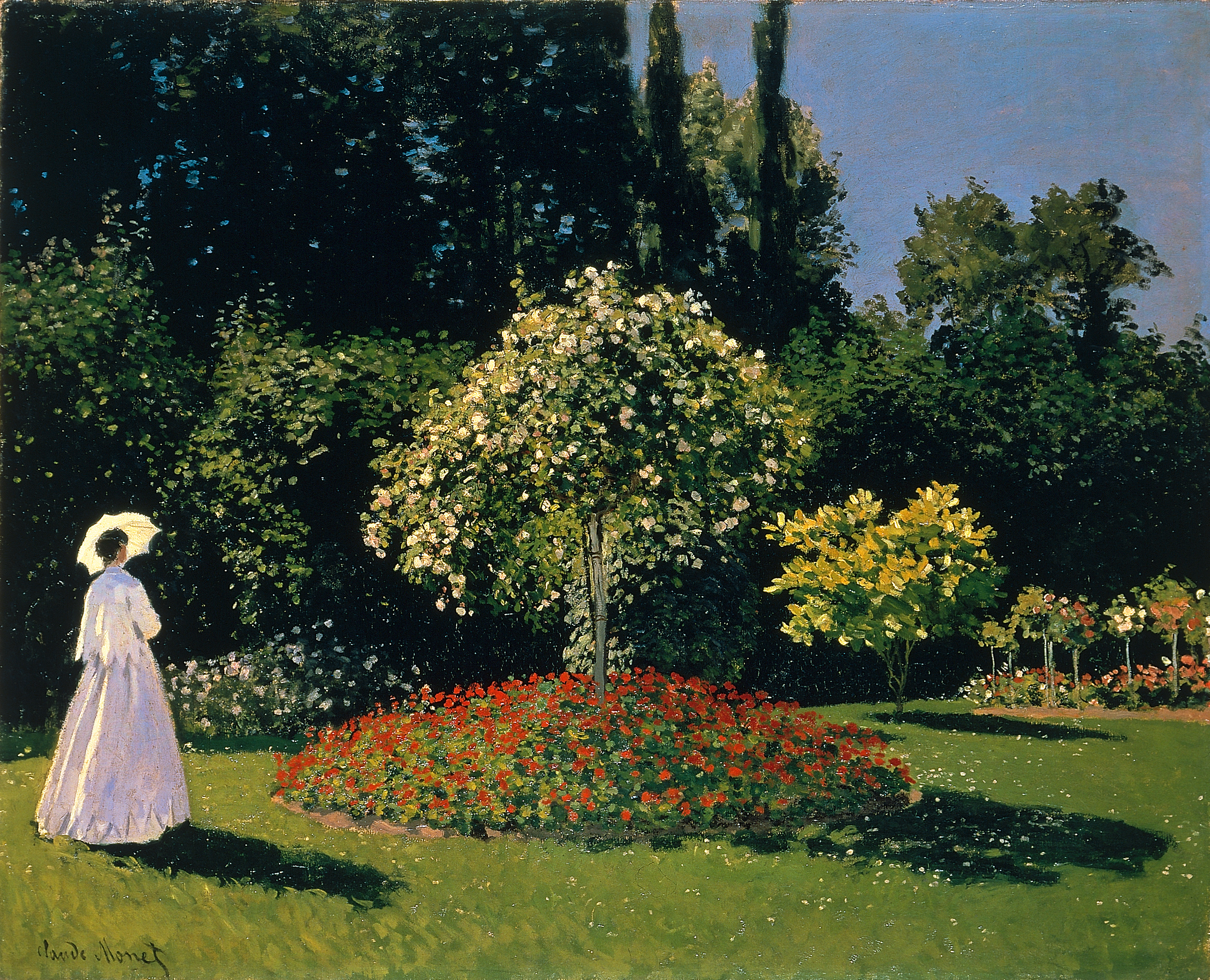
Woman in the Garden, 1867, Hermitage, St. Petersburg; a study in the effect of sunlight and shadow on colour.

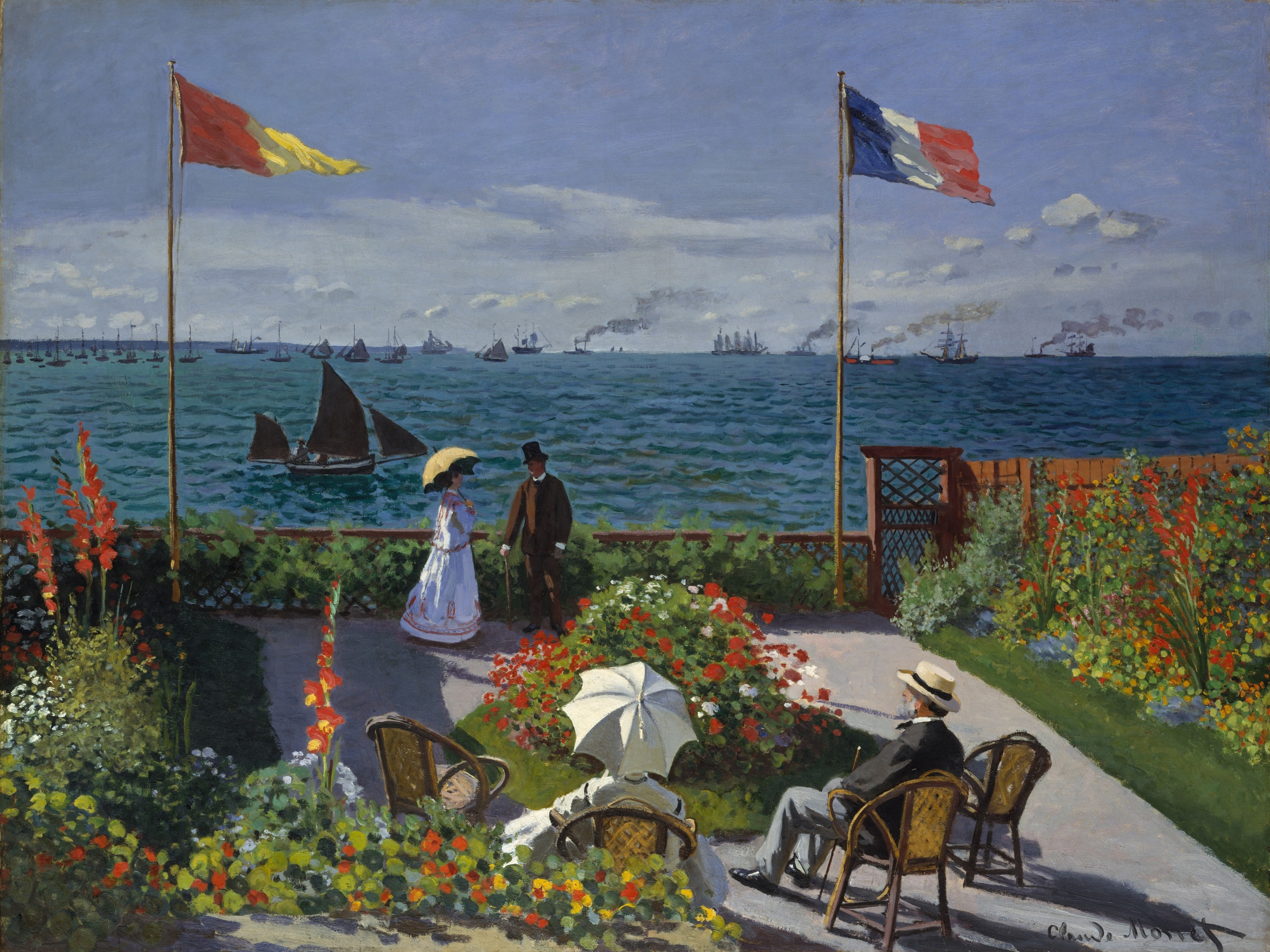
Garden at Sainte-Adresse ("Jardin à Sainte-Adresse"), 1867, Metropolitan Museum of Art, New York

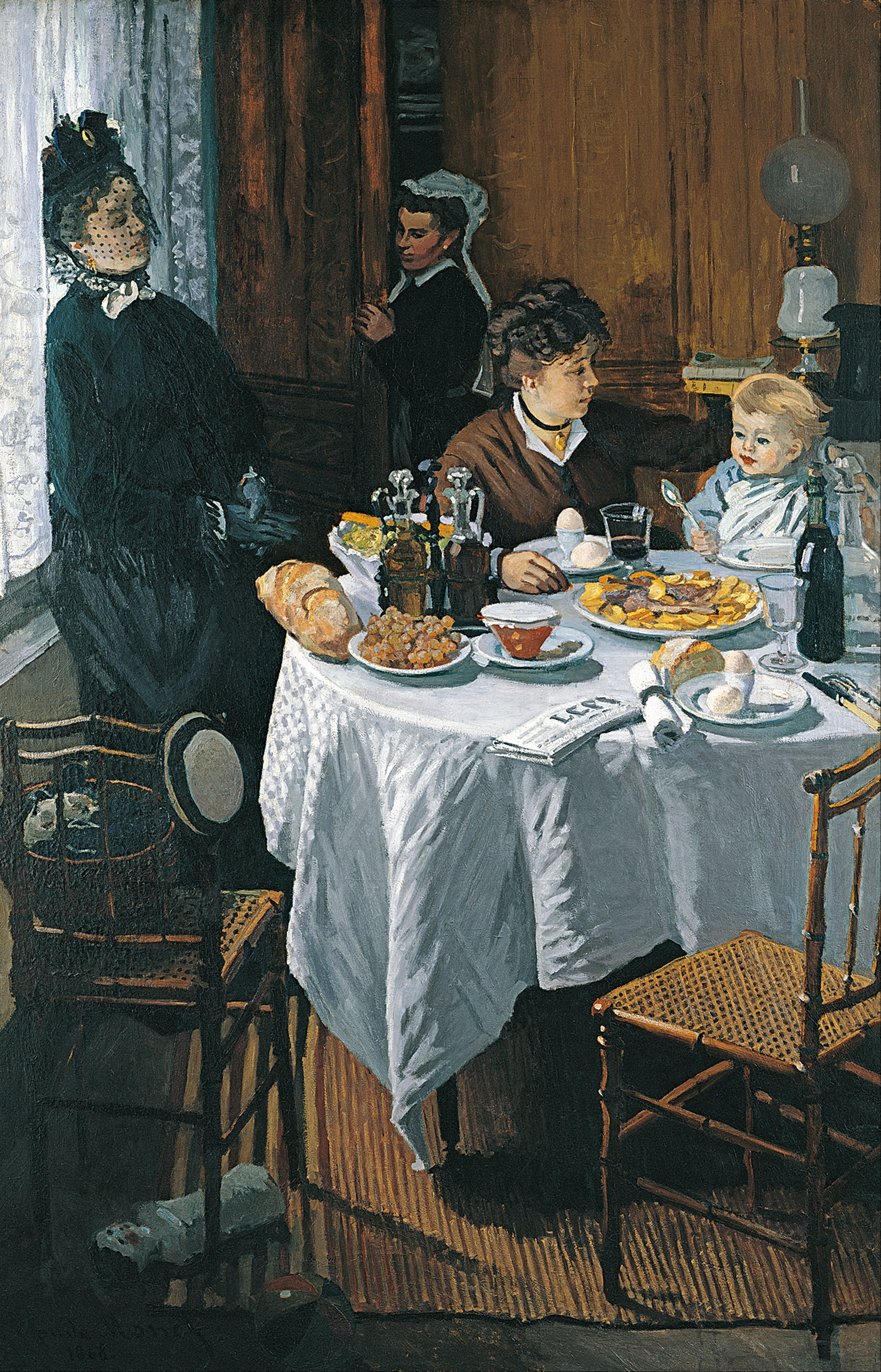
The Luncheon, 1868, Städel, which features Camille Doncieux and Jean Monet, was rejected by the Paris Salon of 1870 but included in the first Impressionists' exhibition in 1874.

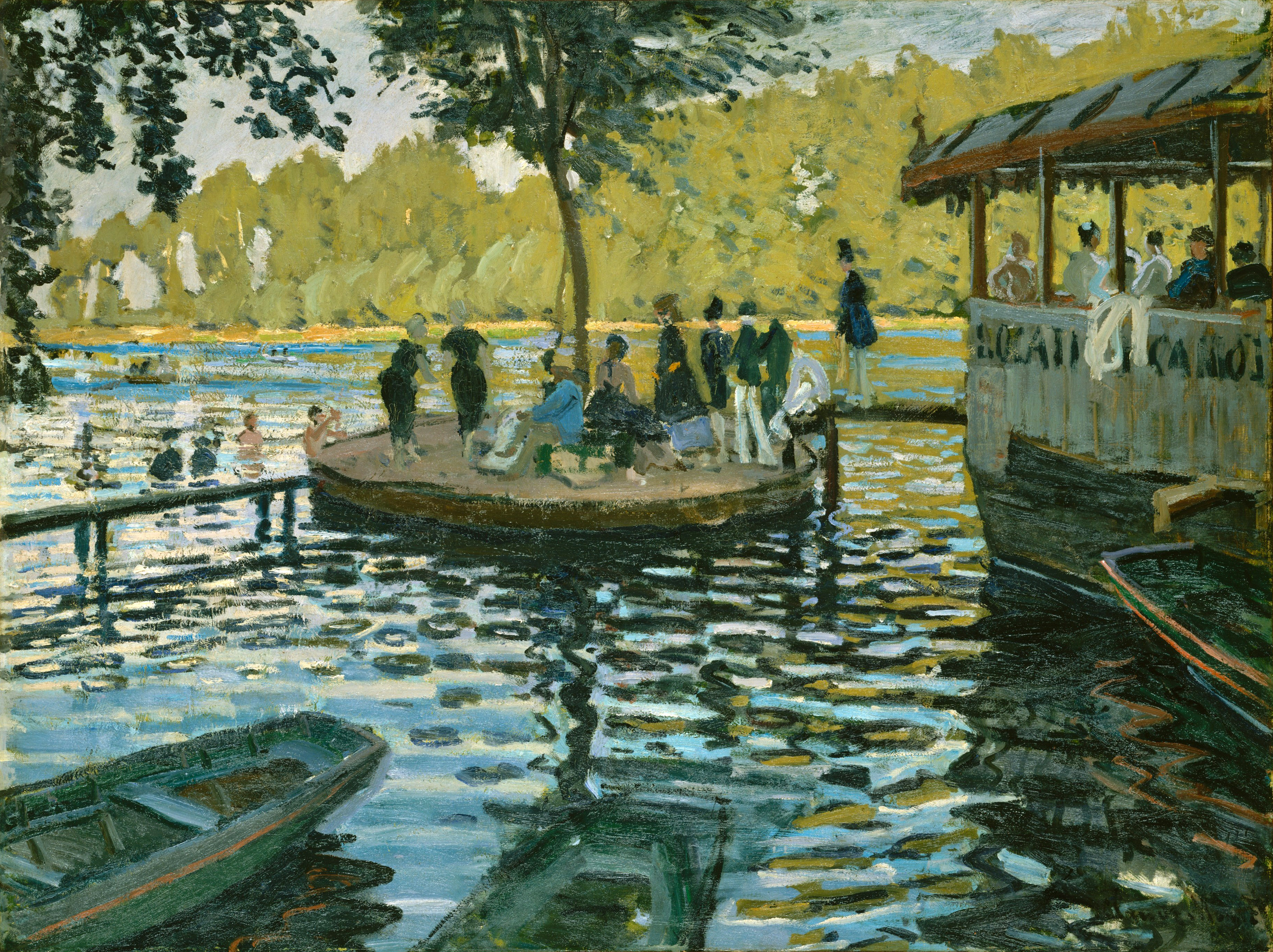
La Grenouillére 1869, Metropolitan Museum of Art, New York; a small plein-air painting created with broad strokes of intense colour.

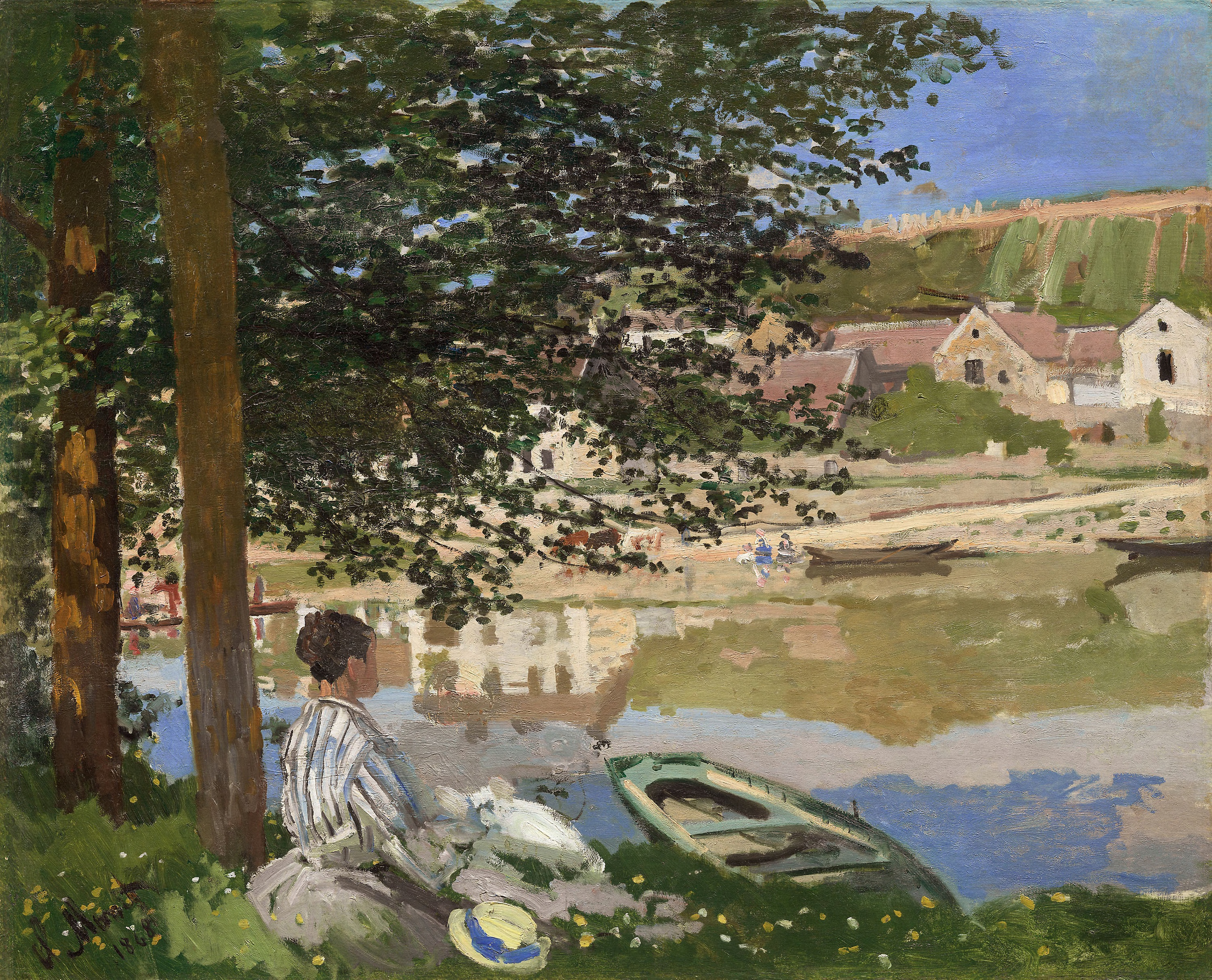
On the Bank of the Seine, Bennecourt, 1868, Art Institute of Chicago

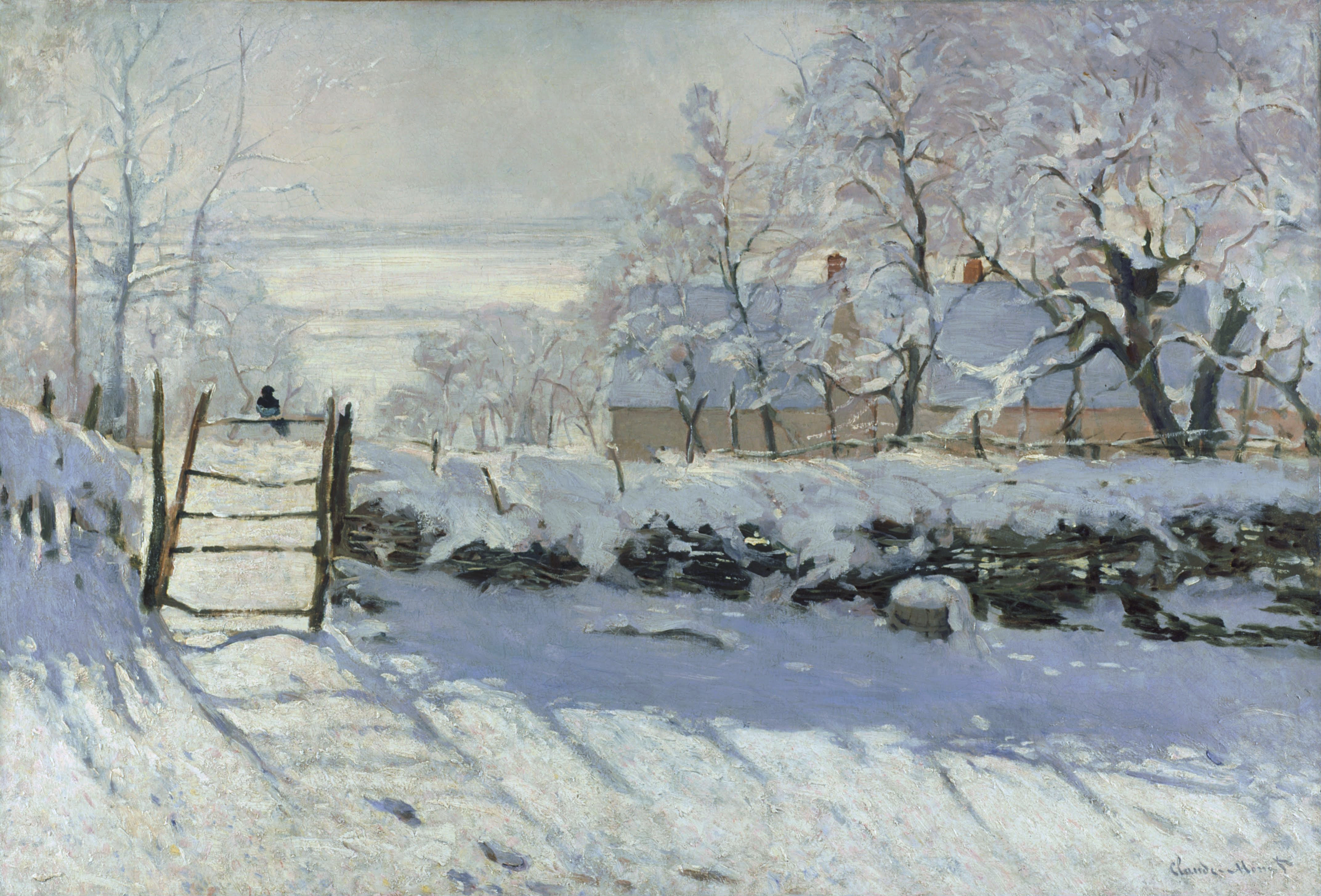
The Magpie, 1868–1869. Musée d'Orsay, Paris; one of Monet's early attempts at capturing the effect of snow on the landscape. See also Snow at Argenteuil

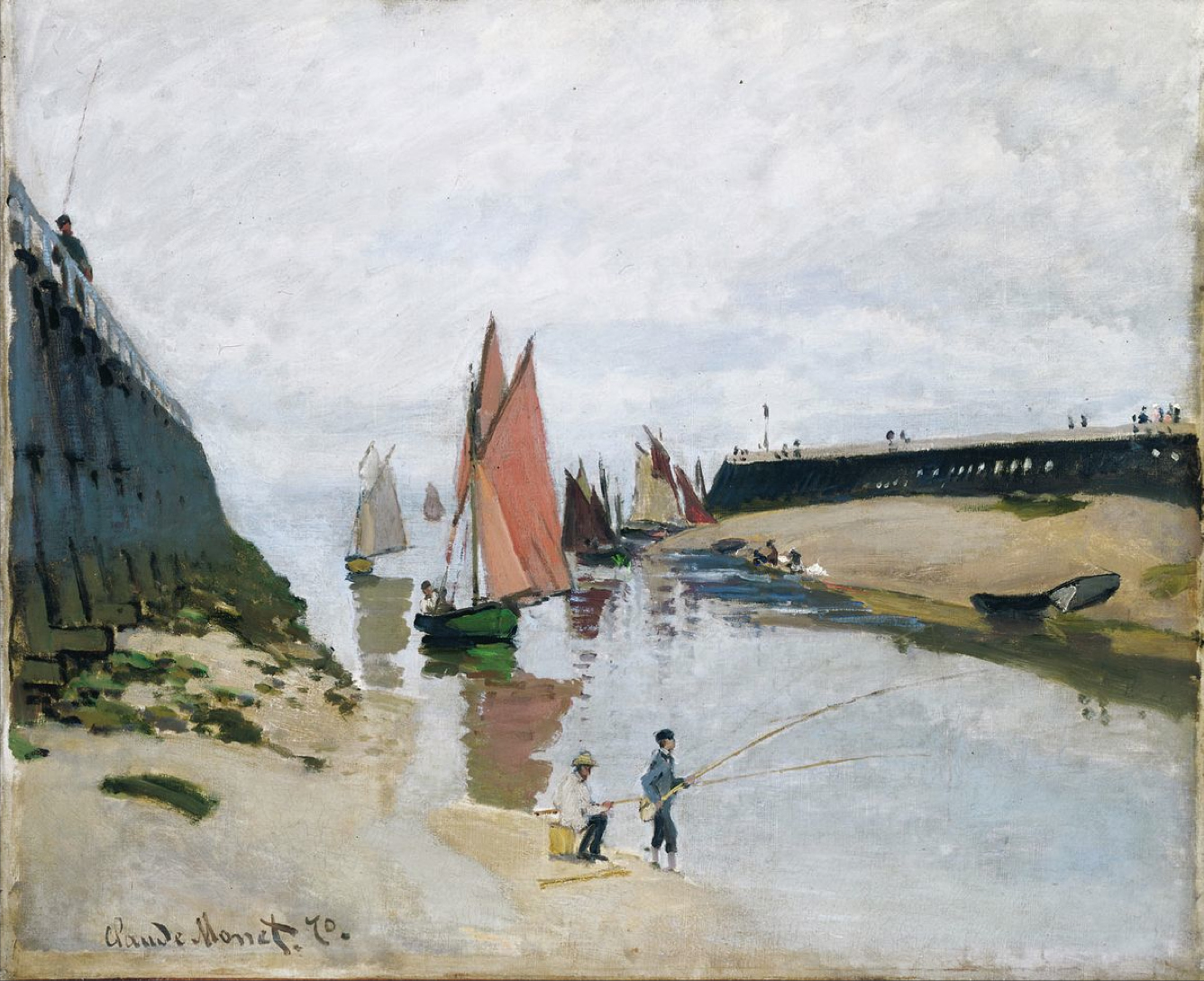
Le port de Trouville (Breakwater at Trouville, Low Tide), 1870, Museum of Fine Arts, Budapest

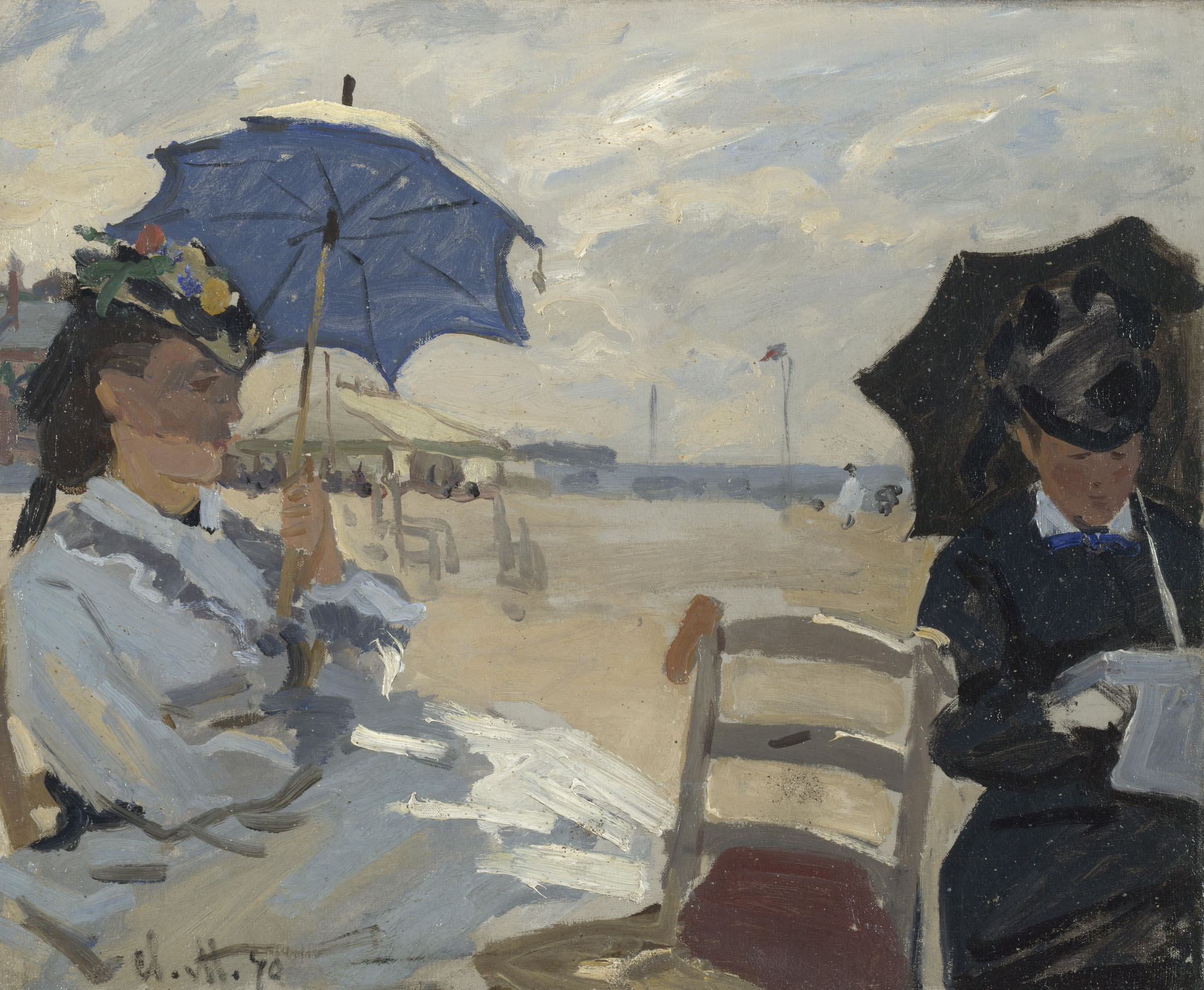
La plage de Trouville, 1870, National Gallery, London. The left figure may be Camille, on the right possibly the wife of Eugène Boudin, whose beach scenes influenced Monet.

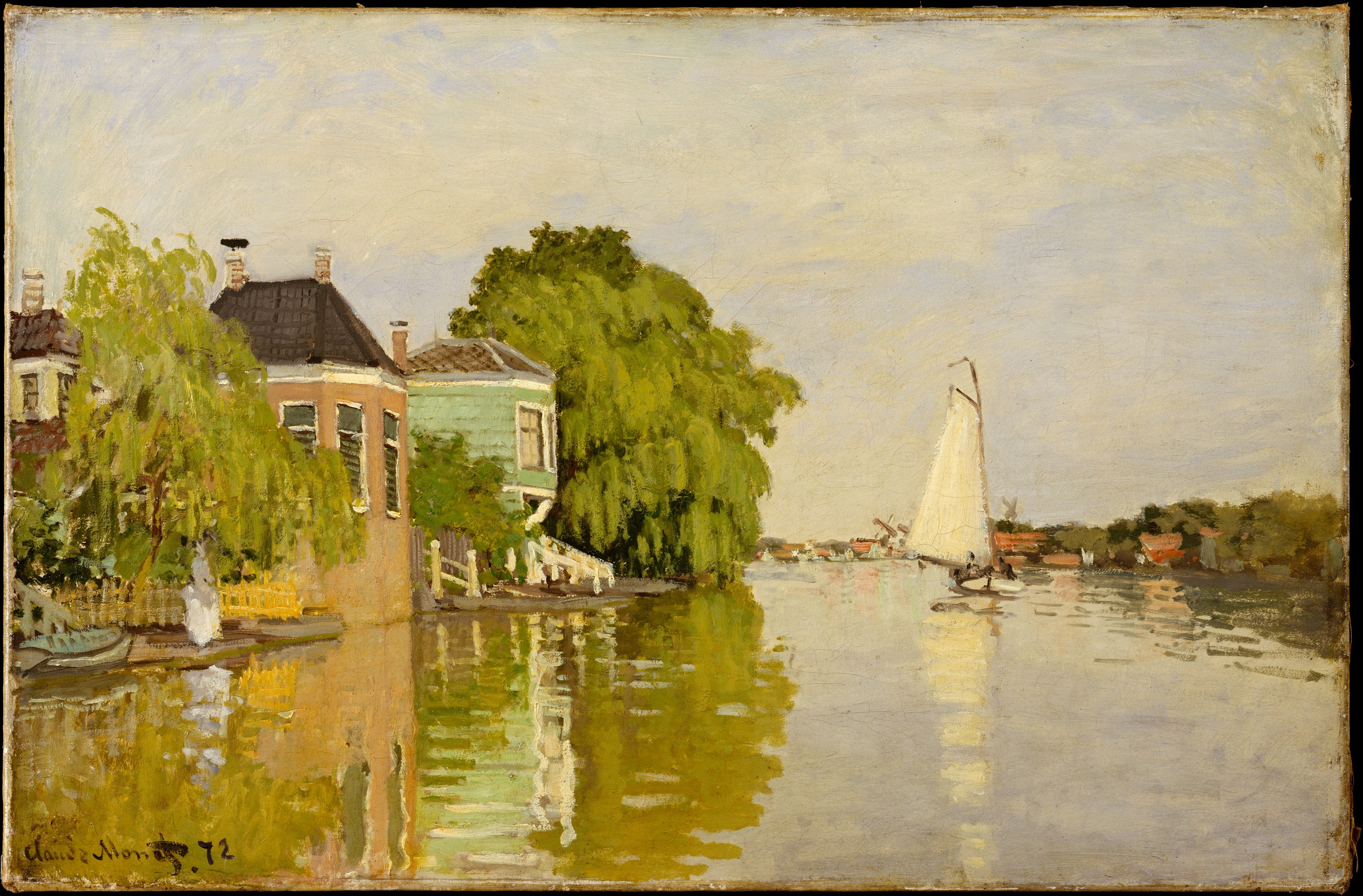
Houses on the Achterzaan, 1871, Metropolitan Museum of Art, New York

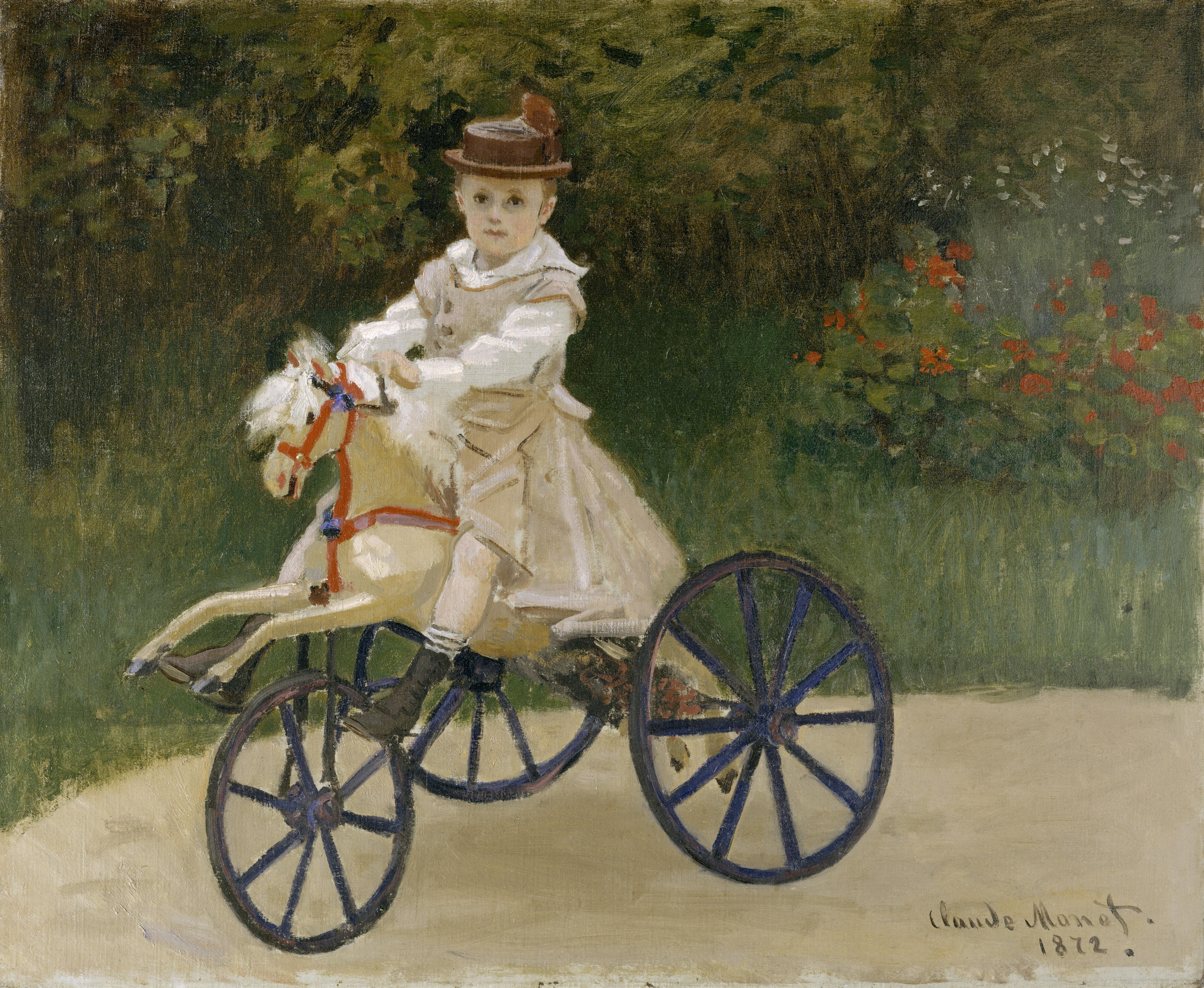
Jean Monet On His Hobby Horse, 1872. Metropolitan Museum of Art, New York

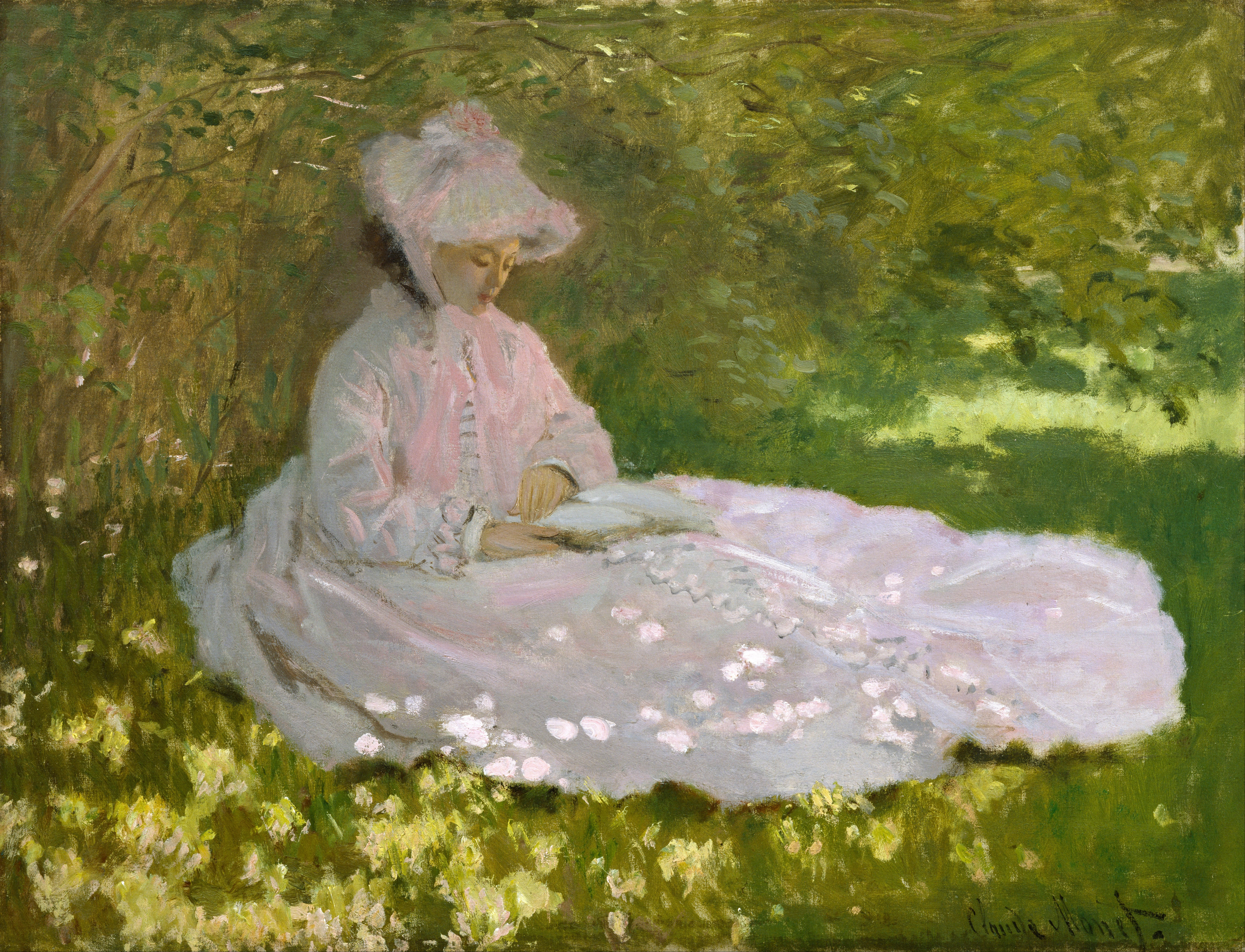
Springtime 1872, Walters Art Museum

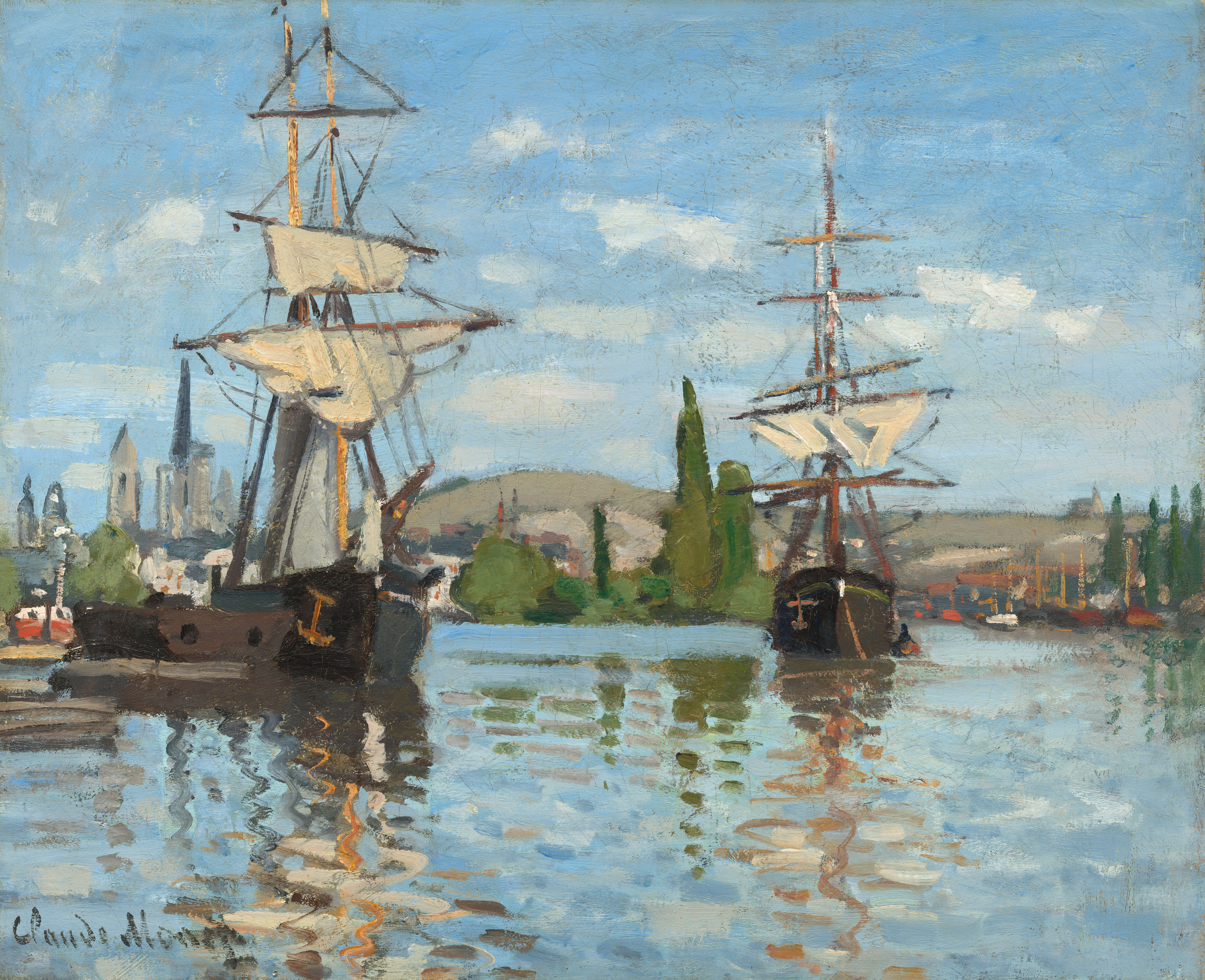
Ships Riding on the Seine at Rouen, 1872, National Gallery of Art, Washington DC

=== Death of Camille and Vétheuil ===
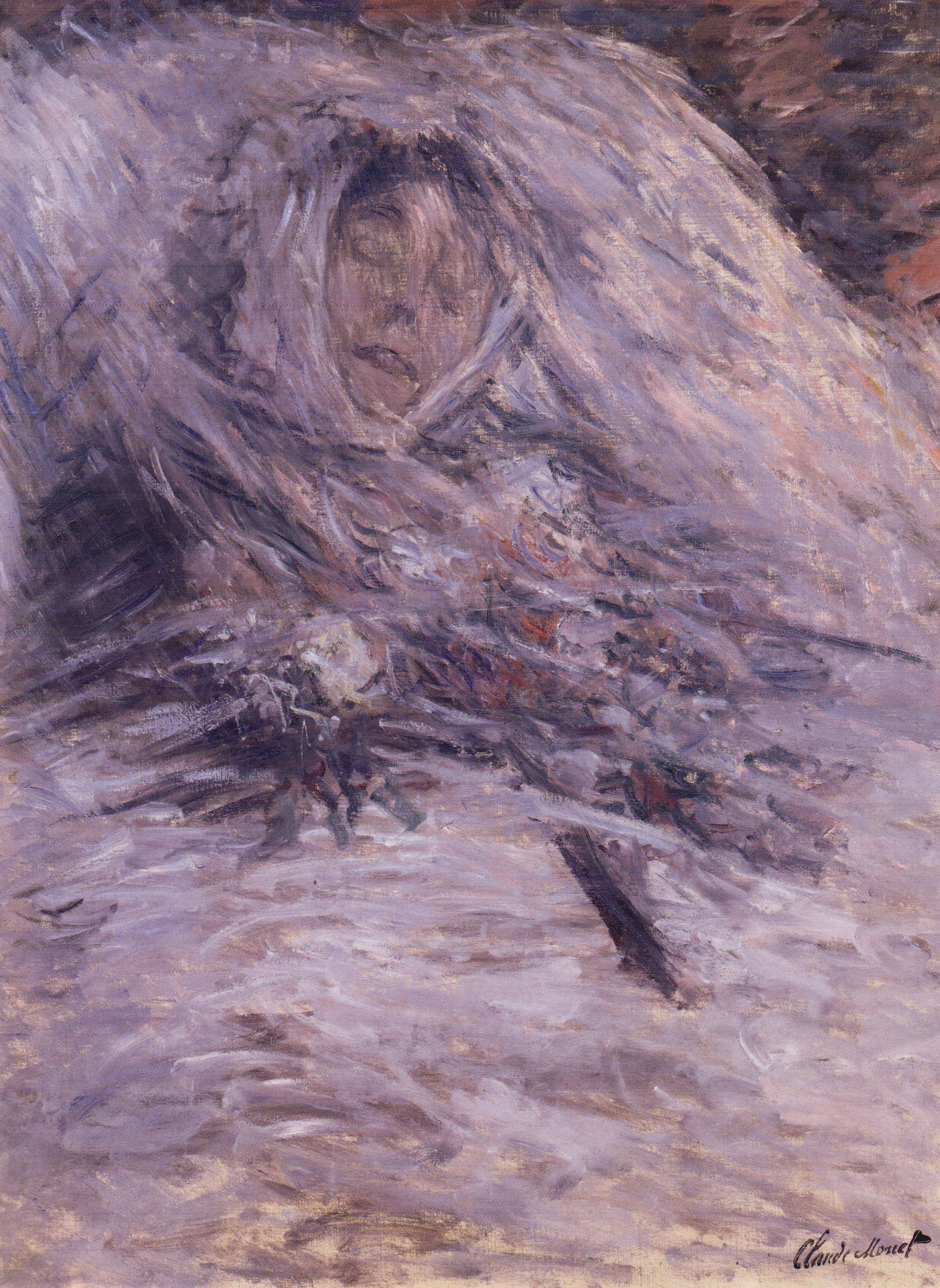
Claude Monet, Camille Monet On Her Deathbed, 1879, Musée d'Orsay, Paris

In 1875, Monet returned to figure painting with Woman with a Parasol - Madame Monet and Her Son, after effectively abandoning it with The Luncheon. His interest in the figure continued for the next four years—reaching its crest in 1877 and concluding altogether in 1890. In an "unusually revealing" letter to Théodore Duret, Monet discussed his revitalised interest: "I am working like never before on a new endeavour figures in plein air, as I understand them. This is an old dream, one that has always obsessed me and that I would like to master once and for all. But it is all so difficult! I am working very hard, almost to the point of making myself ill".

In 1876, Camille Monet became seriously ill. Their second son, Michel, was born in 1878, after which Camille's health deteriorated further. In the autumn of that year, they moved to the village of Vétheuil where they shared a house with the family of Ernest Hoschedé, a wealthy department store owner and patron of the arts who had commissioned four paintings from Monet. In 1878, Camille was diagnosed with uterine cancer. She died the next year. Her death, alongside financial difficulties—once having to leave his house to avoid creditors—afflicted Monet's career; Hoschedé had recently purchased several paintings but soon went bankrupt, leaving for Paris in hopes of regaining his fortune, as interest in the Impressionists dwindled.

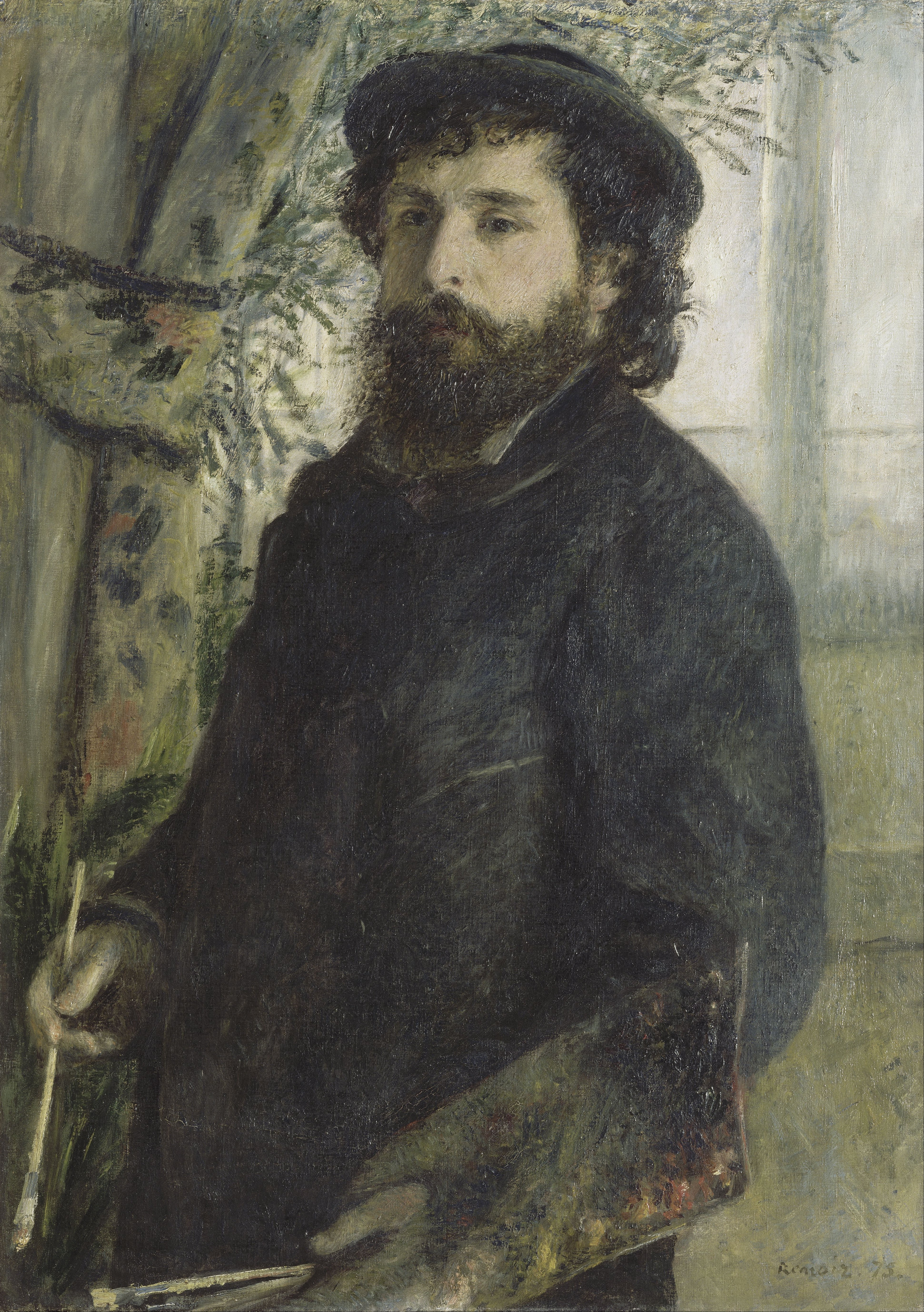
Pierre-Auguste Renoir, Portrait of the Painter Claude Monet, 1875, Musée d'Orsay

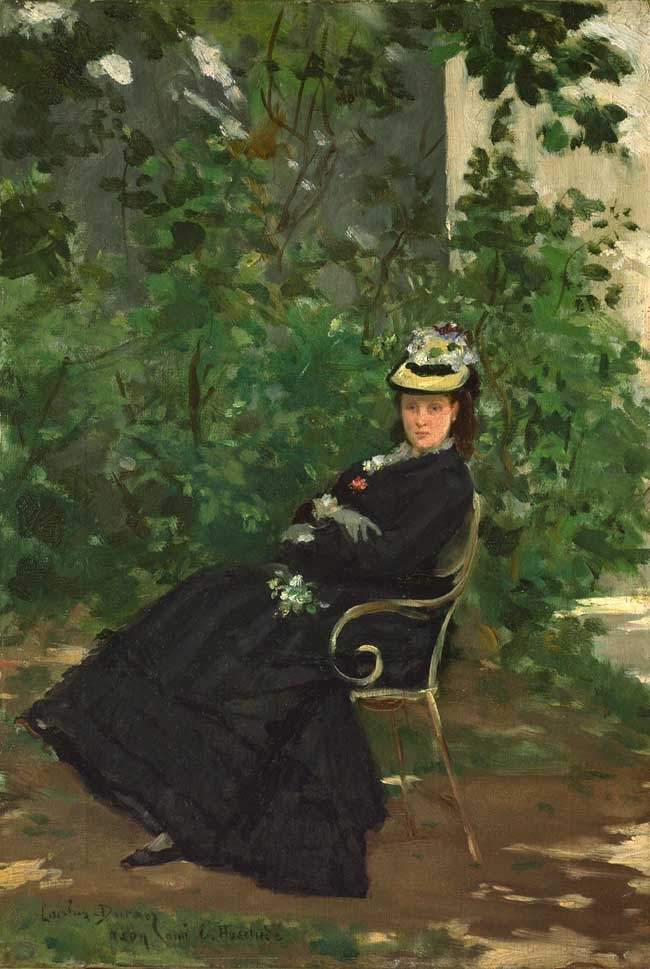
Carolus-Duran, Alice Hoschedé, second wife of Claude Monet and mother of Blanche Hoschedé Monet, 1878

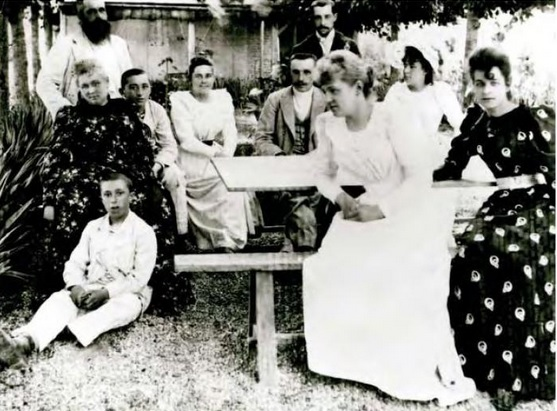
The Monet and Hoschedé families c. 1880 from left to right: Claude Monet, Alice Hoschedé, Jean-Pierre Hoschedé, Jacques Hoschedé, Blanche Hoschedé Monet, Jean Monet, Michel Monet, Martha Hoschedé, Germaine Hoschedé, Suzanne Hoschedé

Monet made a study in oils of his dead wife. Many years later, he confessed to his friend Georges Clemenceau that his need to analyse colours was both a joy and a torment to him. He explained: "I one day found myself looking at my beloved wife's dead face and just systematically noting the colours according to an automatic reflex". John Berger describes the work as "a blizzard of white, grey, purplish paint ... a terrible blizzard of loss which will forever efface her features. In fact there can be very few death-bed paintings which have been so intensely felt or subjectively expressive."

Monet's study of the Seine continued. He submitted two paintings to the Salon in 1880, one of which was accepted. He began to abandon Impressionist techniques as his paintings utilised darker tones and displayed environments, such as the Seine River, in harsh weather. For the rest of the decade, he focused on the elemental aspect of nature. The major event of the winter of 1881 was without any doubt that he again sold his paintings to Durand-Ruel. Because of Monet's continual difficulty in paying his rent, the landlady at Vétheuil refused to extend his tenancy, and in December 1881 Monet moved with Alice and her children to Poissy. In addition to the debts he had accumulated, there was also the problem of finding a suitable school for his son Jean. The stay in Poissy would not last very long. In December 1882 the Seine had overflowed its banks and there was a danger of flooding the Monet residence.

His personal life influenced his distancing from the Impressionists. In January 1883 he returned to Étretat and expressed in letters to Alice Hoschedé—who he would marry in 1892, following her husband's death the preceding year—a desire to die. At this time Monet was afraid of losing Alice to her husband, who was suddenly speaking of taking her back. On 21 February, Monet and Alice Hoschedé finally met again at Poissy, and there was no more doubt that she would now stay by his side. Alice's third daughter, Suzanne, would become Monet's "preferred model", after Camille.

In April 1883 Monet informed Durand-Ruel that he was searching for a house around Vernon, a city he had frequently passed through while travelling between Paris and Normandy. On 29 April he moved into a rented house in Giverny near Vernon with some of his children, followed by Alice Hoschedé the day after. This house subsequently became the permanent home of the Monet family. That same year his first major retrospective show was held.

=== Bordighera and a turn to prosperity ===
In December 1883 Claude Monet and Auguste Renoir left Paris by train for a short painting trip to Italy, along the Italian Riviera and to Genoa.

On the way back, Monet and Renoir stopped briefly at l´Estaque, near Marseille, to visit Cézanne, before returning to Giverny late December. During this trip Monet discovered the small town of Bordighera which he found particularly attractive: in a letter to Durand-Ruel on 12 January 1884, he described it as "one of the most beautiful places we saw on our trip".

In the years leading up to 1883, Bordighera, with its mild climate and stunning coastal views, had become widely popular as a winter destination for tourists, particularly among the European elite as well as artists and intellectuals. One of the town's main attractions were the Moreno Gardens which, in tourist guidebooks of that time, were described not only as one of the most attractive and delightful locations of the Mediterranean, but also as some of the most beautiful and renowned gardens in Europe. Earlier in 1883 the famous architect Charles Garnier wrote a piece in a travel book called Artistic features of Bordighera. In the first chapter, he claims that "in truth, Bordighera is far less Italy than Palestine…" referring to the old town, the free growing palm trees and the exotic gardens. In his text Garnier recommends eight point of views which he finds most interesting for any artist to paint.

Soon after his return to Giverny, Monet wrote to his art dealer Paul Durand-Ruel expressing his desire to go back to Italy and Bordighera for a longer stay. He put forward his desire to go on his own and asked Durand-Ruel not to mention his wish to anyone, especially not to Renoir. Monet initially intended to spend three weeks in the Ligurian town but ended up staying for a period of almost three months, from 18 January to 5 April, during which he produced thirty-eight paintings with Bordighera motifs. Monet was deeply affected by the beauty of Bordighera and its surroundings, which he described as magic — a fairy tale country. The unique light and luxuriant vegetation presented themselves as a completely new challenge. In a letter to Alice Horschedé, he wrote "These palm trees are exasperating, and also the motifs are extremely difficult to render, to put down on canvas, everything is so lush".

During his sojourn in Bordighera Monet had initially intended to paint "orange and lemon trees against the blue sea" but he could not find any that really pleased him therefore he only produced one painting with a citrus tree motif, Under the Lemon Trees. During his stay in Bordighera, Monet went to nearby Dolceaqua where he painted the bridge which he called "a little gem of elegance".

Some of the most notable compositions from his stay in Bordighera are View of Bordighera, Olive Trees, Villas at Bordighera, The Moreno Garden, Valley of Sasso and Dolceacqua.

The Bordighera paintings are not so well known to the public as some of his work. One explanation presented is that following the Paris Stock market crash of 1882 Monet's art dealer Durand-Ruels suffered a severe financial loss and consequently, he had to pawn several of Monet's Bordighera paintings as soon as he had received them. Monet, who had been eager to hear what critics would say about his latest work, was devastated when he found out that they would never be exhibited. Eventually, after Durand-Ruel left for the United States in 1886, Monet could only express his utter frustration by writing letters where he accused the dealer of being "only concerned with the United States while we (the Impressionists) are being forgotten in France".

Finally leaving Bordighera, Monet stopped in Menton to paint the Cap Martin and Monte Carlo before embarking on the 24 hour trip back to Giverny.

In a letter sent to Monet in 1884, Paul Durand-Ruel mentions Monet's financial worries, and tells him that both the stockbroker Theodore-Charles Gadala and Georges Clemenceau have purchased paintings. Monet's struggles with creditors ended following his prosperous trips; to Bordighera in 1884, and to the Netherlands in 1886 to paint the tulips. He soon met and became friends with Gustave Geffroy, who published an article on Monet. Despite his qualms, Monet's paintings were sold in America and contributed towards his financial security. In contrast to the last two decades of his career, Monet favoured working alone—and felt that he was always better when he did, having regularly "long[ed] for solitude, away from crowded tourist resorts and sophisticated urban settings". Such a desire was recurrent in his letters to Alice.

Paintings 1873–1886

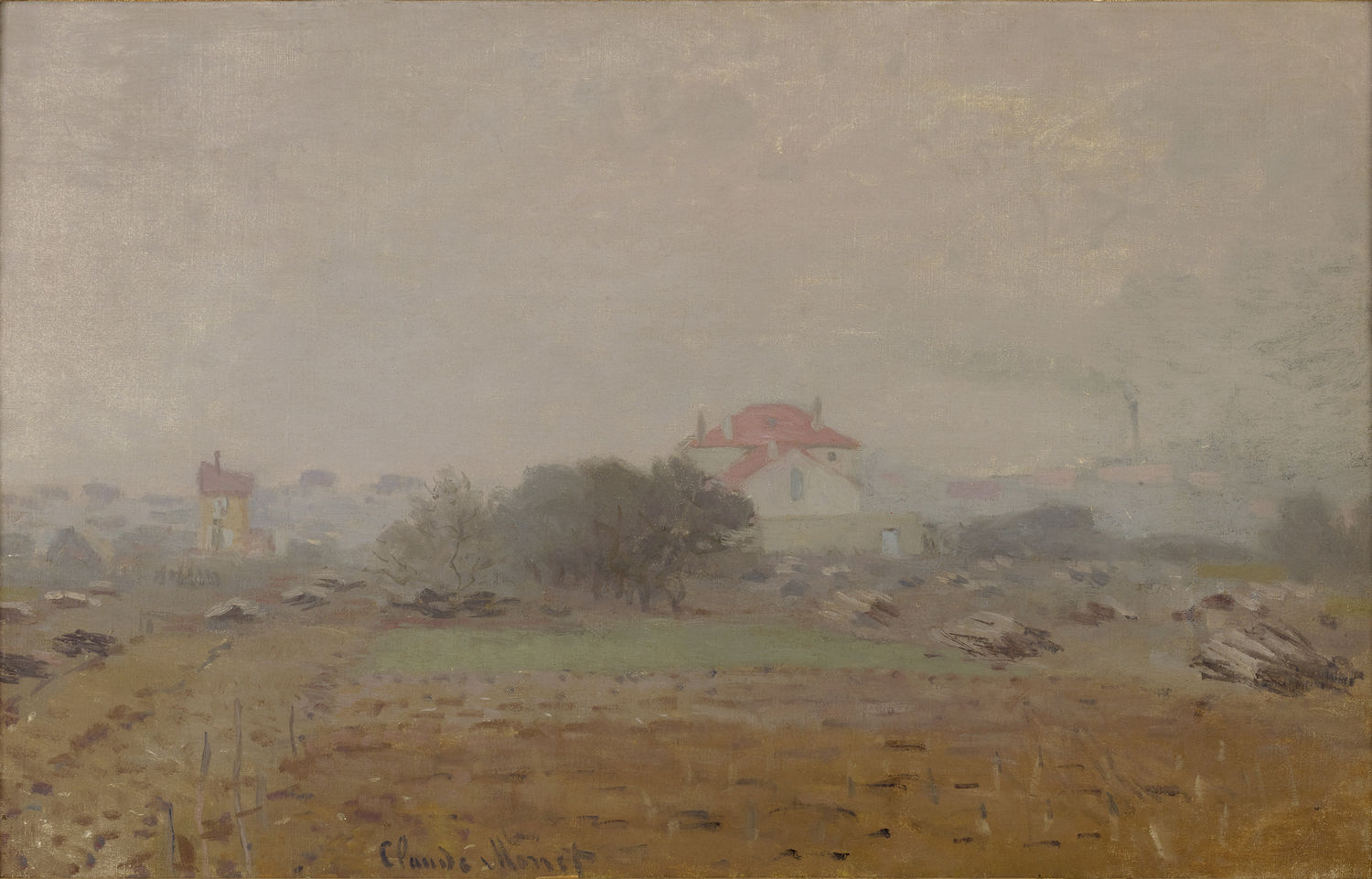
Effet de Brouillard, c. 1872

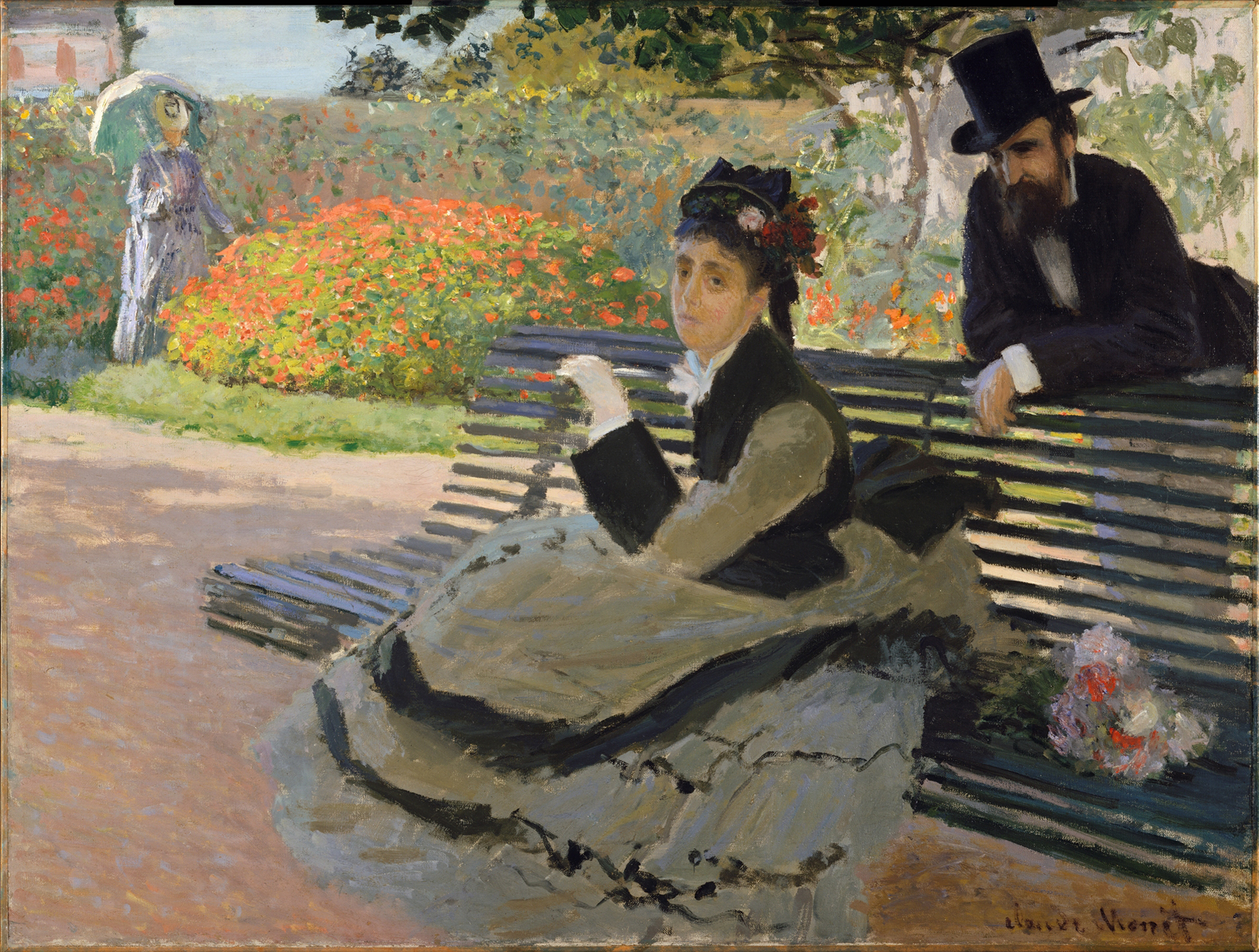
Camille Monet on a Garden Bench, 1873, Metropolitan Museum of Art, New York

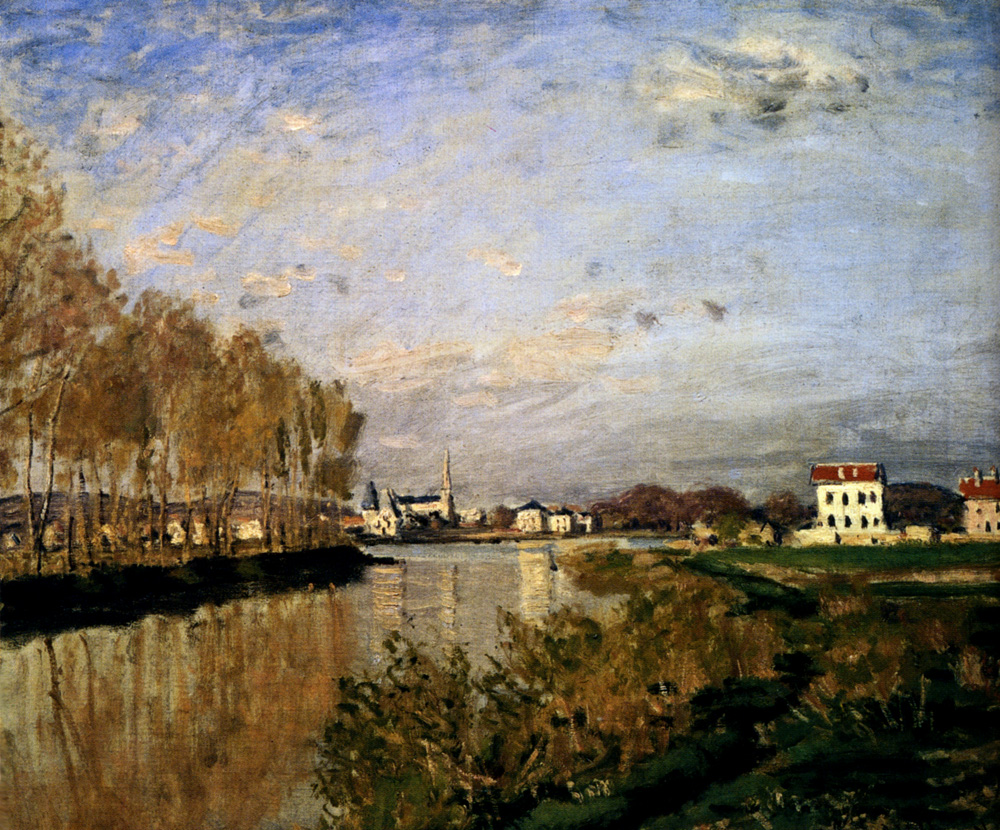
The Seine at Argenteuil, 1873

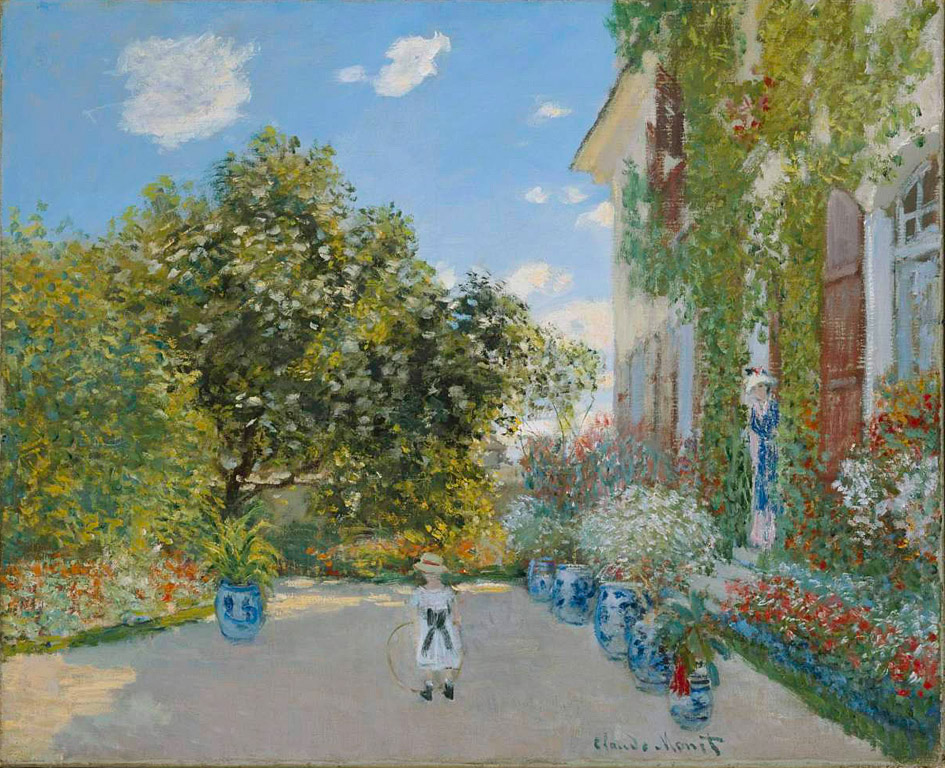
The Artist's House at Argenteuil, 1873, Art Institute of Chicago

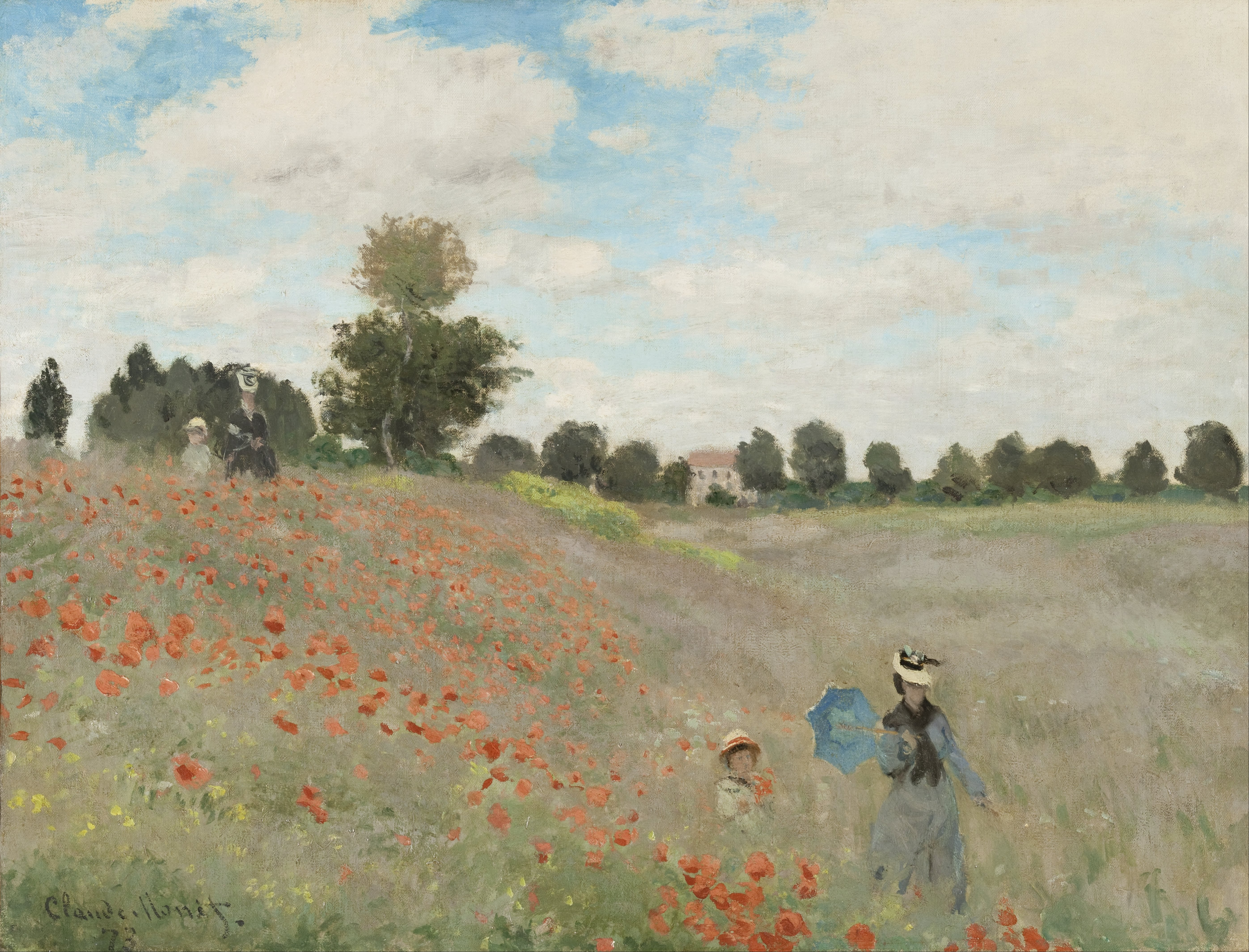
Coquelicots, La promenade (Poppies), 1873, Musée d'Orsay, Paris

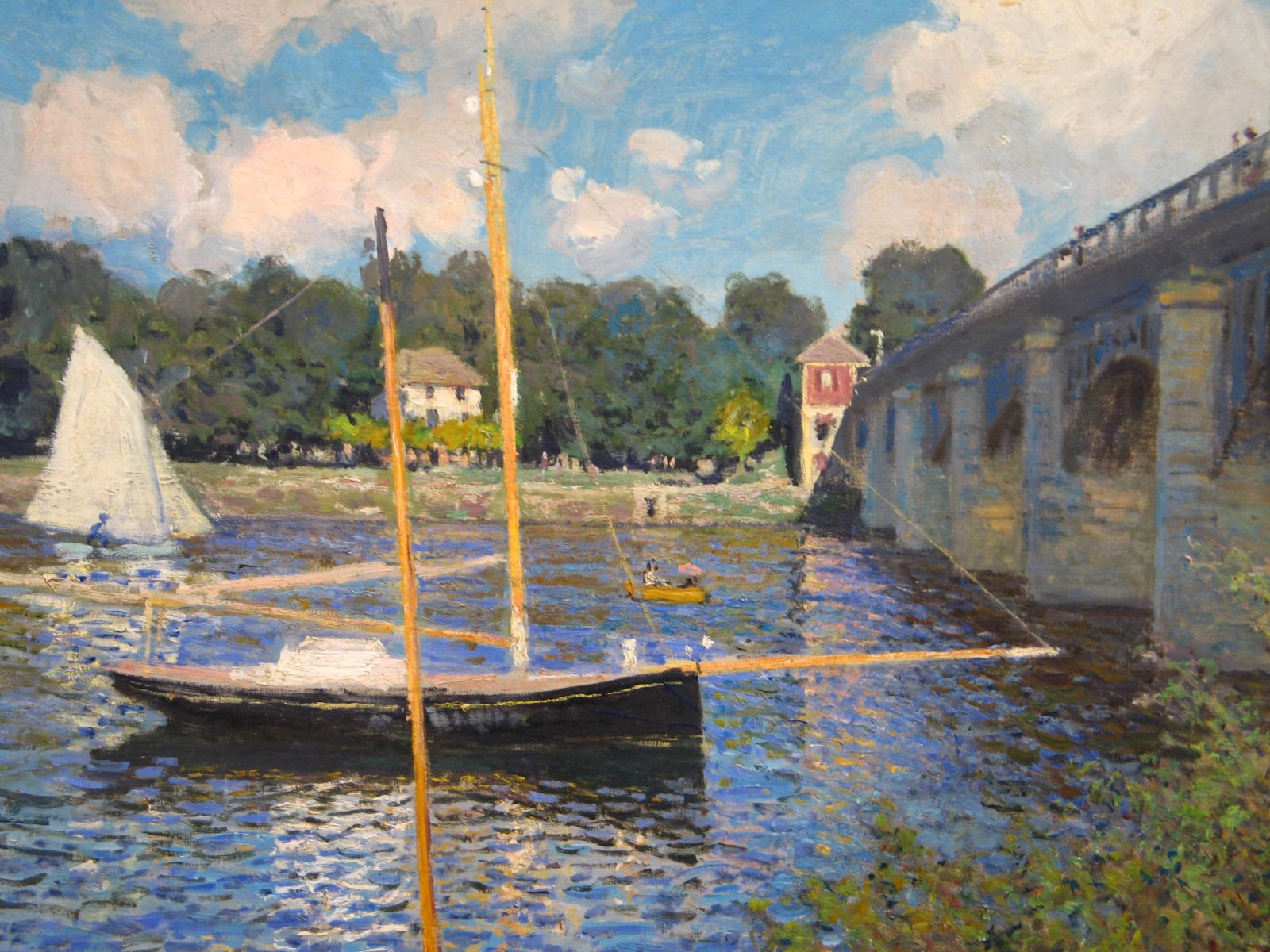
Argenteuil, 1874, National Gallery of Art, Washington DC

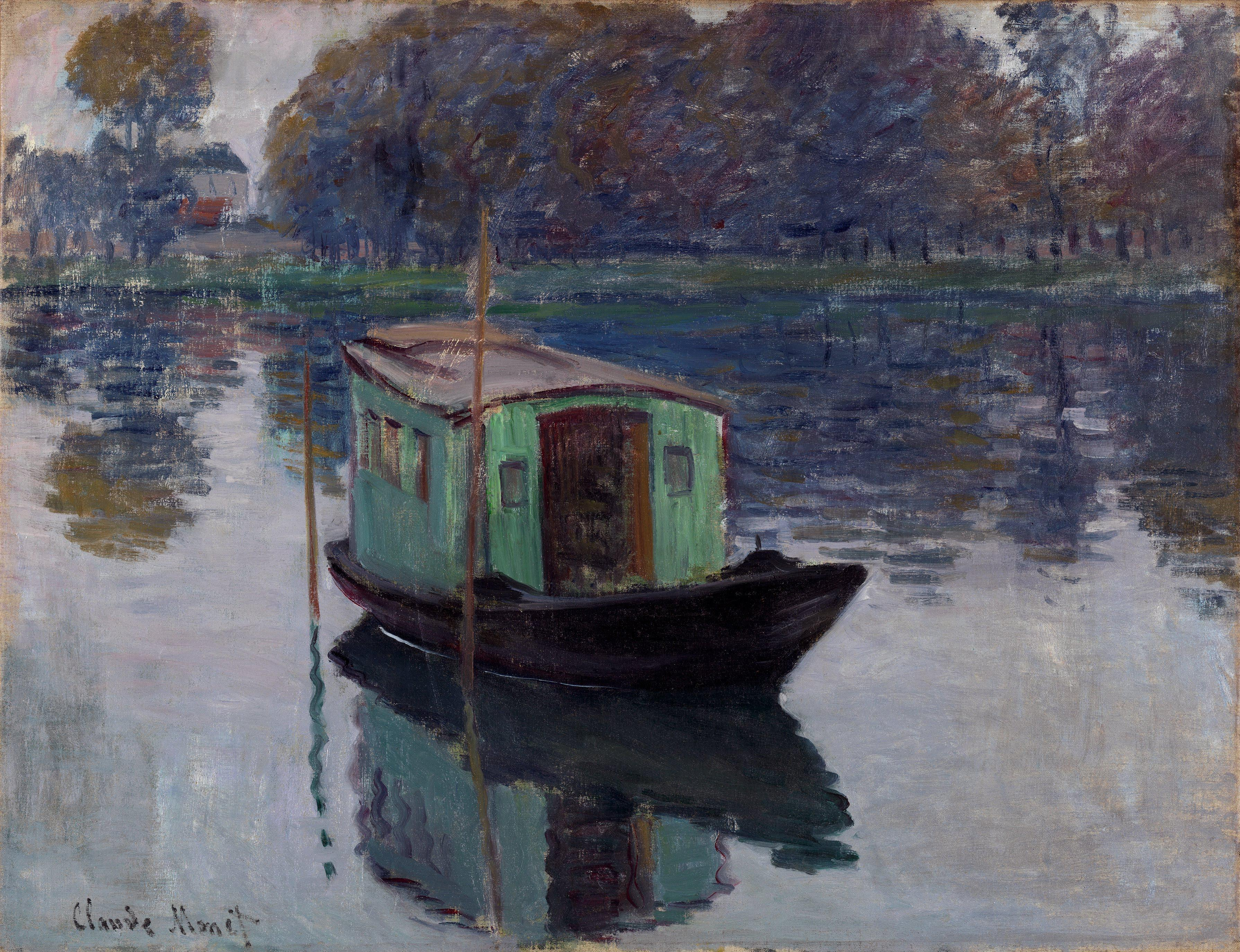
The Studio Boat, 1874, Kröller-Müller Museum, Otterlo, Netherlands

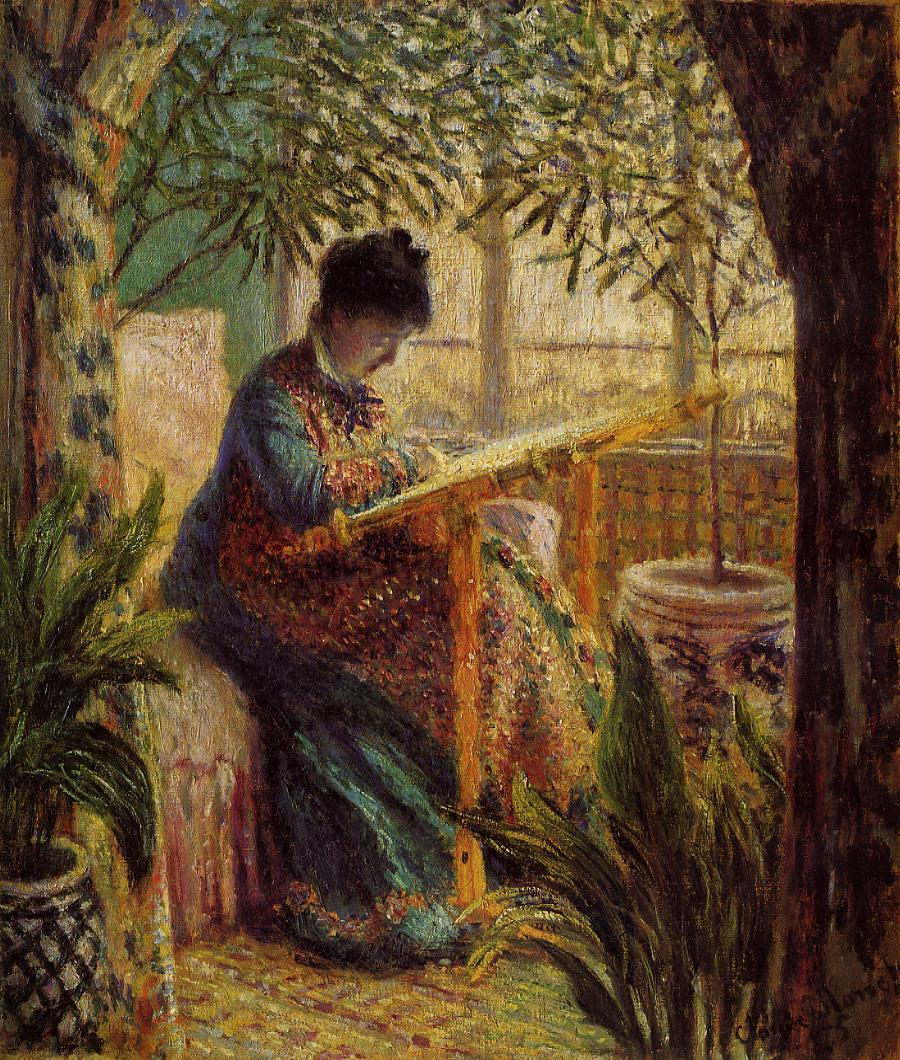
Camille au métier, 1875, Barnes collection

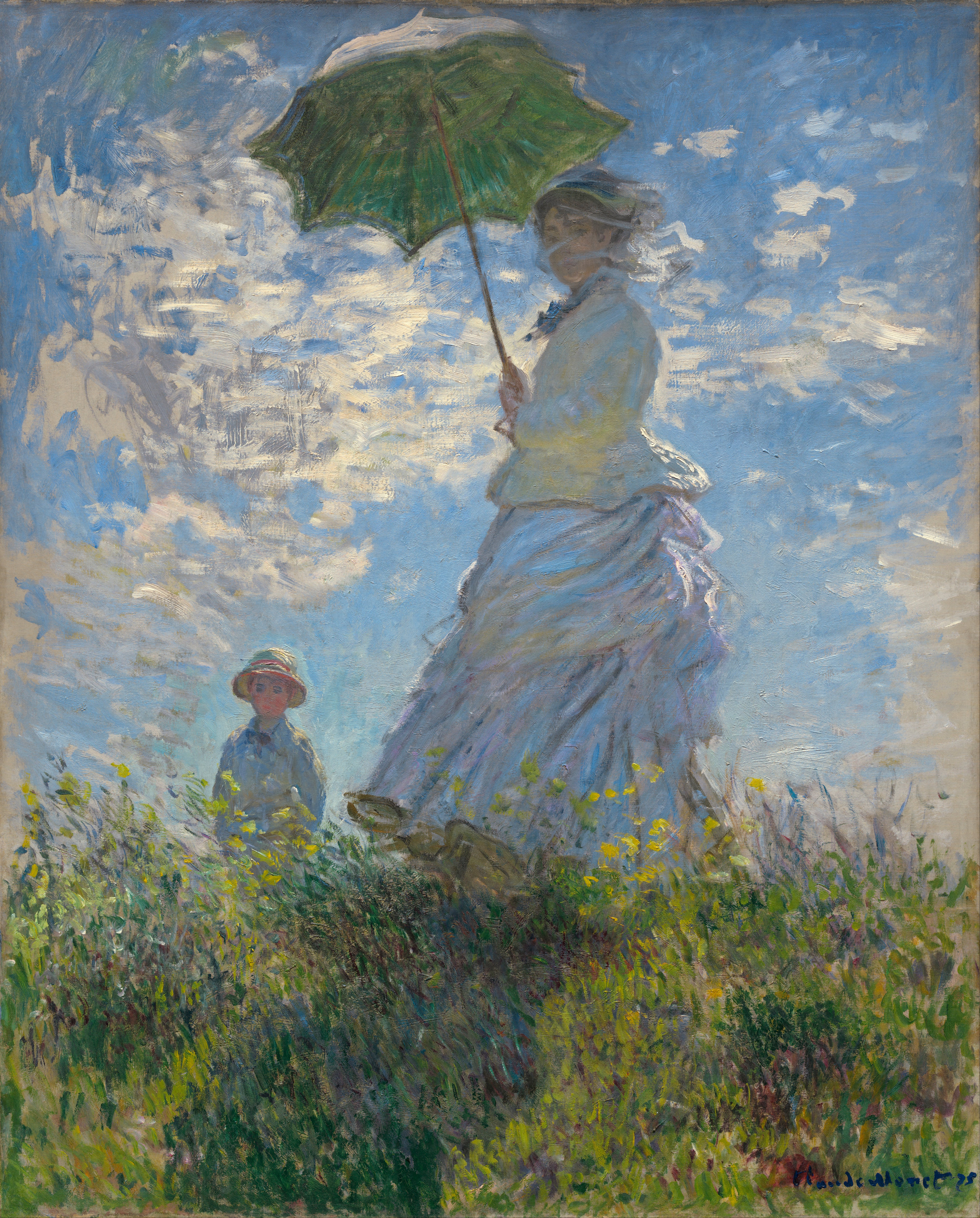
Woman with a Parasol - Madame Monet and Her Son, 1875, National Gallery of Art, Washington DC

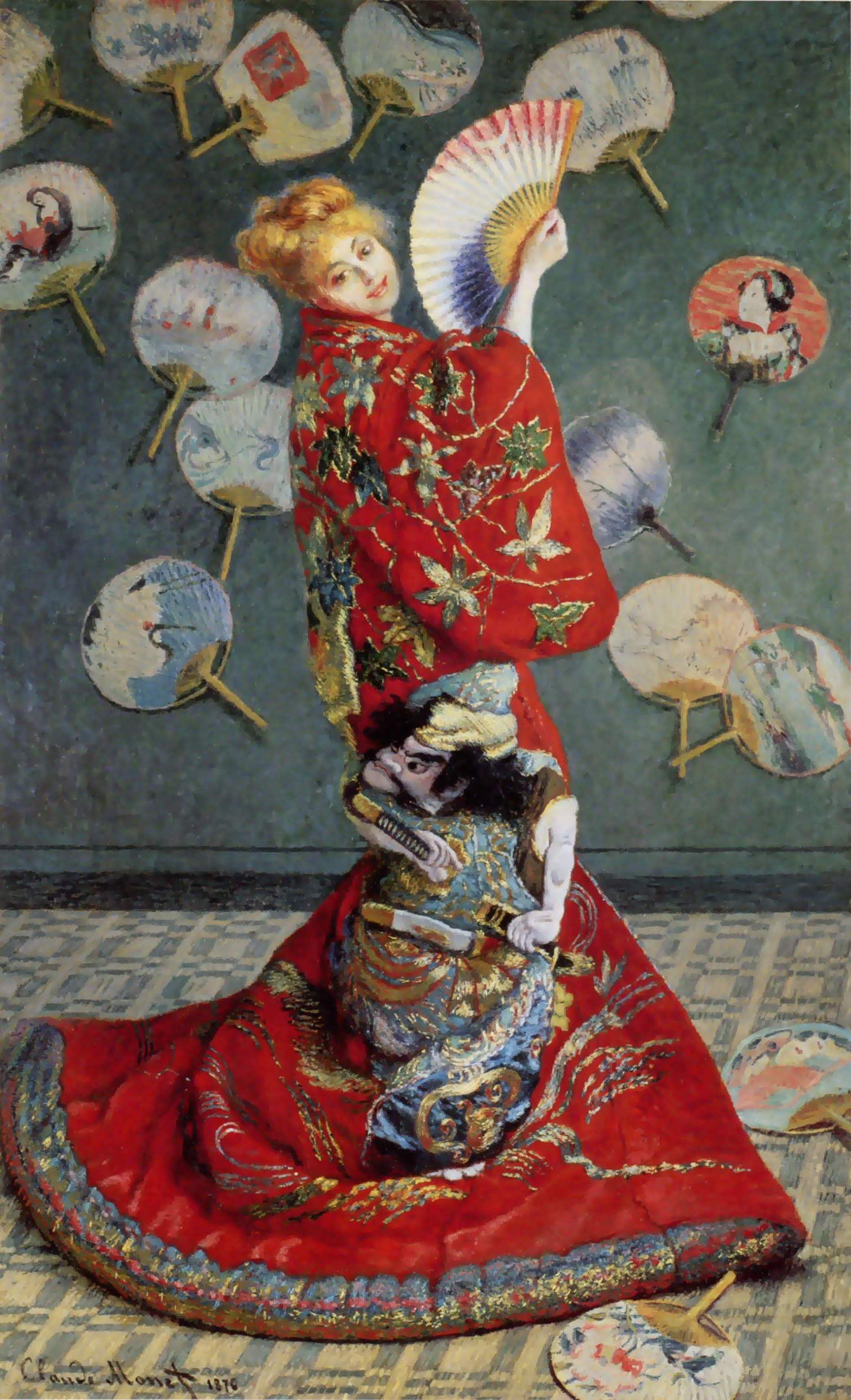
Madame Monet in a Japanese Kimono, 1876, Museum of Fine Arts, Boston

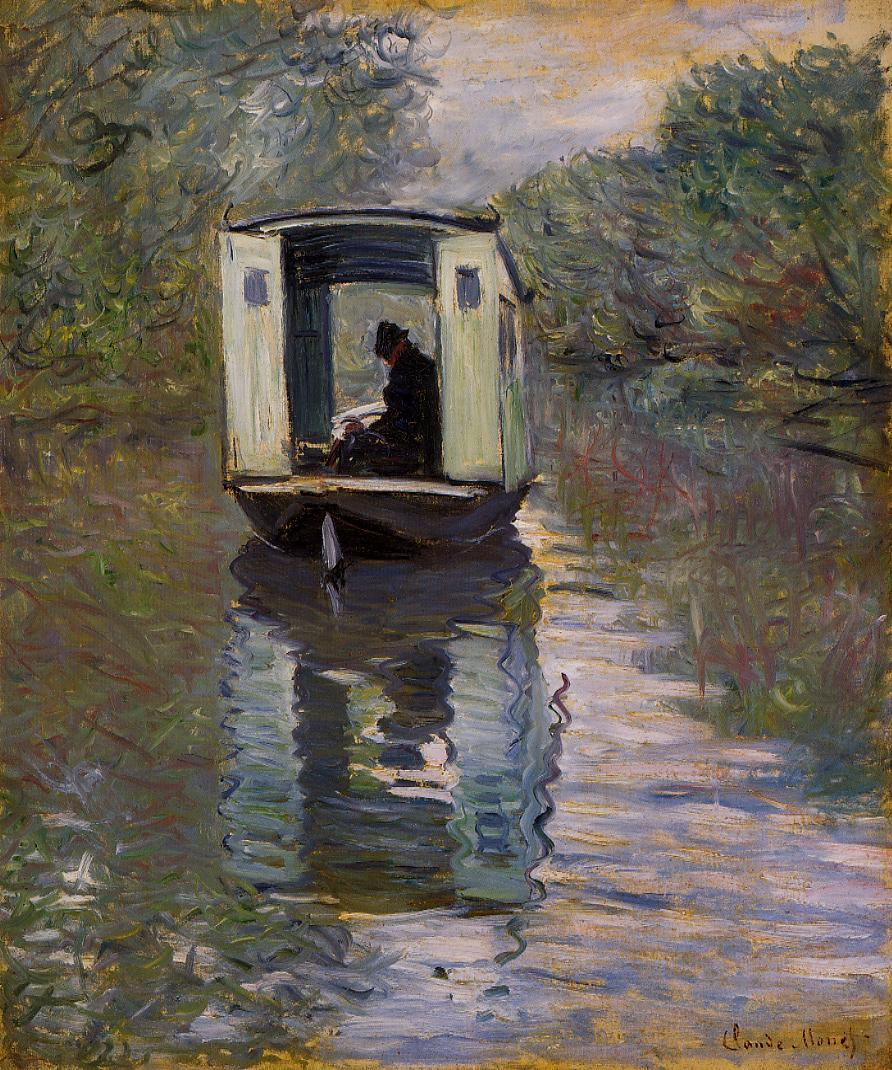
Le Bateau-atelier, 1876, Barnes collection

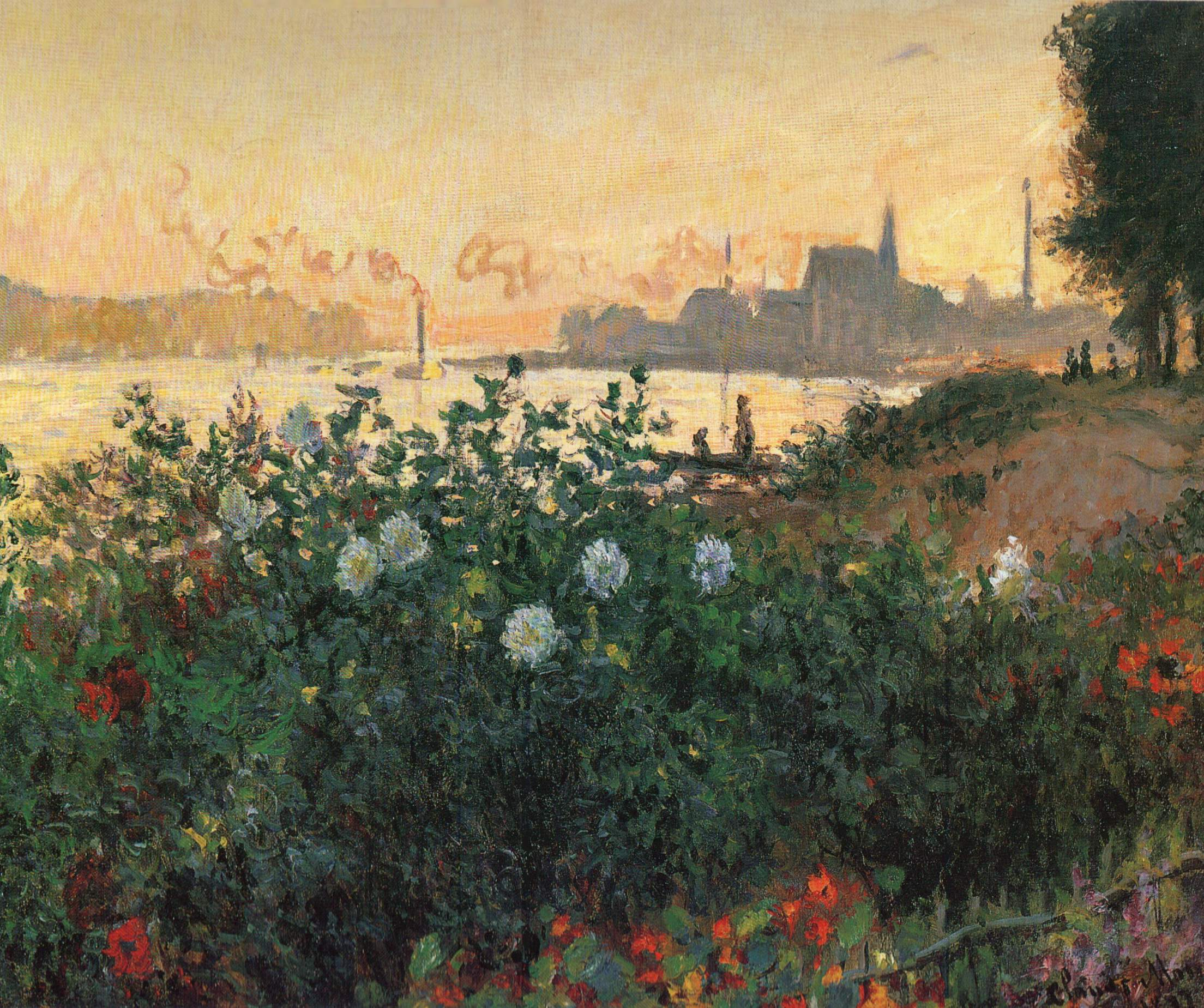
Flowers on the Riverbank at Argenteuil, 1877, Pola Museum of Art, Japan

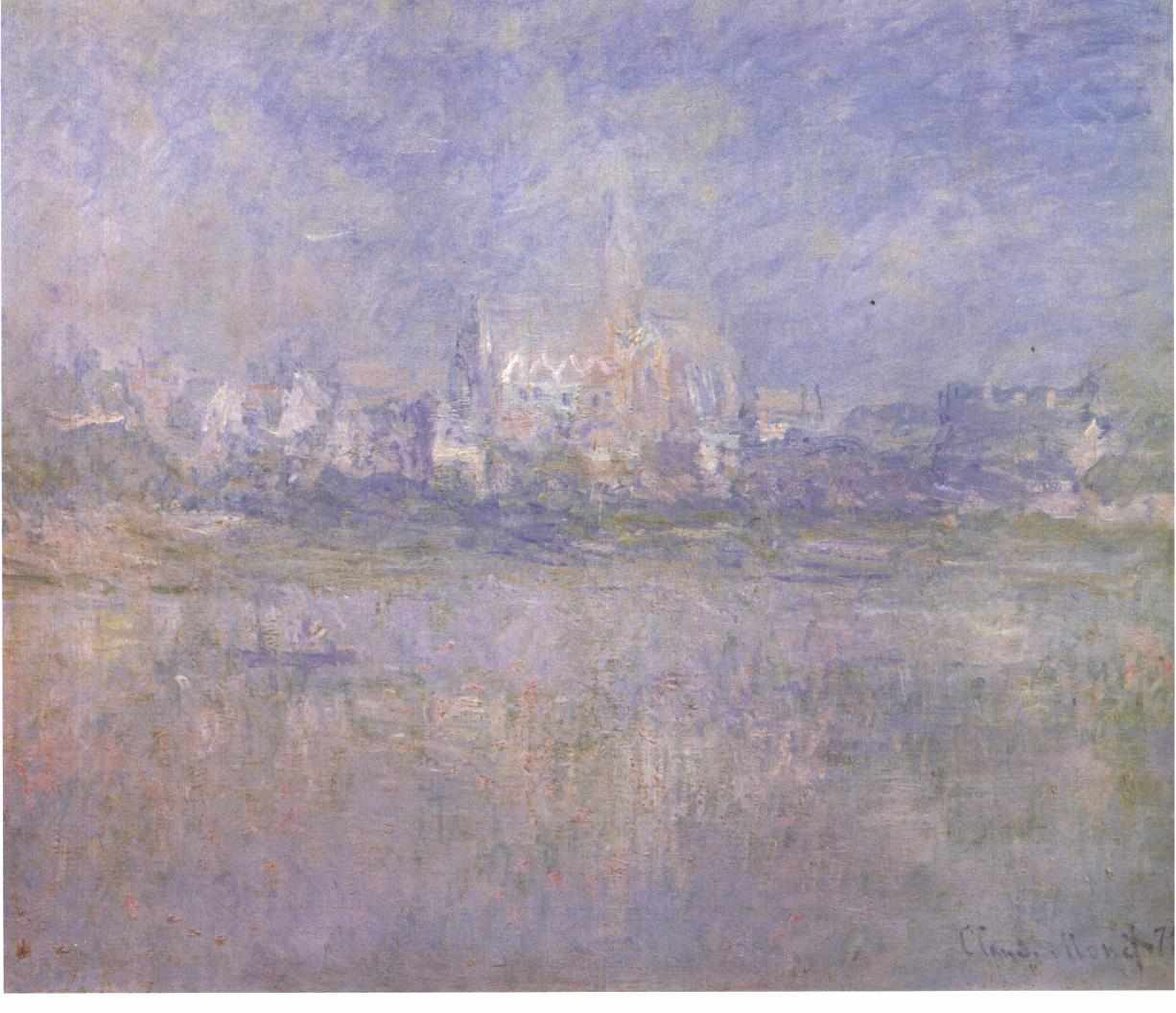
Vétheuil in the Fog, 1879, Musée Marmottan Monet, Paris

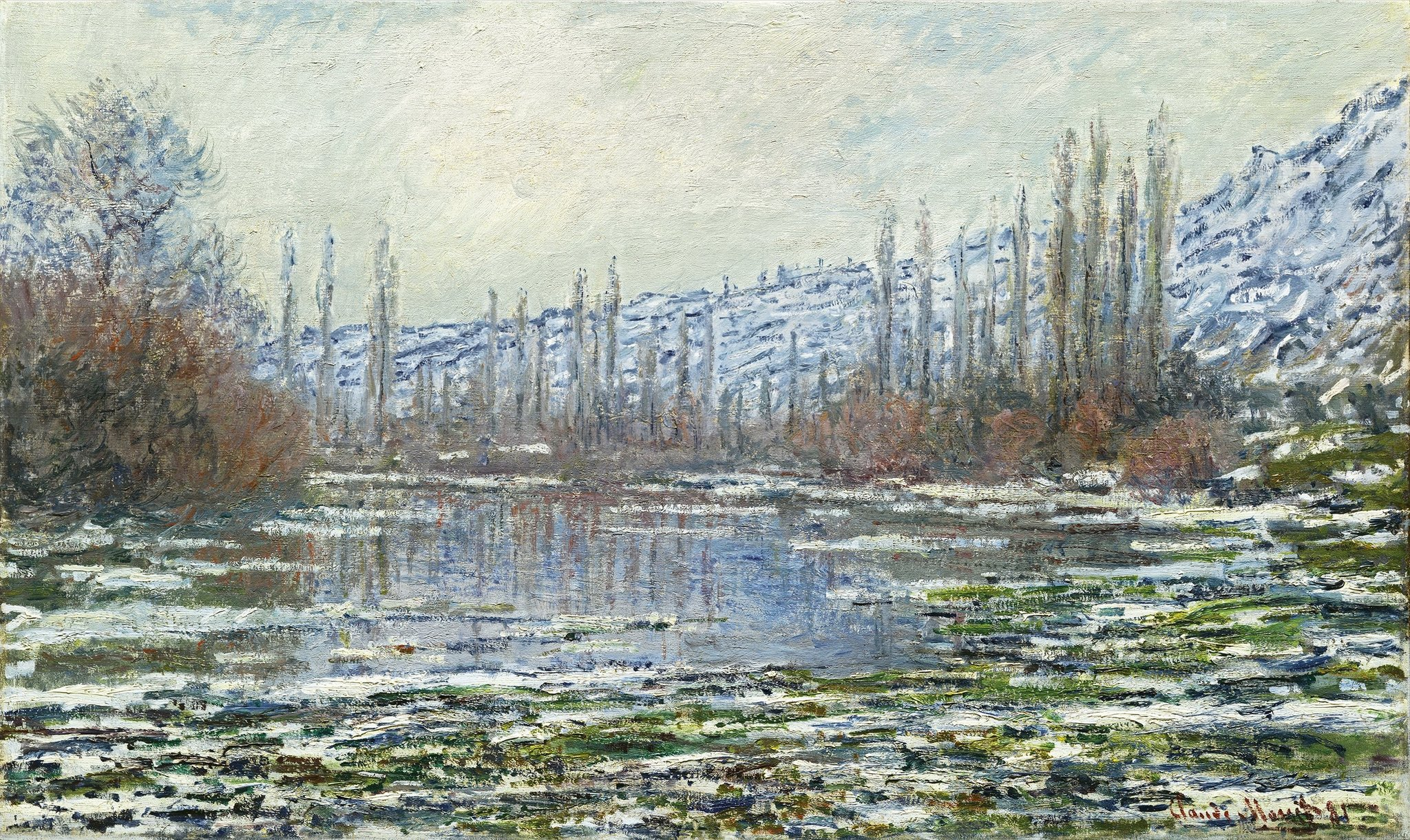
The Thaw at Vétheuil, 1880, Thyssen-Bornemisza Museum, Madrid

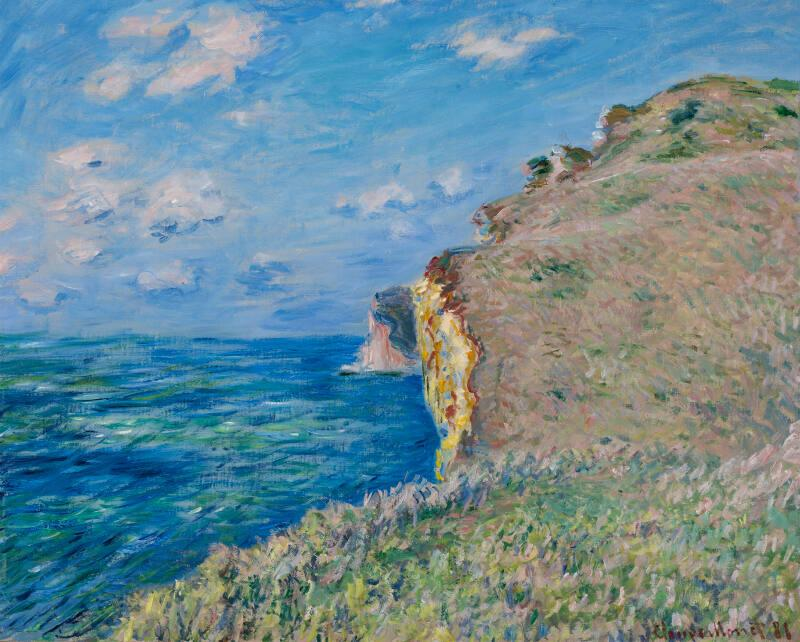
La Falaise à Fécamp, 1881, Aberdeen Art Gallery

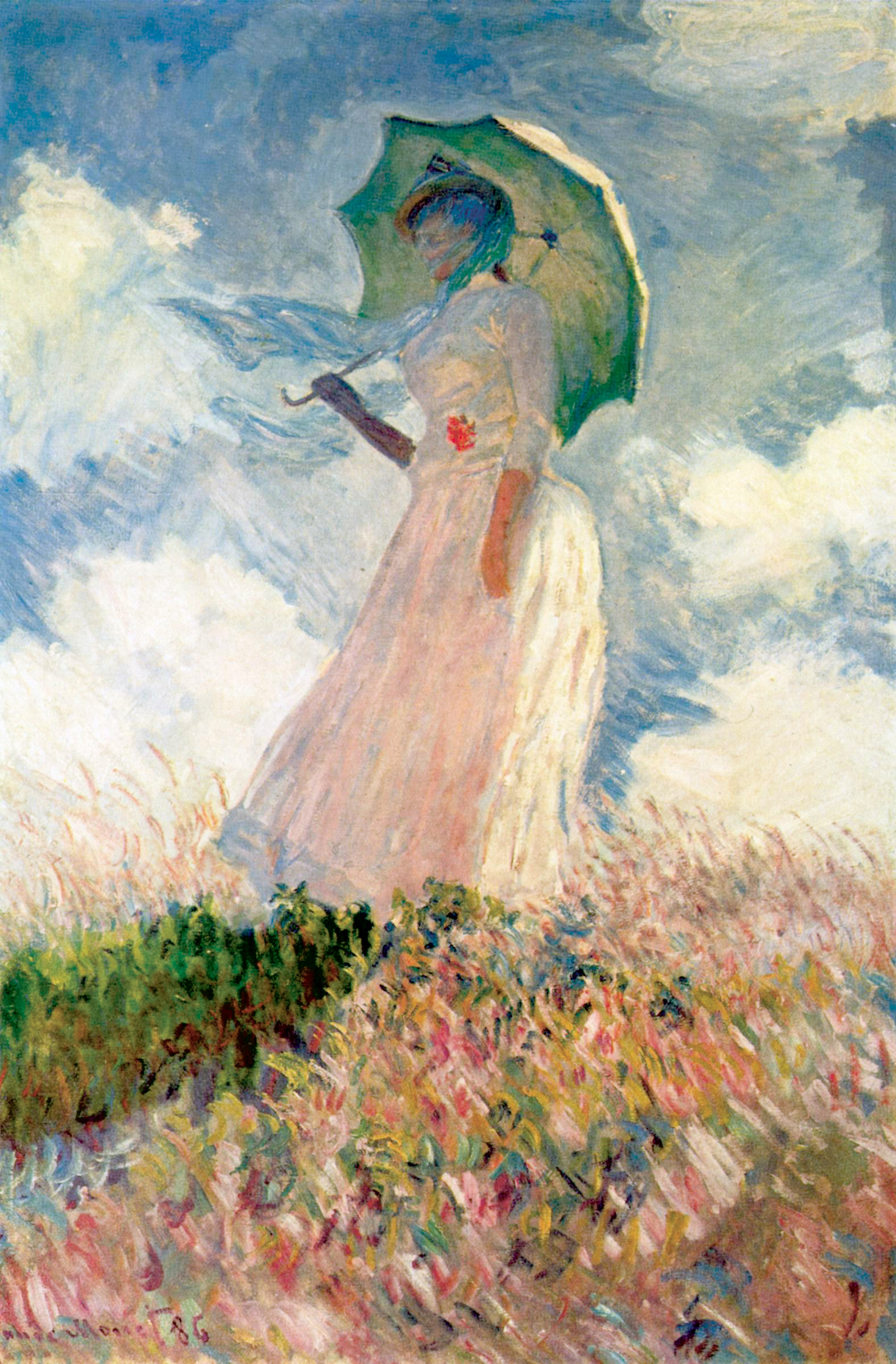
Study of a Figure Outdoors: Woman with a Parasol, Facing Left, (Suzanne Hoschedé), 1886, Musée d'Orsay

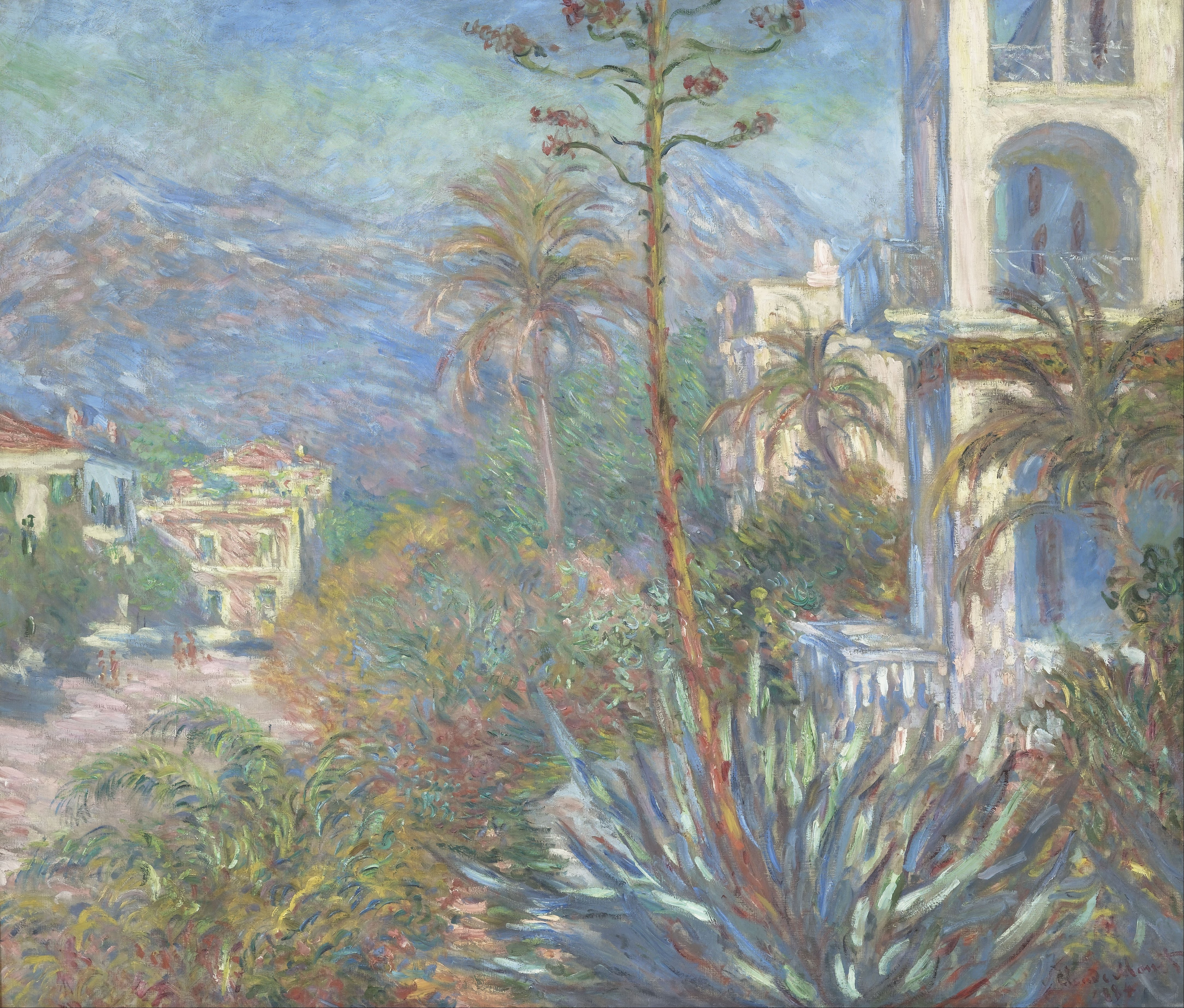
Villas In Bordighera, 1884. Musée d'Orsay Paris

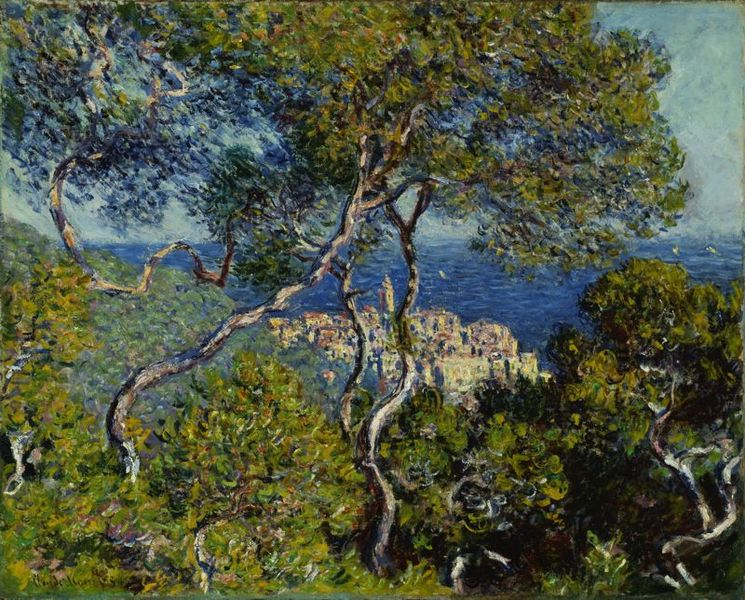
View of Bordighera, 1884. Chicago Art Institute

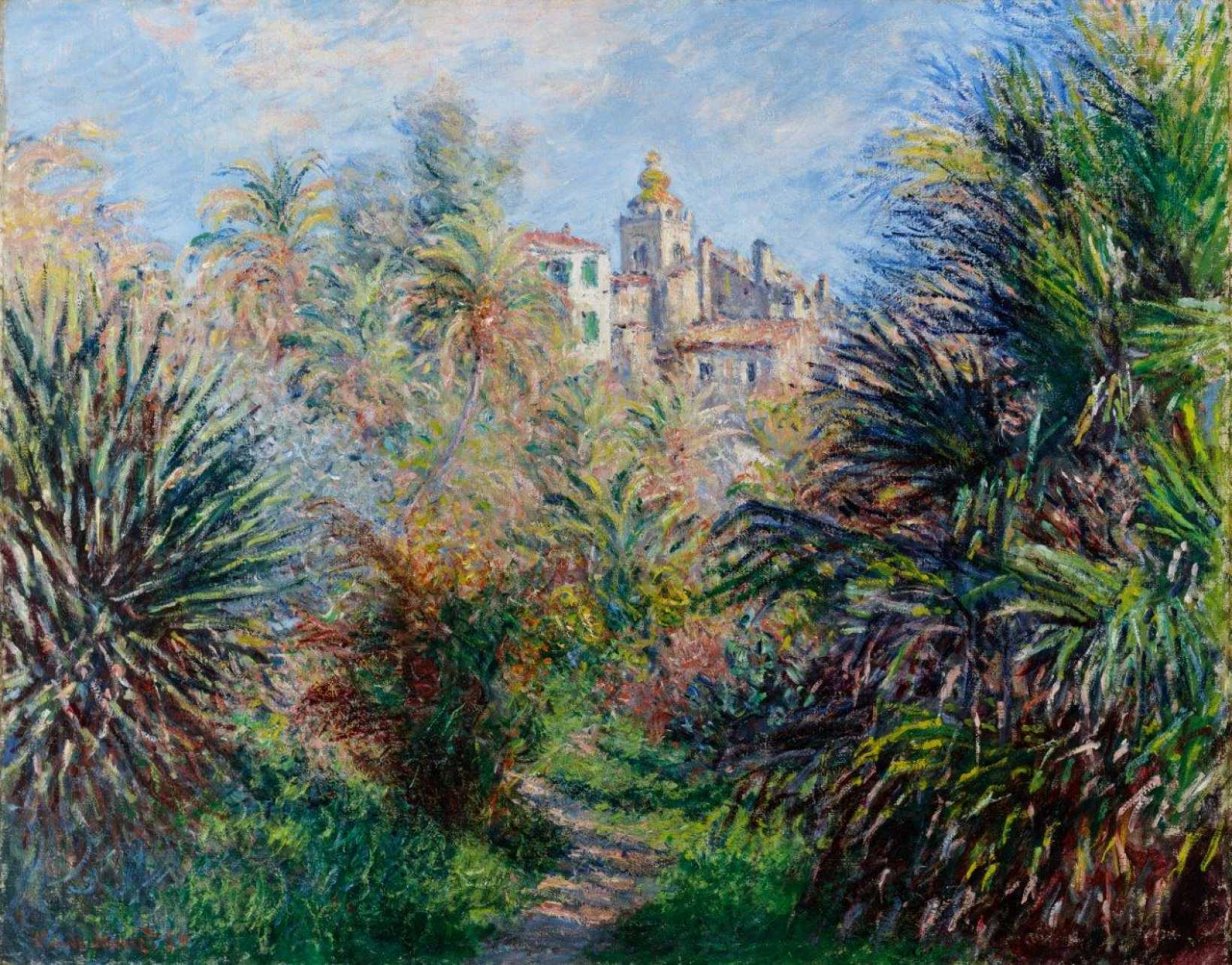
Moreno Garden Bordighera, 1884. The Norton Museum, Miami.

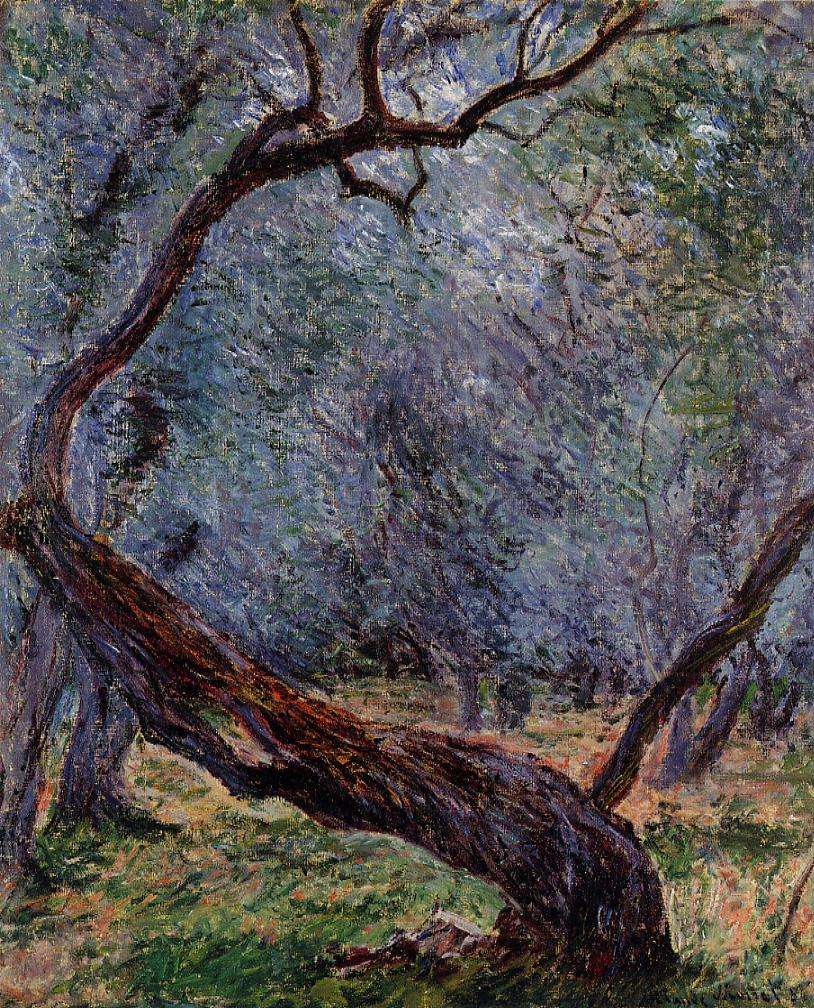
Olive trees study Bordighera 1884. Private Collection.

=== Giverny ===
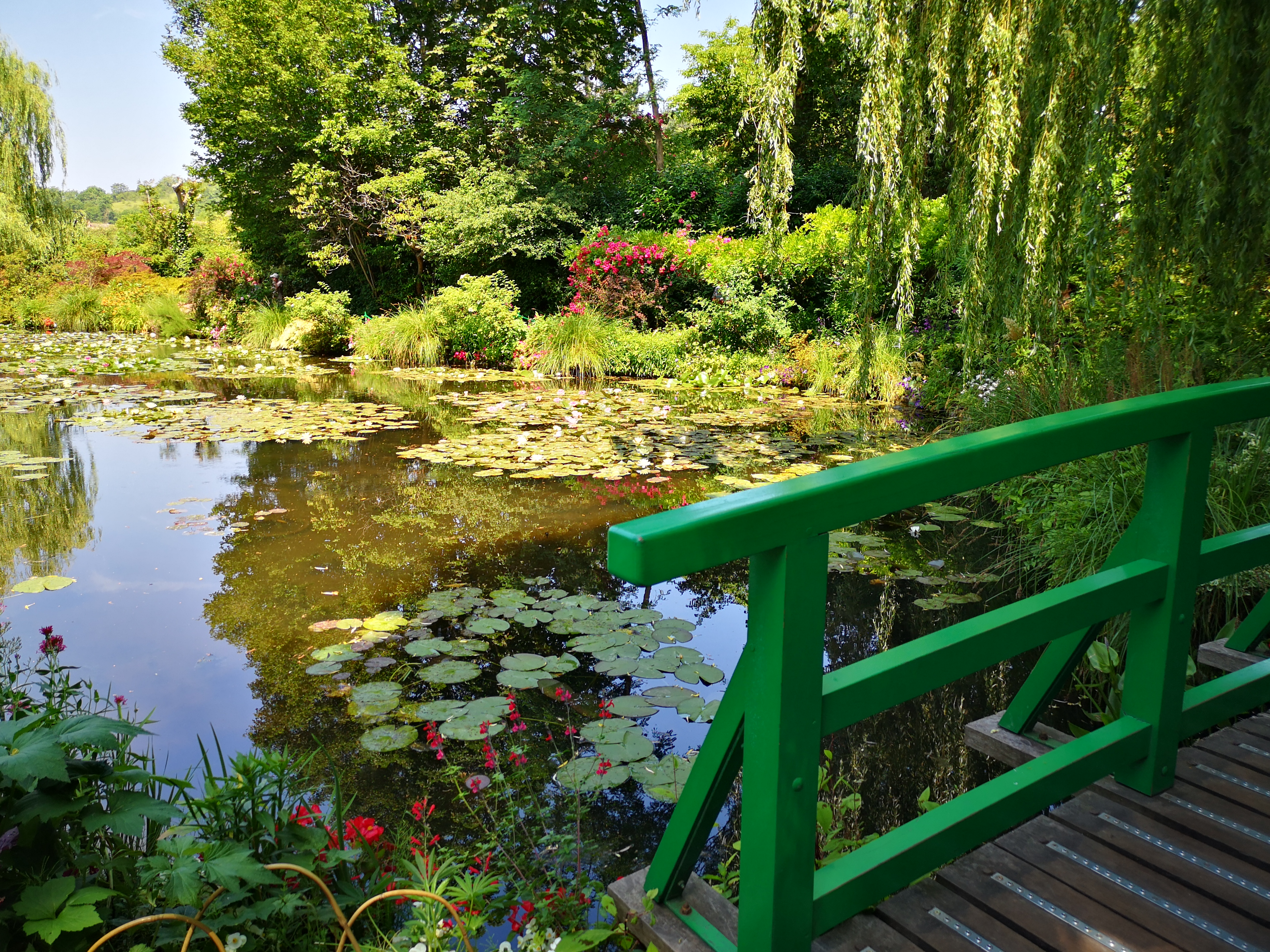
Monet's water garden, 2019

In 1883, Monet and his family rented a house and gardens in Giverny, which provided him with the domestic stability he had not, up to that time, enjoyed. The house was situated near the main road between the towns of Vernon and Gasny at Giverny. There was a barn that doubled as a painting studio, orchards and a small garden. The house was close enough to the local schools for the children to attend, and the surrounding landscape provided numerous natural areas for Monet to paint.

Two days after his arrival at Giverny, Monet received the news that Édouard Manet had died. As he had no money for the train fare to the funeral nor mourning attire, he was forced to petition Durand-Ruel for the necessary money. Besides Monet, among the other pallbearers were Philippe Burty, Théodore Duret, Antonin Proust and Émile Zola.

At Giverny the family worked and built up the gardens, and Monet's fortunes began to change for the better as Durand-Ruel had increasing success in selling his paintings. The gardens were Monet's greatest source of inspiration for 40 years. In 1890, Monet purchased the house. During the 1890s, Monet built a greenhouse and a second studio, a spacious building well lit with skylights. In June 1892, Monet also agreed to provide financial assistance to his longtime friend Camille Pissarro, enabling Pissarro and his family to purchase the house they had rented since 1884 at nearby Éragny-sur-Epte. Referring to their long friendship, Monet wrote to Pissarro, "Nous sommes d'assez vieux amis pour nous rendre des services" ("We are old enough friends to do each other favors").

Monet wrote daily instructions to his gardener, precise designs and layouts for plantings, and invoices for his floral purchases and his collection of botany books. As Monet's wealth grew, his garden evolved. He remained its architect, even after he hired seven gardeners. Monet purchased additional land with a water meadow. White water lilies local to France were planted along with imported cultivars from South America and Egypt, resulting in a range of colours including yellow, blue and white lilies that turned pink with age. In 1902, he increased the size of his water garden by nearly 4000 square metres; the pond was enlarged in 1901 and 1910 with easels installed all around to allow different perspectives to be captured.

Dissatisfied with the limitations of Impressionism, Monet began to work on series of paintings displaying single subjects—haystacks, poplars and the Rouen Cathedral—to resolve his frustration. These series of paintings provided widespread critical and financial success; in 1898, 61 paintings were exhibited at the Petit Gallery. He also began a series of Mornings on the Seine, which portrayed the dawn hours of the river. In 1887 and 1889 he displayed a series of paintings of Belle Île to rave reviews by critics. Monet chose the location in the hope of finding a "new aesthetic language that bypassed learned formulas, one that would be both true to nature and unique to him as an individual, not like anyone else."

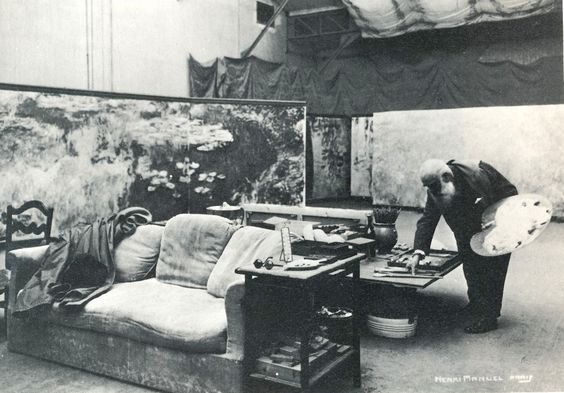
Monet at work in the large studio at his Giverny home

=== London ===
Monet, who had already visited London in 1870–1871, made a first six-week stay in London in September 1899, accompanied by Alice and Germaine Hoschedé, with the aim of both painting and visiting his son Michel, who had been living there since the spring. They stayed in a suite on the 6th floor of the prestigious Savoy Hotel, which offered spectacular views of the Thames and south London. Monet was invigorated by this visit, commenting, "I so love London! But I love it only in winter, for without the fog London wouldn't be a beautiful city. It's the fog that gives it its magnificent breadth."

During their stay the Monets and Alice in particular became friends with English hostess and patron of the arts Mary Hunter (1857–1933). She introduced the Monets to her social circle including her sister Ethel Smyth. Monet returned to the same hotel for two more stays, in February and March 1900 and from January to March 1901. The latter visit was ended by pleurisy, which forced Monet to spend three weeks in his hotel room without being able to paint. During his stays, he painted Waterloo Bridge early in the morning at sunrise, then Charing Cross Bridge in the afternoon. It was during his second stay that he began to paint the Houses of Parliament, from St Thomas' Hospital in the late afternoon and at sunset. Through a doctor based at St Thomas, Mary Hunter had been able to facilitate Monet's access to a suitable vantage point at the hospital. In total Monet produced a series that included 41 paintings of Waterloo bridge, 34 of Charing Cross bridge and 19 of the House of Parliament. The paintings continued to be retouched in the studio until 1904. The series Views of the Thames in London — 1900 to 1904 was exhibited in May and June 1904.

=== Water lilies ===
In 1899, he began painting the water lilies that would occupy him continually for the next 20 years of his life, being his last and "most ambitious" sequence of paintings. He had exhibited this first group of pictures of the garden, devoted primarily to his Japanese bridge, in 1900.

Depictions of the water lilies, with alternating light and mirror-like reflections, became an integral part of his work. By the mid-1910s Monet had achieved "a completely new, fluid, and somewhat audacious style of painting in which the water-lily pond became the point of departure for an almost abstract art". Claude Roger-Marx noted in a review of Monet's successful 1909 exhibition of the first Water Lilies series that he had "reached the ultimate degree of abstraction and imagination joined to the real". This exhibition, Waterlilies, a Series of Waterscape, consisted of 42 canvases, his "largest and most unified series to date". He would ultimately make over 250 paintings of the Waterlilies.

At his house, Monet met with artists, writers, intellectuals and politicians from France, England, Japan and the US. In the summer of 1887, he met John Singer Sargent whose experimentation with figure painting out of doors intrigued him; the pair went on to frequently influence each other.

Garden

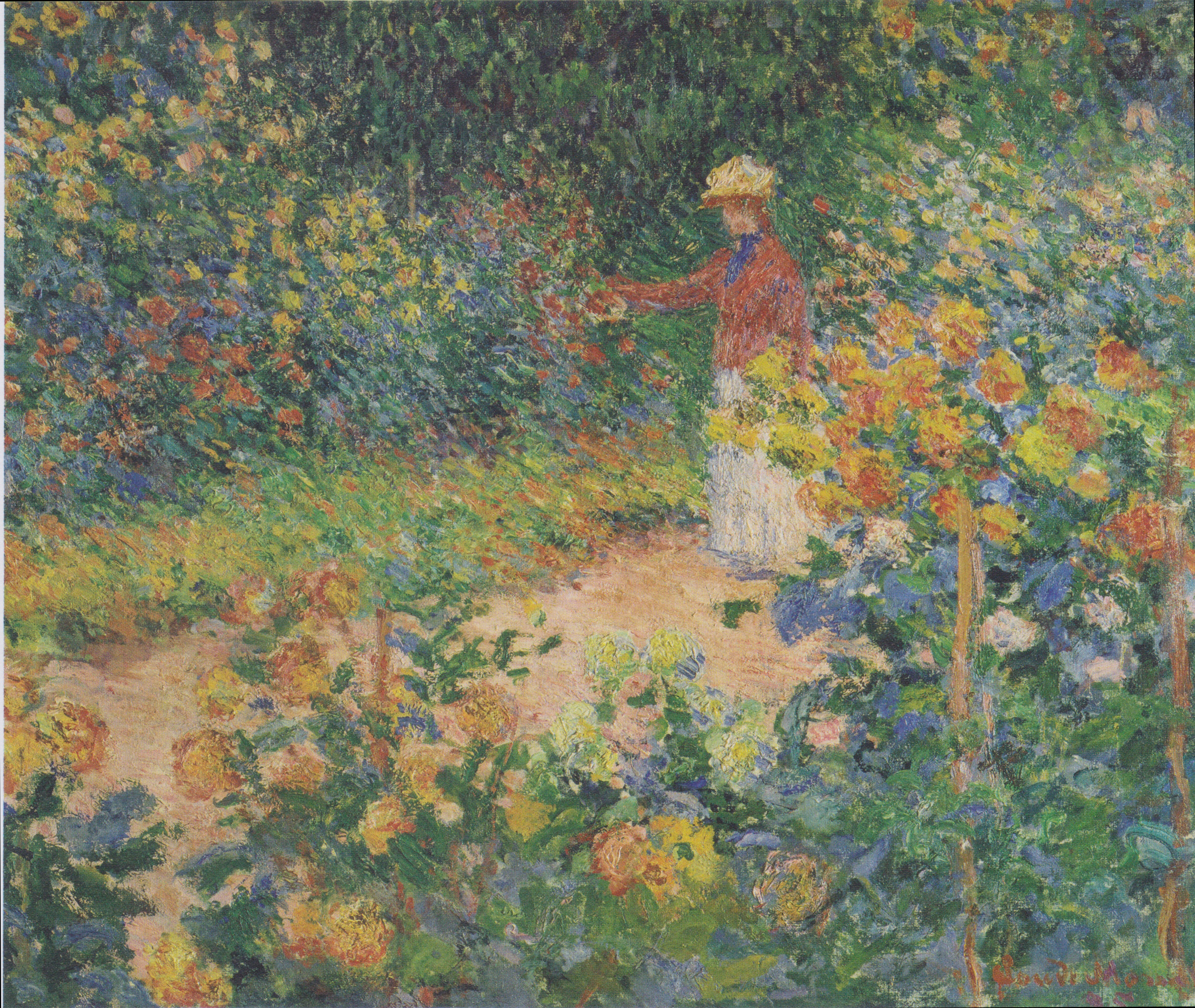
In the Garden, 1895, Collection E. G. Buehrle, Zürich

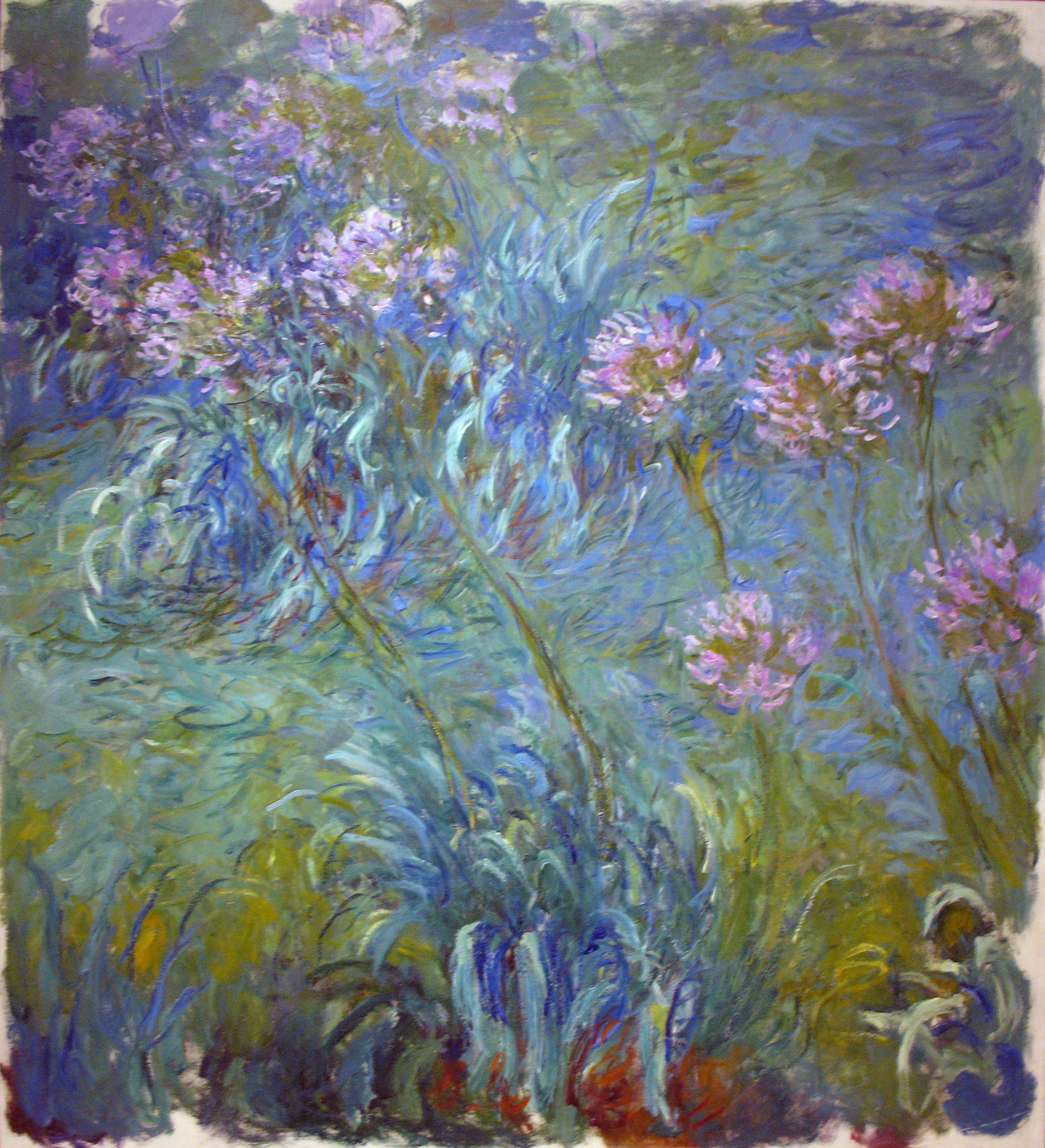
Agapanthus, between 1914 and 1926, Museum of Modern Art, New York

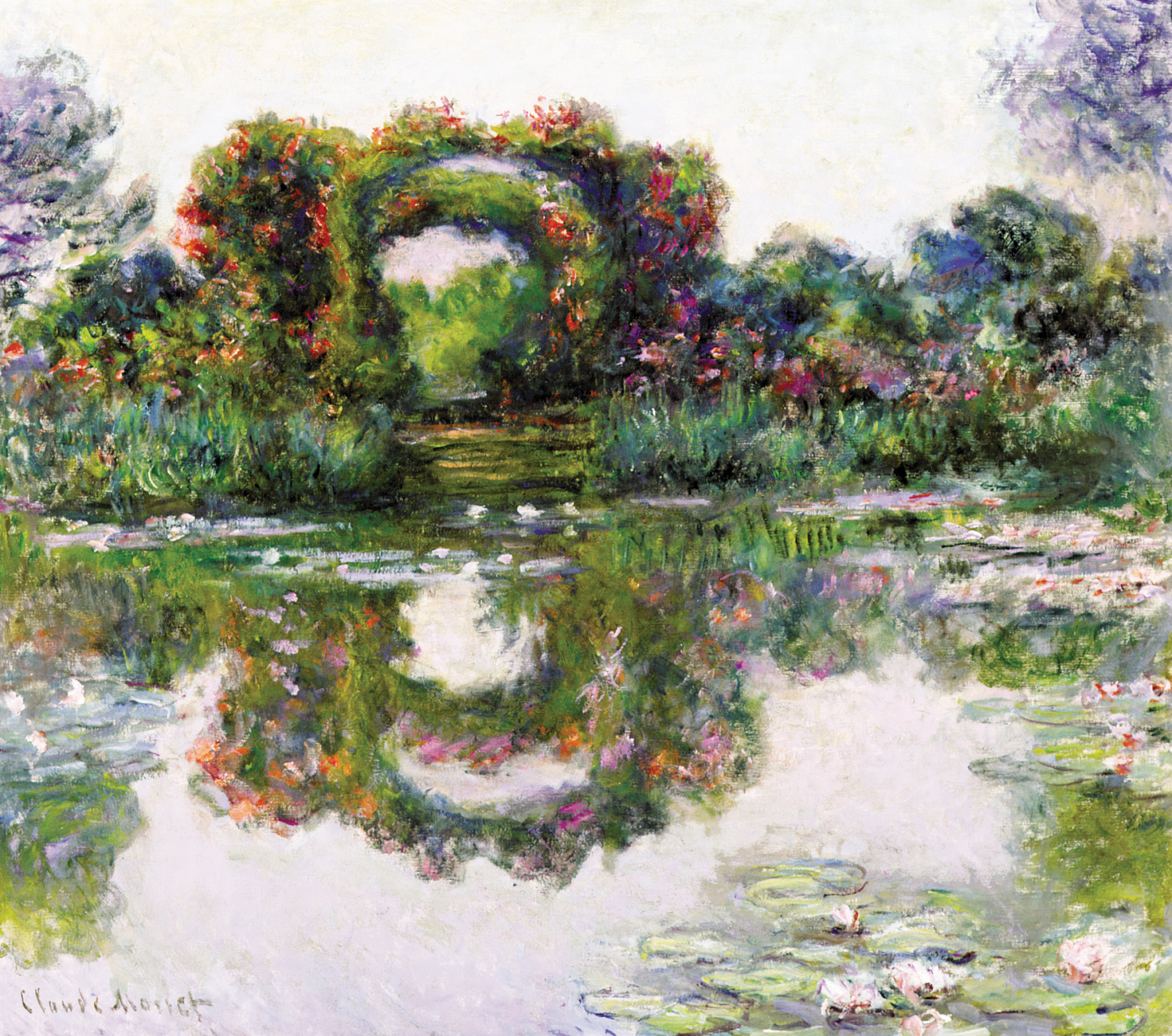
Flowering Arches, Giverny, 1913, Phoenix Art Museum

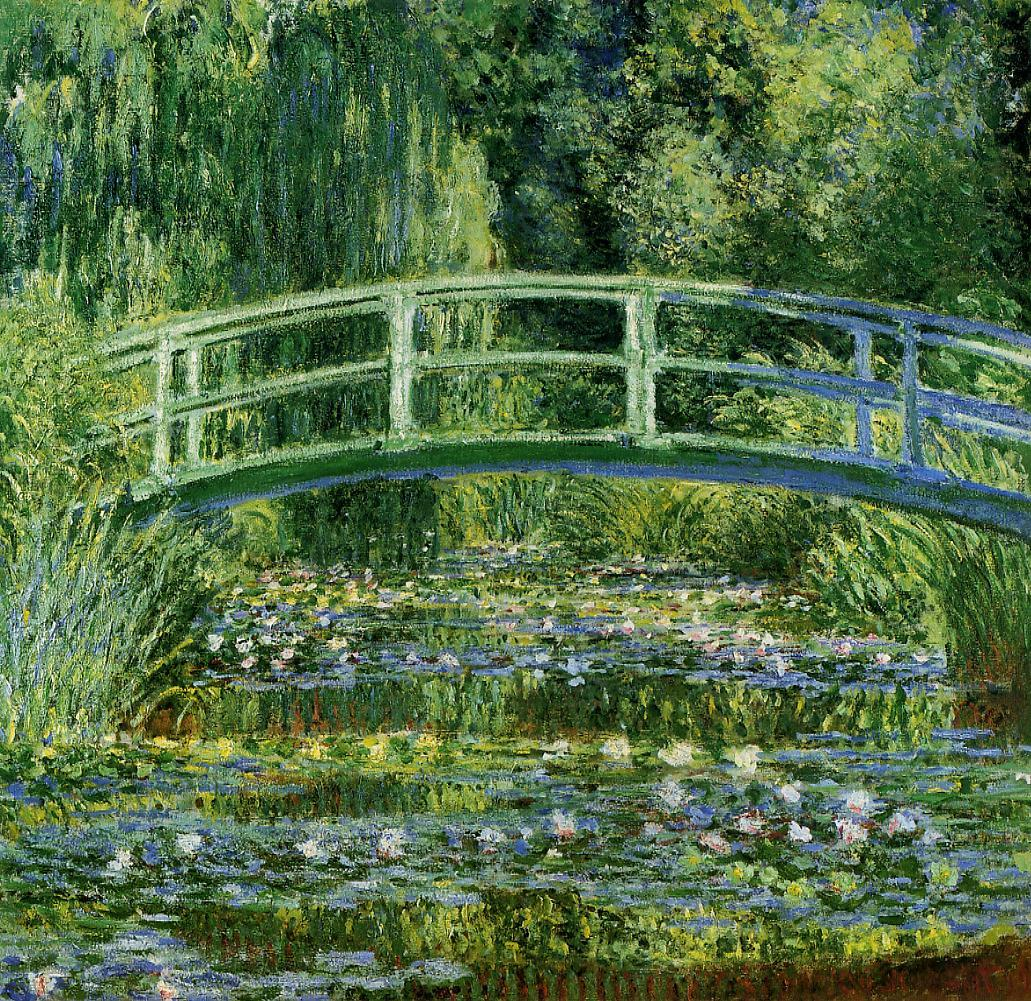
Water Lilies and the Japanese Bridge, 1897–1899, Princeton University Art Museum

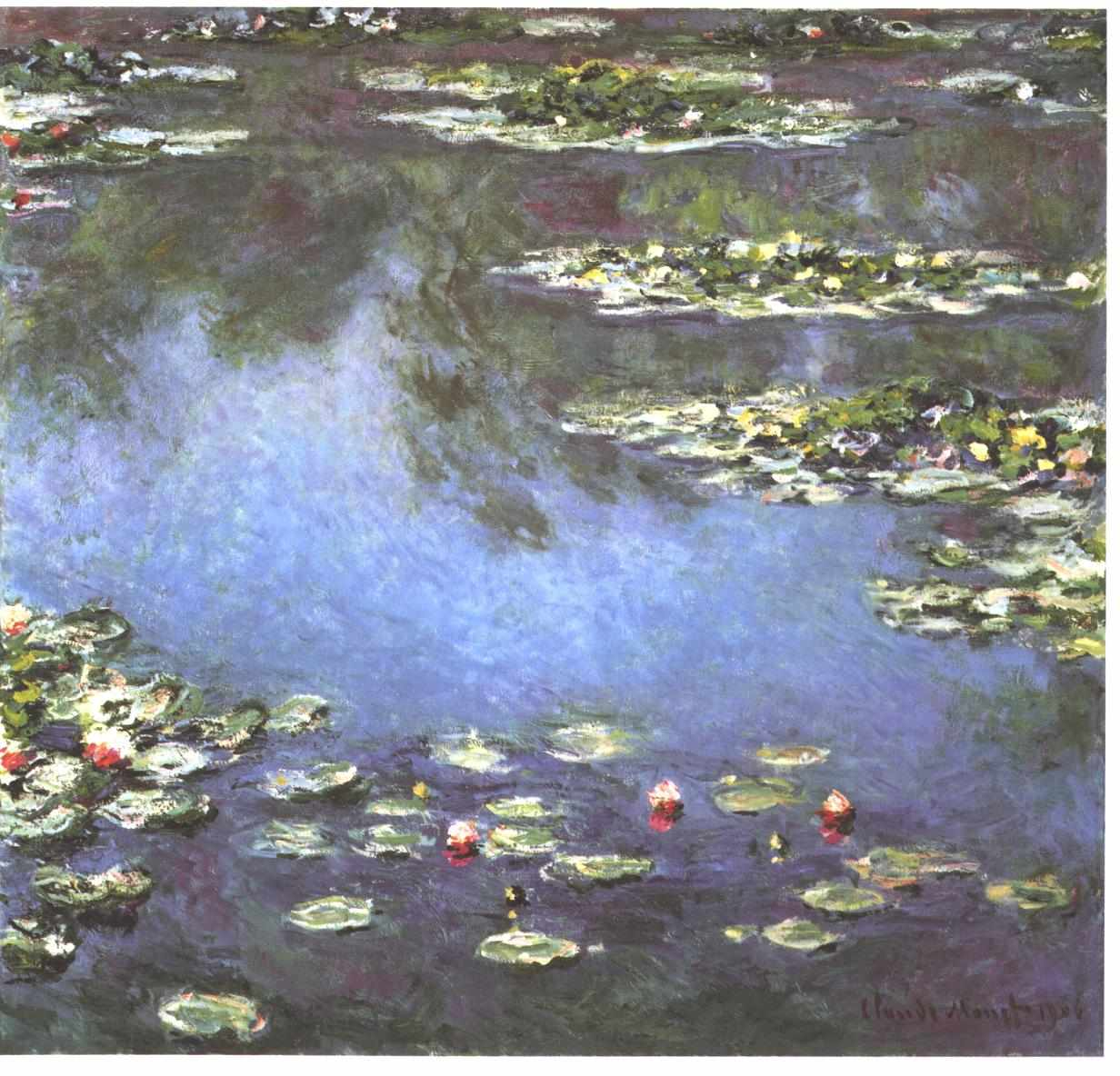
Water Lilies, 1906, Art Institute of Chicago

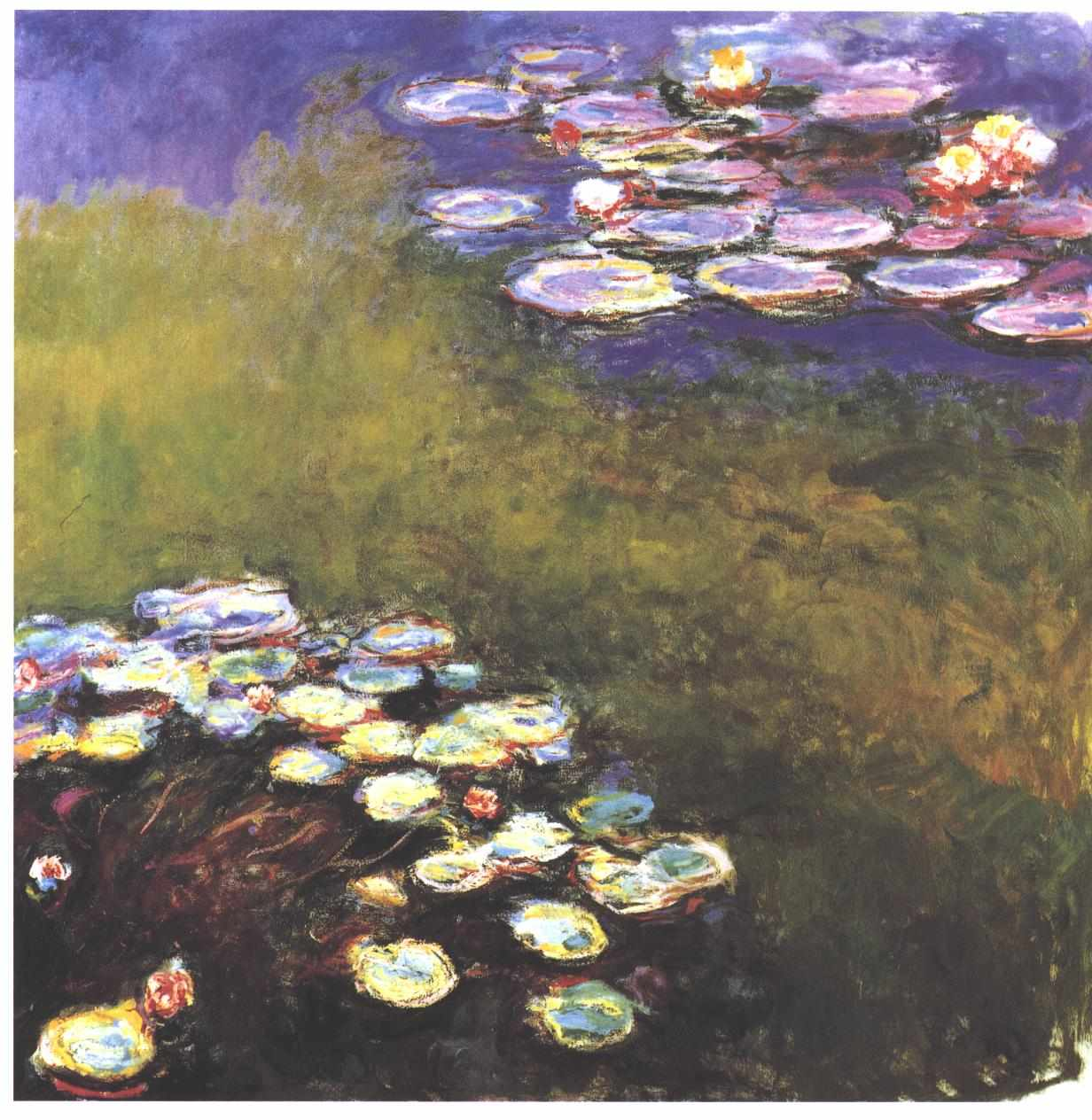
Water Lilies, Musée Marmottan Monet

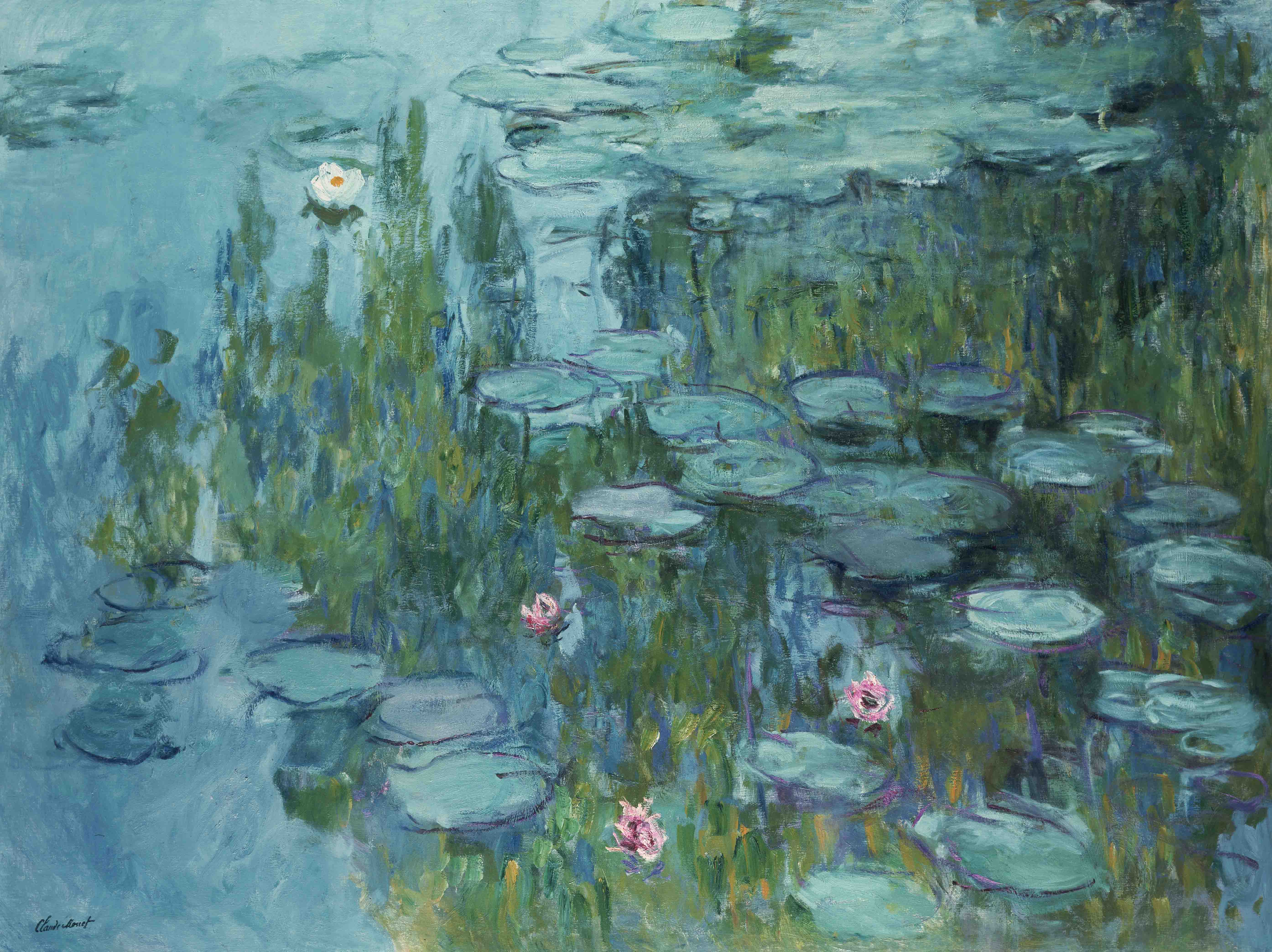
Water Lilies, c. 1915, Neue Pinakothek, Munich

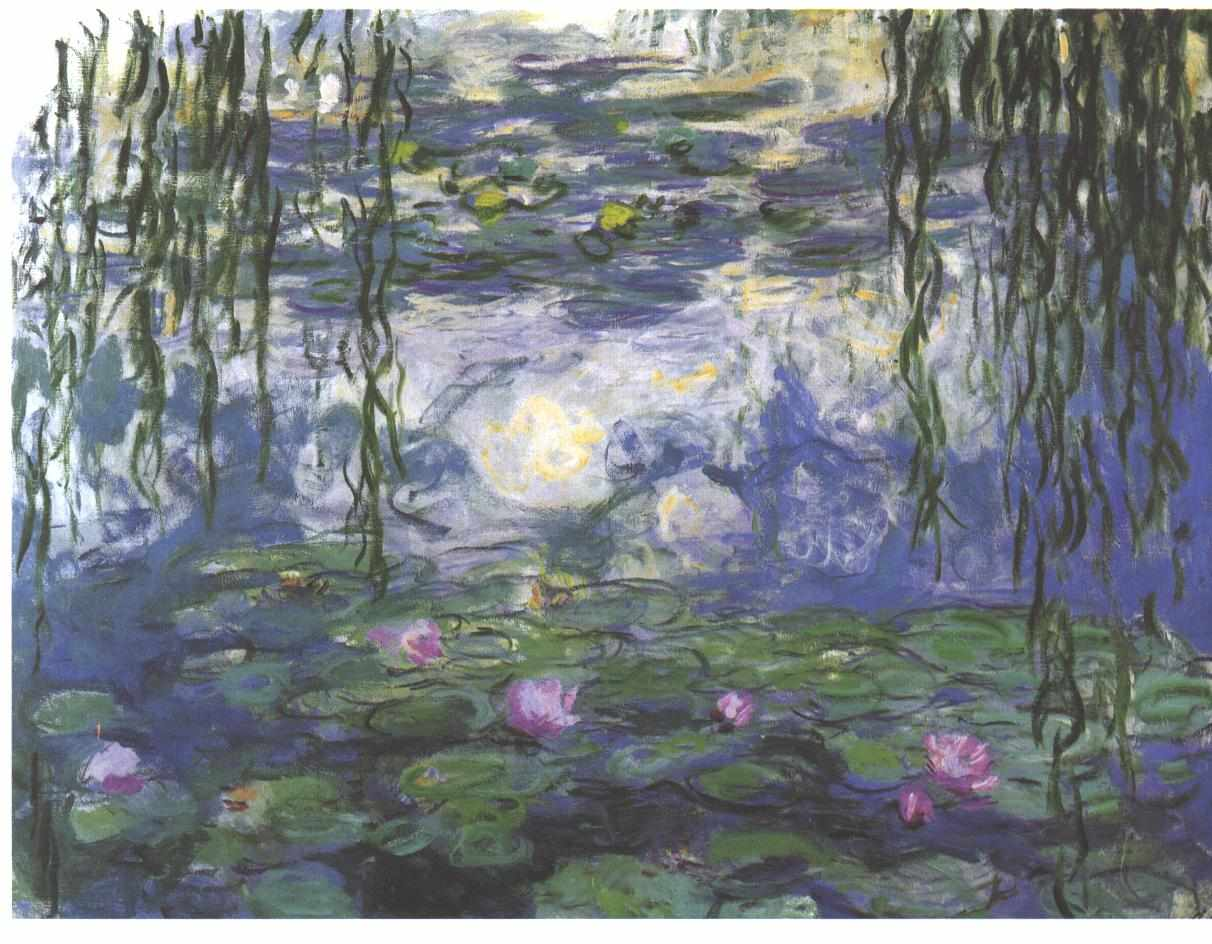
Water Lilies, c. 1915, Musée Marmottan Monet

=== Venice ===
In the autumn of 1908 Alice took up the offer made by her friend Mary Hunter for the Monets to stay with her in the Palazzo Barbaro in Venice which she had rented for the season. Initially Monet was not keen on visiting Venice, as Alice recorded in a letter to her daughter Germaine: "Monet very sad … to leave, he can't bring himself to give up his pond and his flowers. I've heard this so much that, really, it spoils the pleasure of the journey." The Monets arrived in Italy on 1 October. The Monets stayed with Hunter for the last two weeks on her tenancy before the couple relocated to the Hotel Britannia, which was chosen for its views.

Initially Monet only tentatively began painting images of the city but Alice was of the opinion expressed in a letter to Germaine, that Venice "is so beautiful and so created to tempt you, but who can render those marvelous effects. I see only my Monet who can do it." Monet was soon enchanted, writing, "what misfortune not to have come here when I was younger, when I had all the boldness. Still… I've spent delicious moments here, almost forgetting that I was the old man I am." Each day the couple set out by gondola before eight in the morning to explore and paint the city, and after a break for lunch would continue until seven. As they stayed longer and the days became colder Alice hunted for warm clothing to allow Monet to continue painting outside and even managed to obtain a fur coat for him from the young artist Louis Aston Knight. Their three-month stay resulted in Monet creating 37 paintings of Venice, usually in series depicting the same motif at different times of the day, including the Le Grand Canal and five more depicting the same theme, as well as The Doge's Palace Seen from San Giorgio Maggiore, and San Giorgio Maggiore at Dusk. On the way home in December the couple broke their journey for what turned into a four-day stay with Renoir at Cagnes. Once back in Giverny and while not finished Monet sold all of his Venice paintings on 12 December 1908 to the Bernheim-Jeune brothers for 12,000 francs each.

=== Failing sight ===
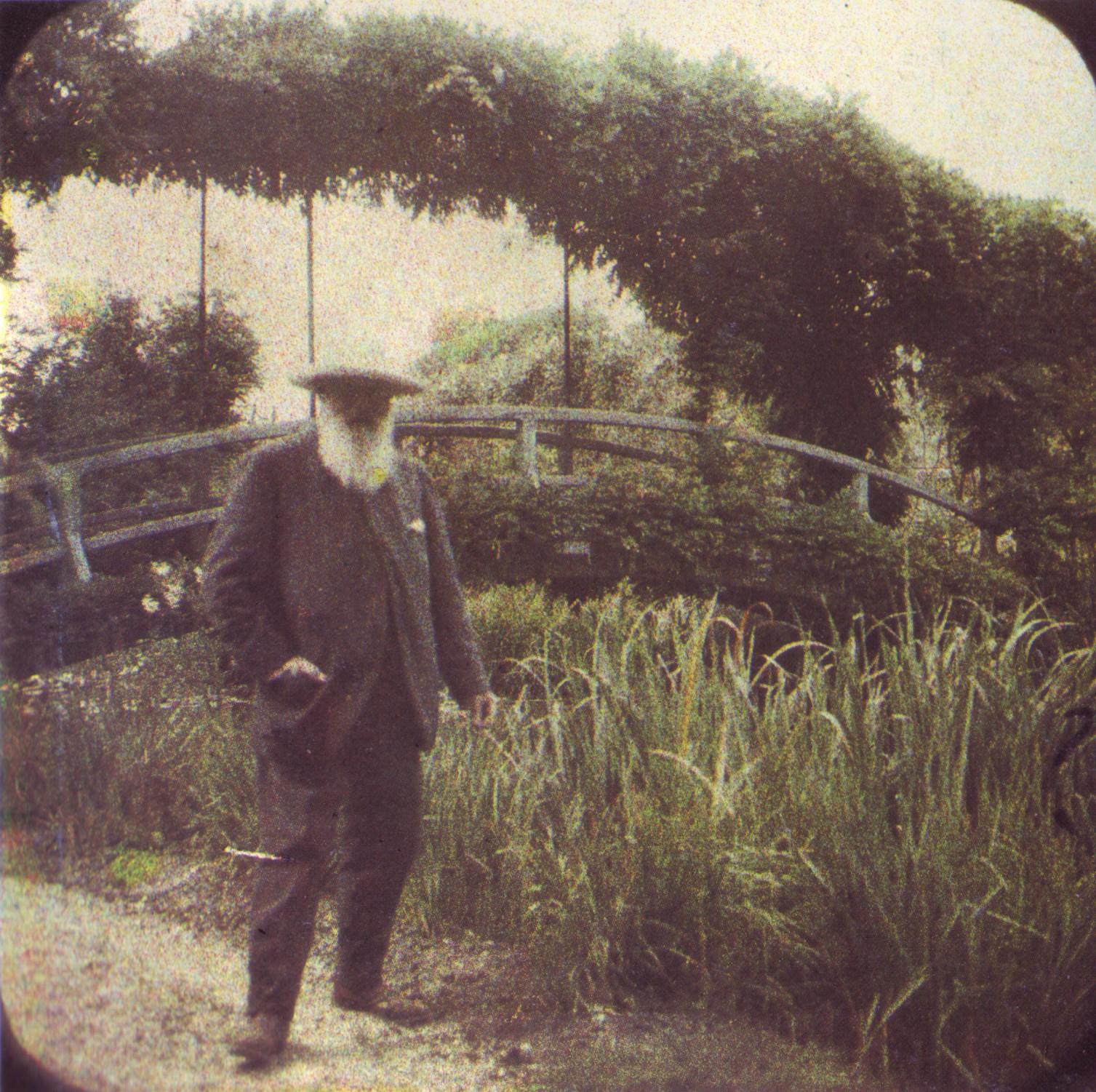
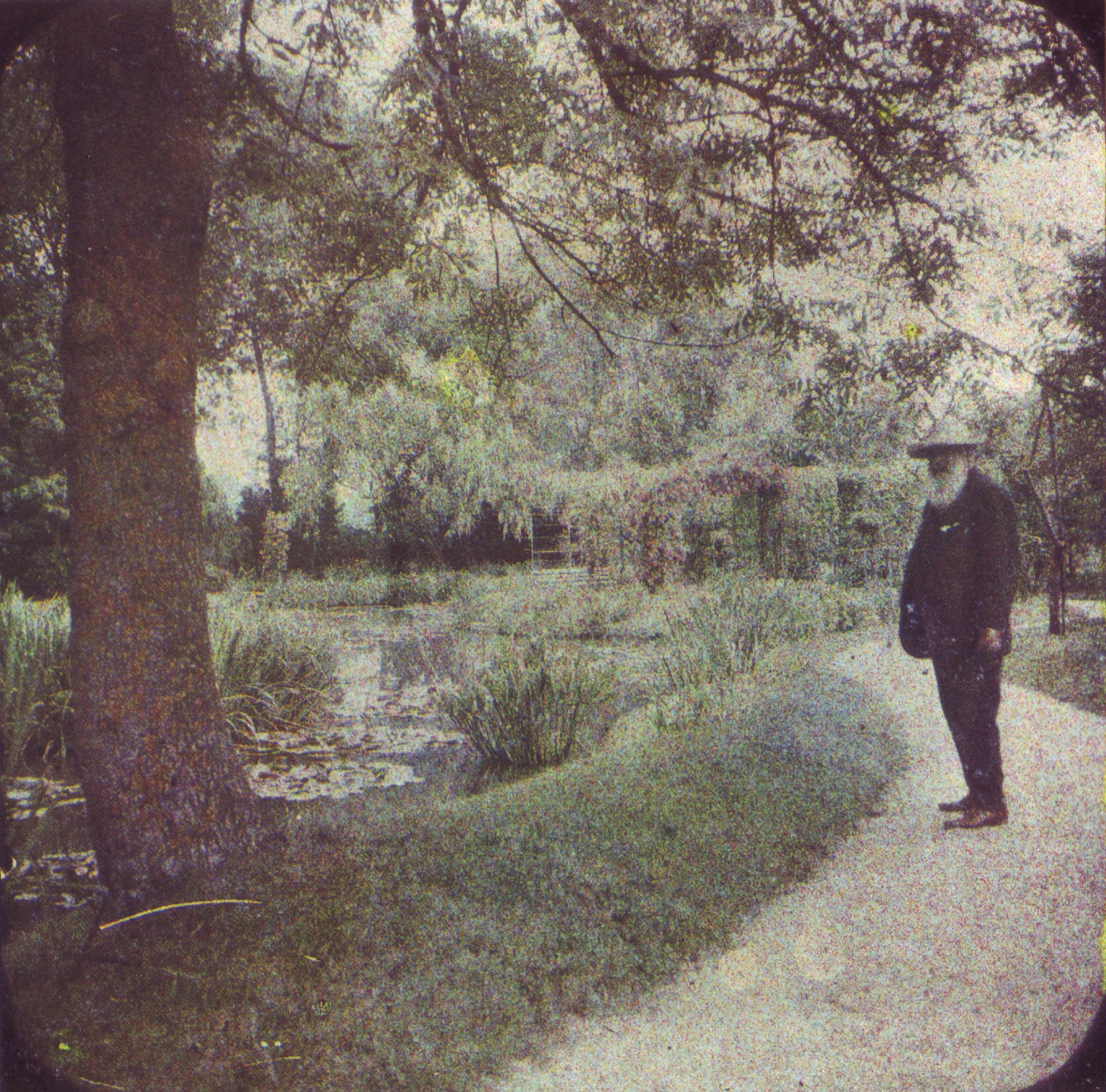
Monet in his garden at Giverny, c. 1917

Monet's second wife, Alice, died in 1911, and his oldest son, Jean, who had married Alice's daughter, Blanche, Monet's particular favourite, died in 1914. Their deaths left Monet depressed, as Blanche cared for him. It was during this time that Monet began to develop the first signs of possible cataracts. In 1913, Monet travelled to London to consult the German ophthalmologist Richard Liebreich. He was prescribed new glasses and rejected cataract surgery for the right eye. The next year, Monet, encouraged by Clemenceau, made plans to construct a new, large studio that he could use to create a "decorative cycle of paintings devoted to the water garden".

In the following years, his perception of colour suffered; his broad strokes were broader and his paintings were increasingly darker. To achieve his desired outcome, he began to label his tubes of paint, kept a strict order on his palette and wore a straw hat to negate glare. He approached painting by formulating the ideas and features in his mind, taking the "motif in large masses" and transcribing them through memory and imagination. This was due to him being "insensitive" to the "finer shades of tonalities and colors seen close up".

Monet's output decreased as he became withdrawn, although he did produce several panel paintings for the French Government, from 1914 to 1918 to great financial success and he would later create works for the state. His work on the "cycle of paintings" mostly occurred around 1916 to 1921. Cataract surgery was once again recommended, this time by Clemenceau. Monet—who was apprehensive, following Honoré Daumier and Mary Cassatt's botched surgeries—stated that he would rather have poor sight and perhaps abandon painting than forego "a little of these things that I love". In 1919, Monet began a series of landscape paintings, "in full force" although he was not pleased with the outcome. By October, the weather caused Monet to cease plein air painting and the next month he sold four of the eleven Water Lilies paintings, despite his then-reluctance to relinquish his work. The series inspired praise from his peers; his later works were well received by dealers and collectors, and he received 200,000 francs from one collector.

In 1922 a prescription of mydriatics provided short-lived relief. He eventually underwent cataract surgery in 1923. Persistent cyanopsia and aphakic spectacles proved to be a struggle. Now "able to see the real colours", he began to destroy canvases from his pre-operative period. Upon receiving tinted Zeiss lenses, Monet was laudatory, although his left eye soon had to be entirely covered by a black lens. By 1925, his visual impairment was improved and he began to retouch some of his pre-operative works, with bluer water lilies than before.

During World War I, in which his younger son, Michel, served, Monet painted a Weeping Willow series as homage to the French fallen soldiers. He became deeply dedicated to the decorations of his garden during the war.

Late paintings

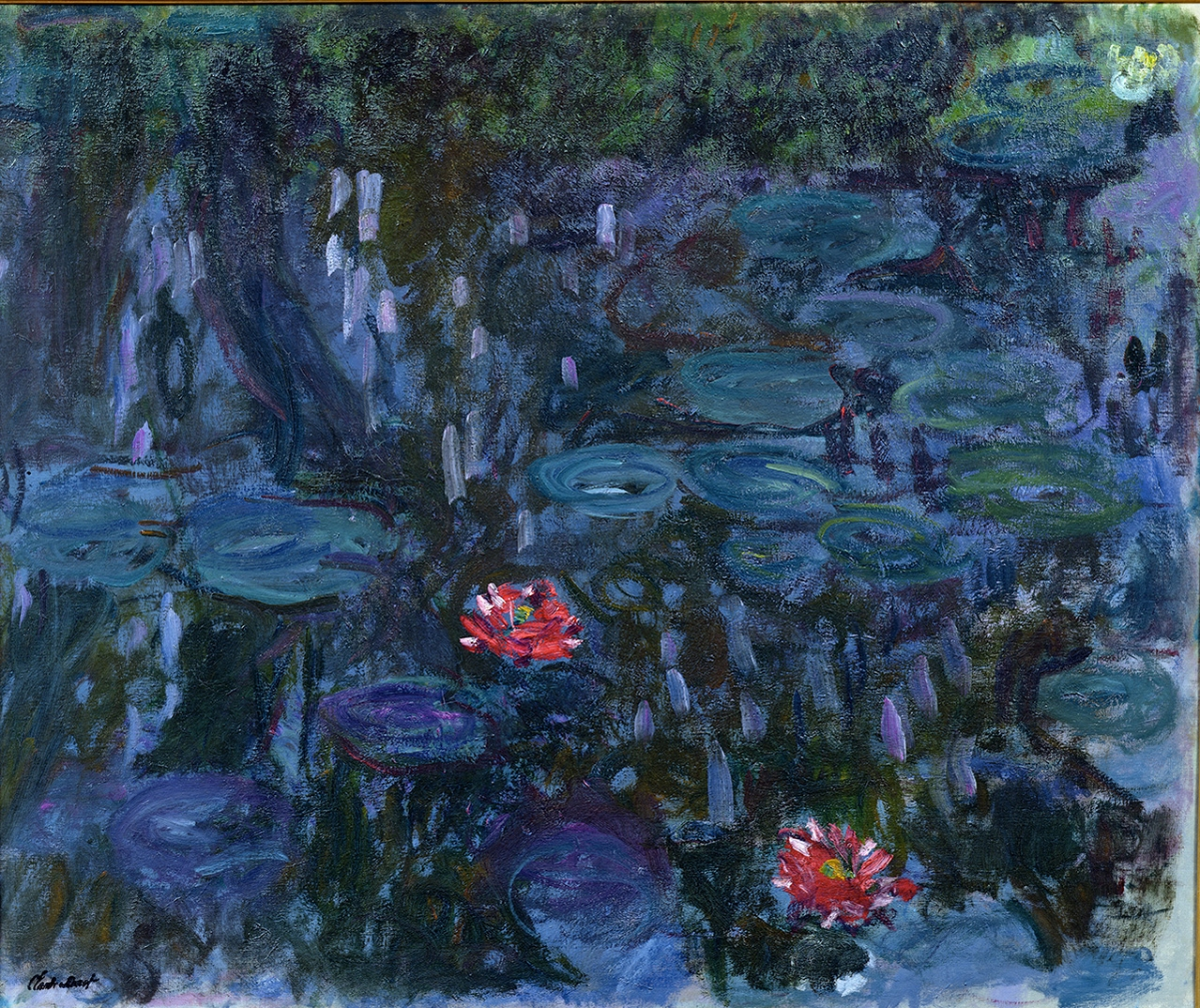
Water Lilies and Reflections of a Willow (1916–1919), Musée Marmottan Monet

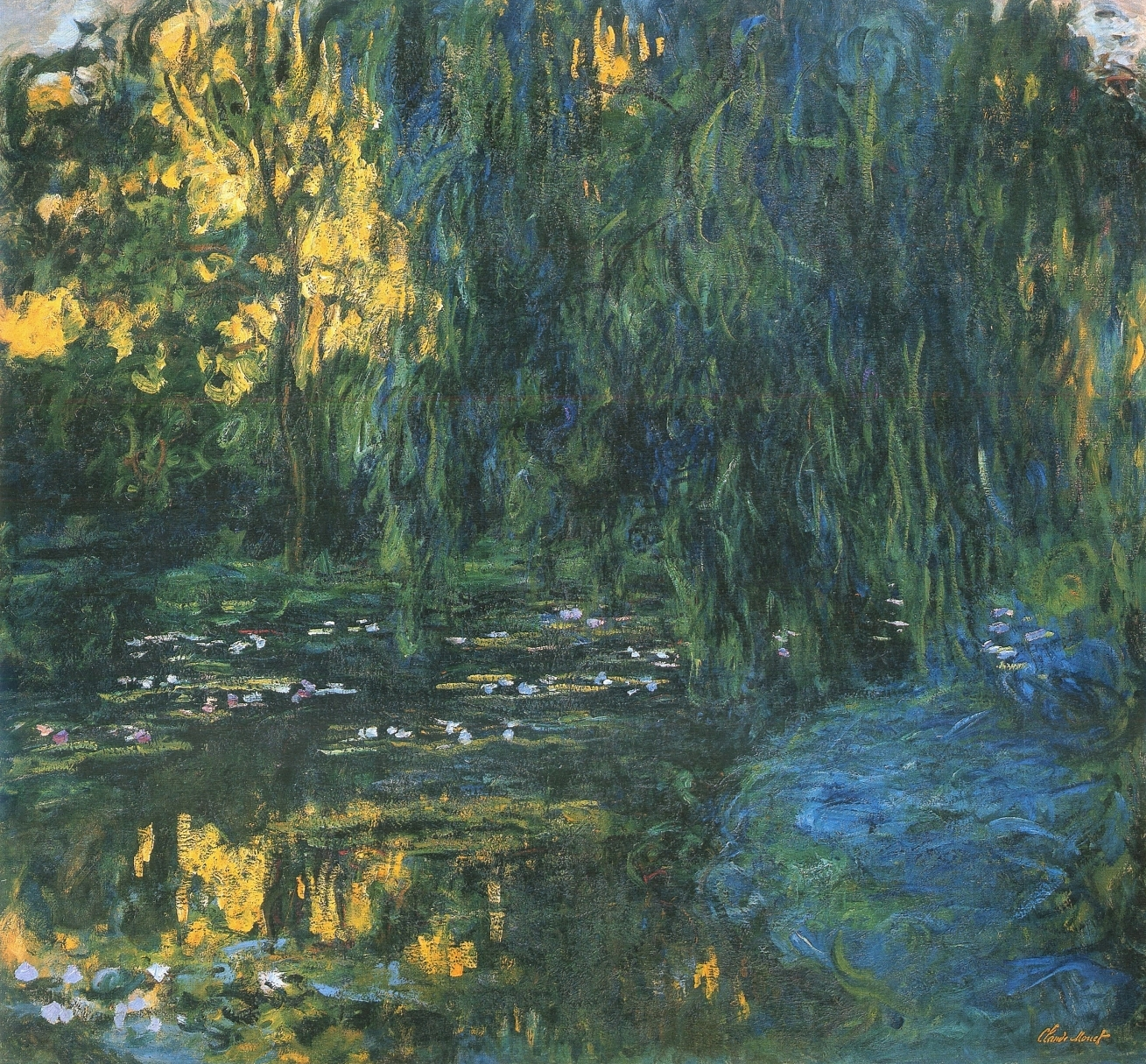
Water-Lily Pond and Weeping Willow, 1916–1919, Sale Christie's New York, 1998

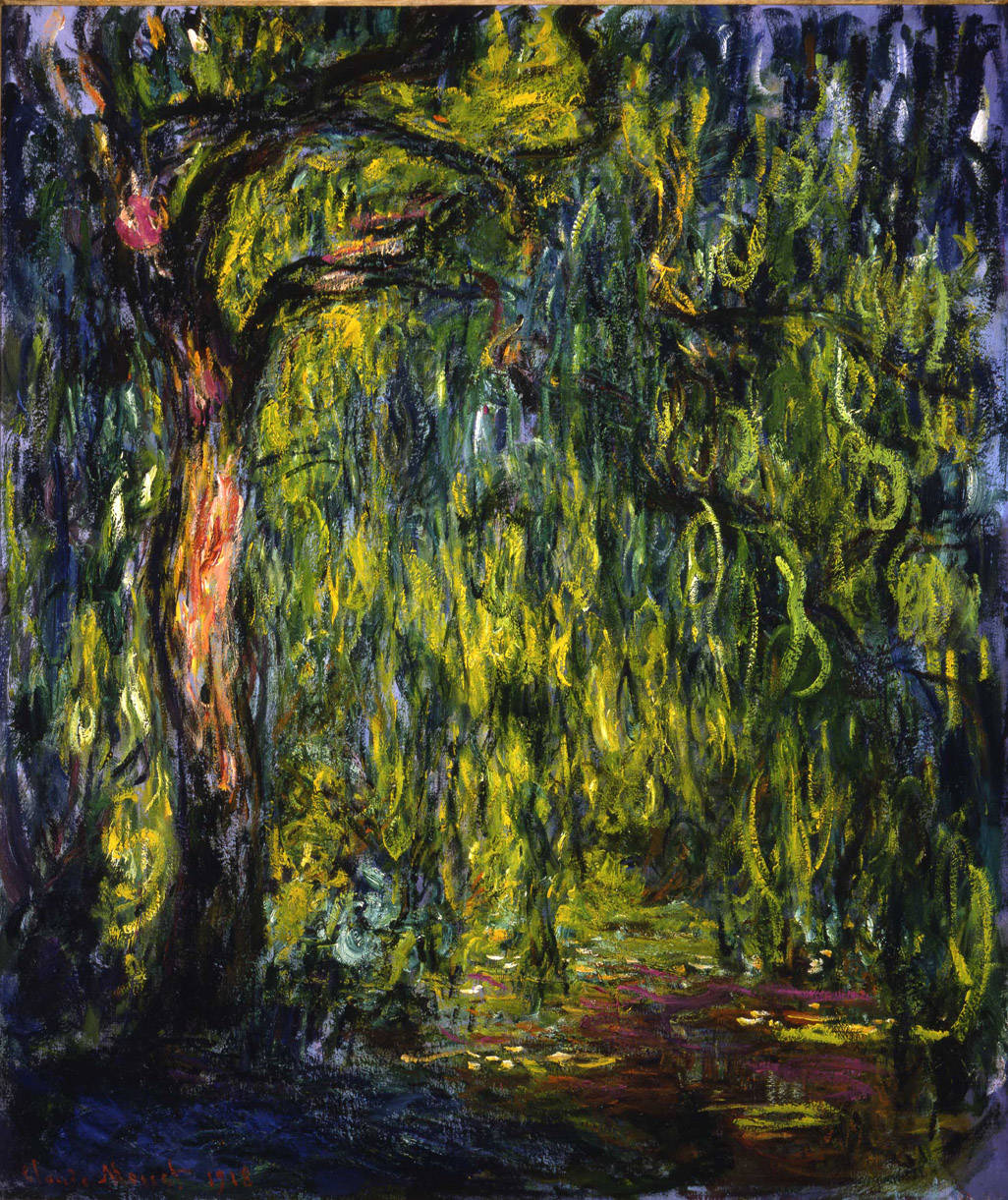
Weeping Willow, 1918, Columbus Museum of Art

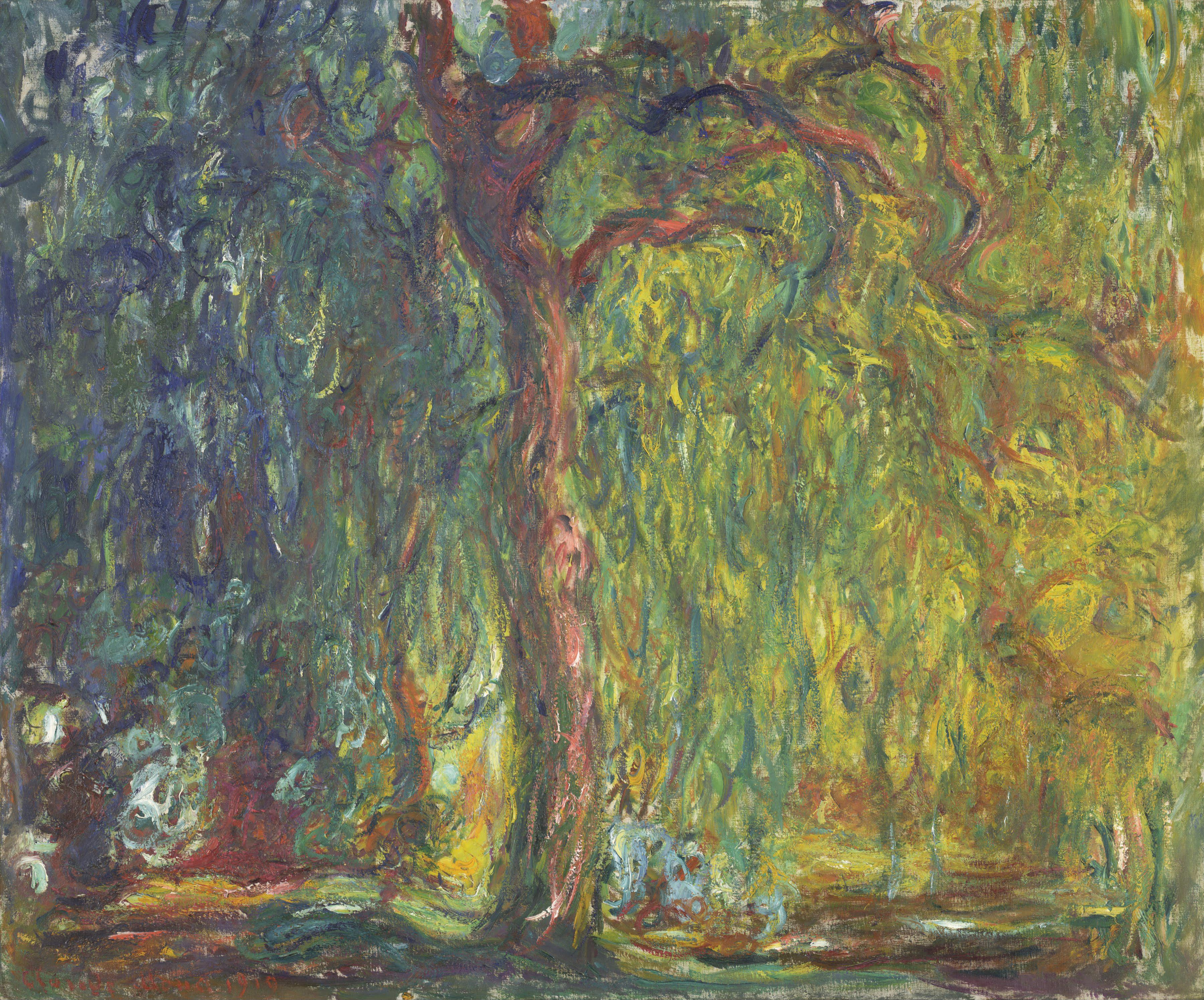
Weeping Willow, 1918–19, Kimball Art Museum, Fort Worth, Monet's Weeping Willow paintings were an homage to the fallen French soldiers of World War I

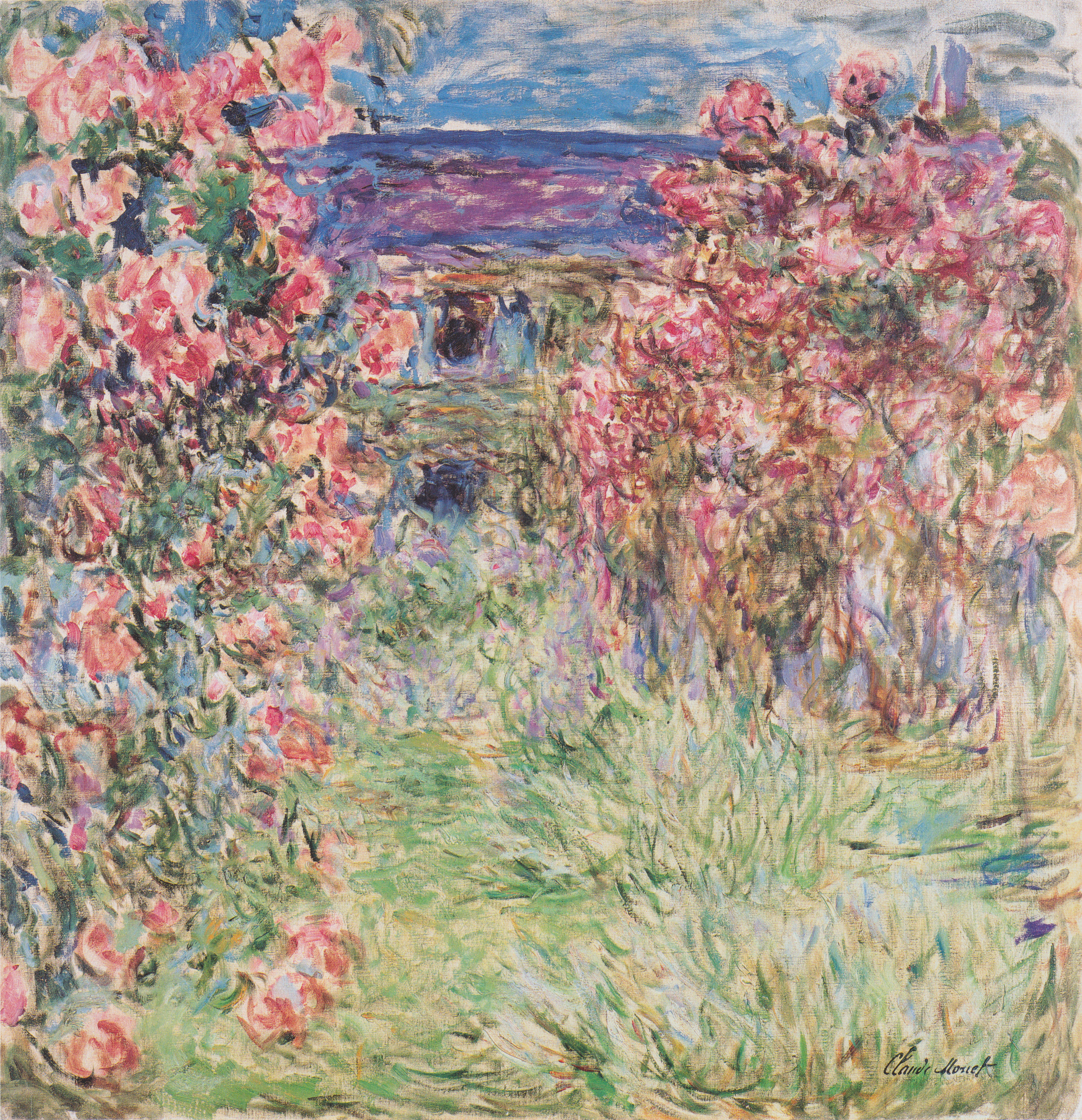
House Among the Roses, between 1917 and 1919, Albertina, Vienna

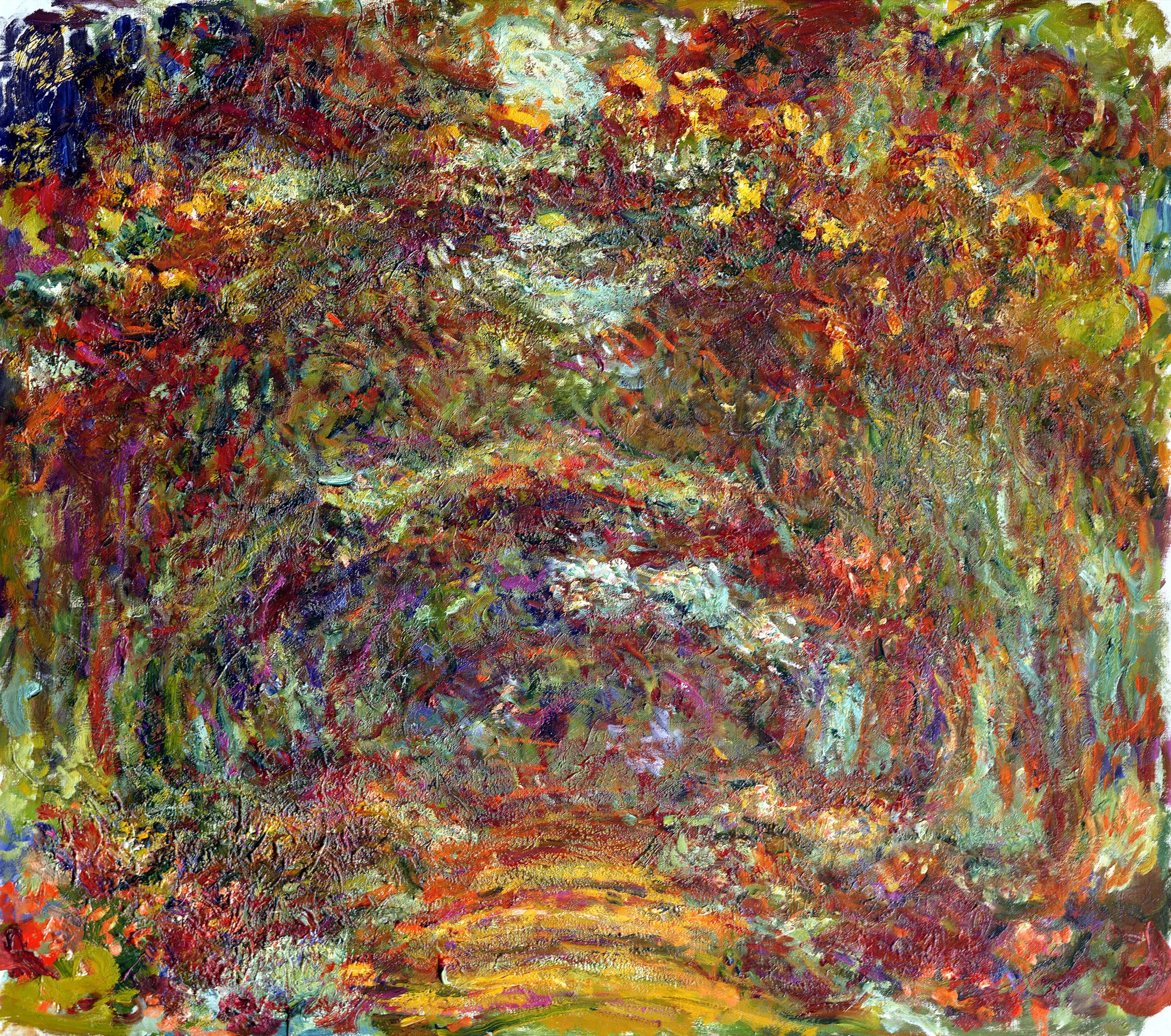
The Rose Walk, Giverny, 1920–1922, Musée Marmottan Monet

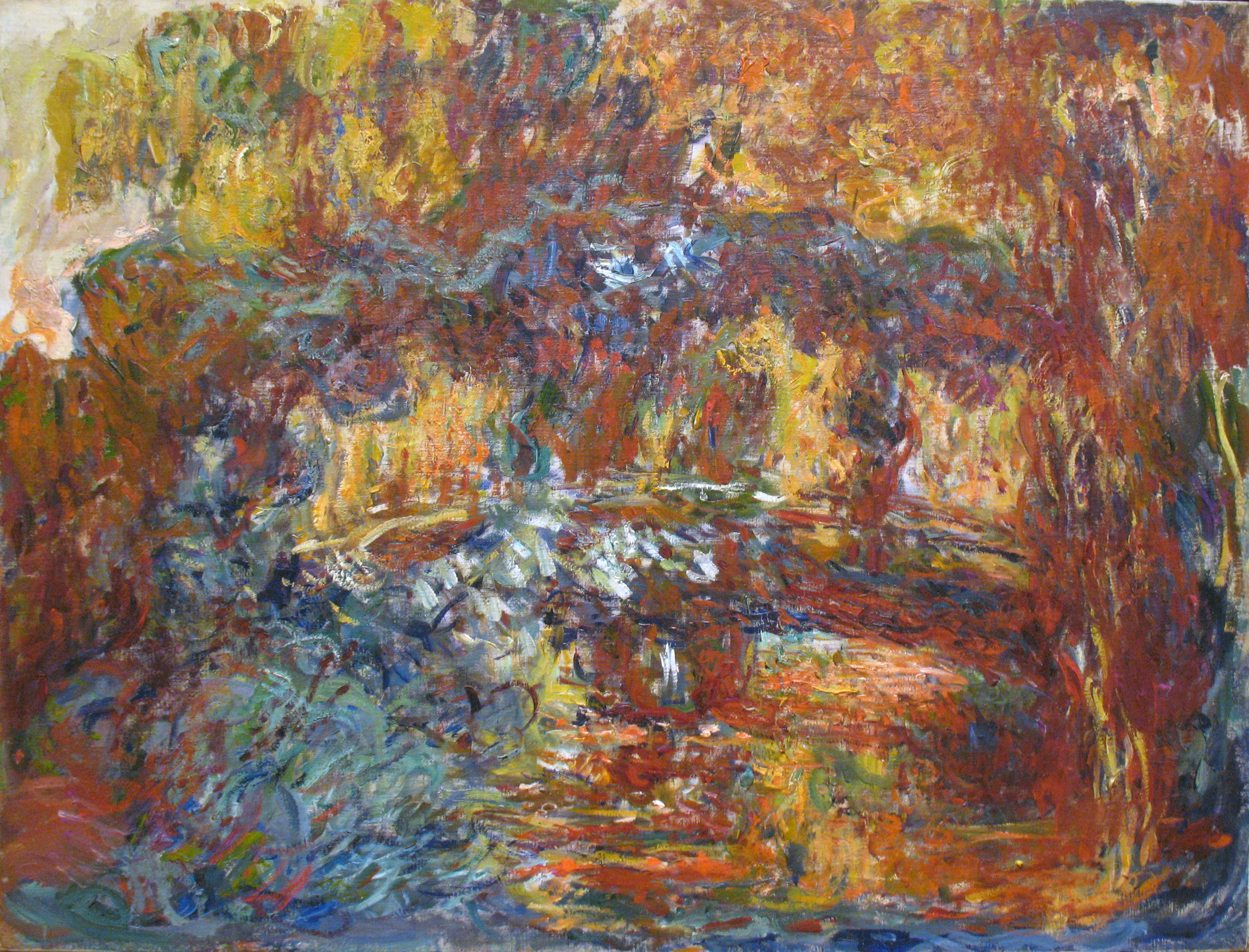
The Japanese Footbridge, 1920–1922, Museum of Modern Art

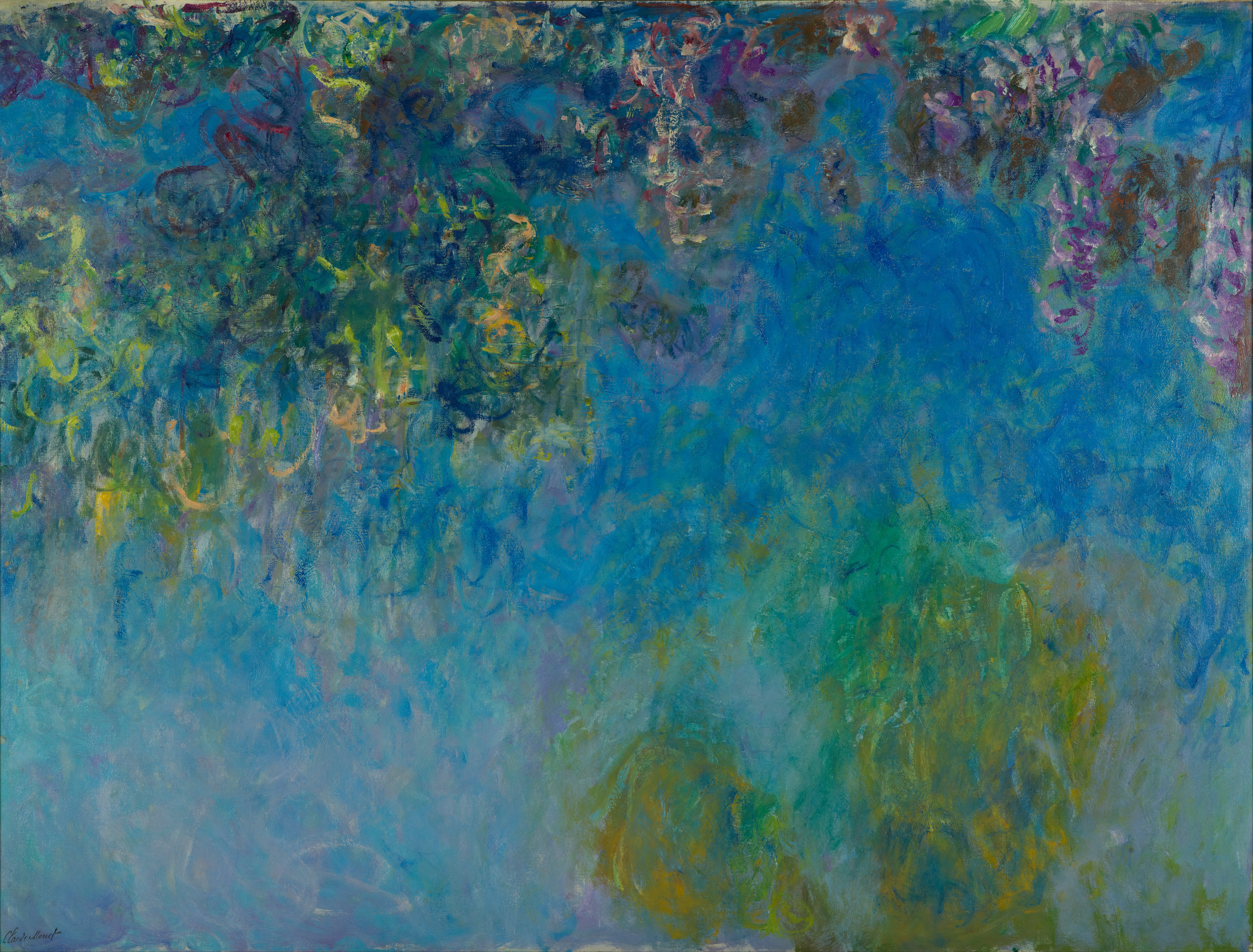
Wisteria, 1920–1925, Kunstmuseum Den Haag

Iris (1925), sale Sotheby's (private collection)

== Method ==
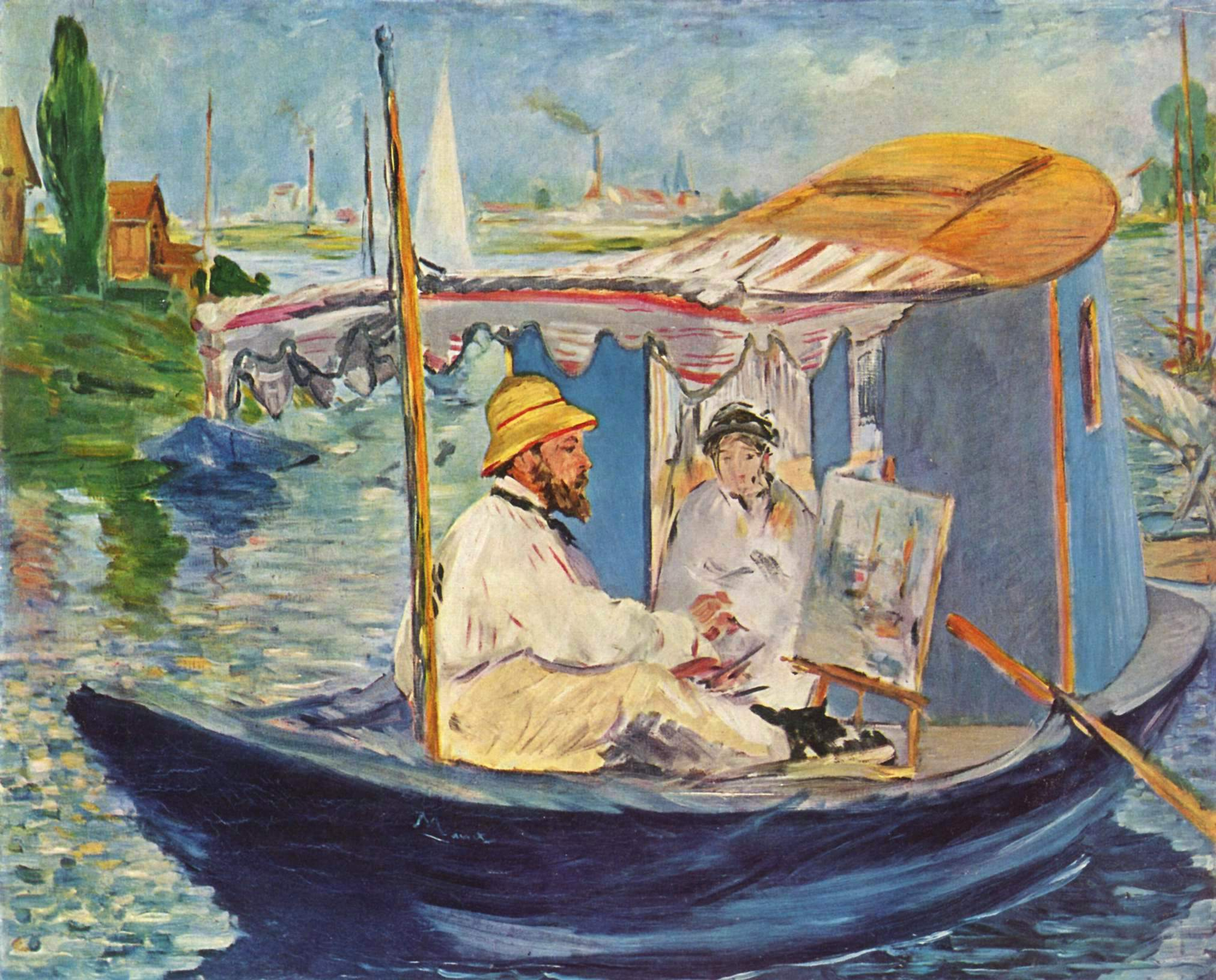
Édouard Manet, Claude Monet in Argenteuil, 1874, Neue Pinakothek

Monet has been described as "the driving force behind Impressionism". Crucial to the art of the Impressionist painters was the understanding of the effects of light on the local colour of objects, and the effects of the juxtaposition of colours with each other. His free flowing style and use of colour have been described as "almost ethereal" and the "[epitome] of impressionist style"; Impression, Sunrise is an example of the "fundamental" Impressionist principle of depicting only that which is purely visible. Monet was fascinated with the effects of light, and painting en plein air—he believed that his only "merit lies in having painted directly in front of nature, seeking to render my impressions of the most fleeting effects" Wanting to "paint the air", he often combined modern life subjects in outdoor light.

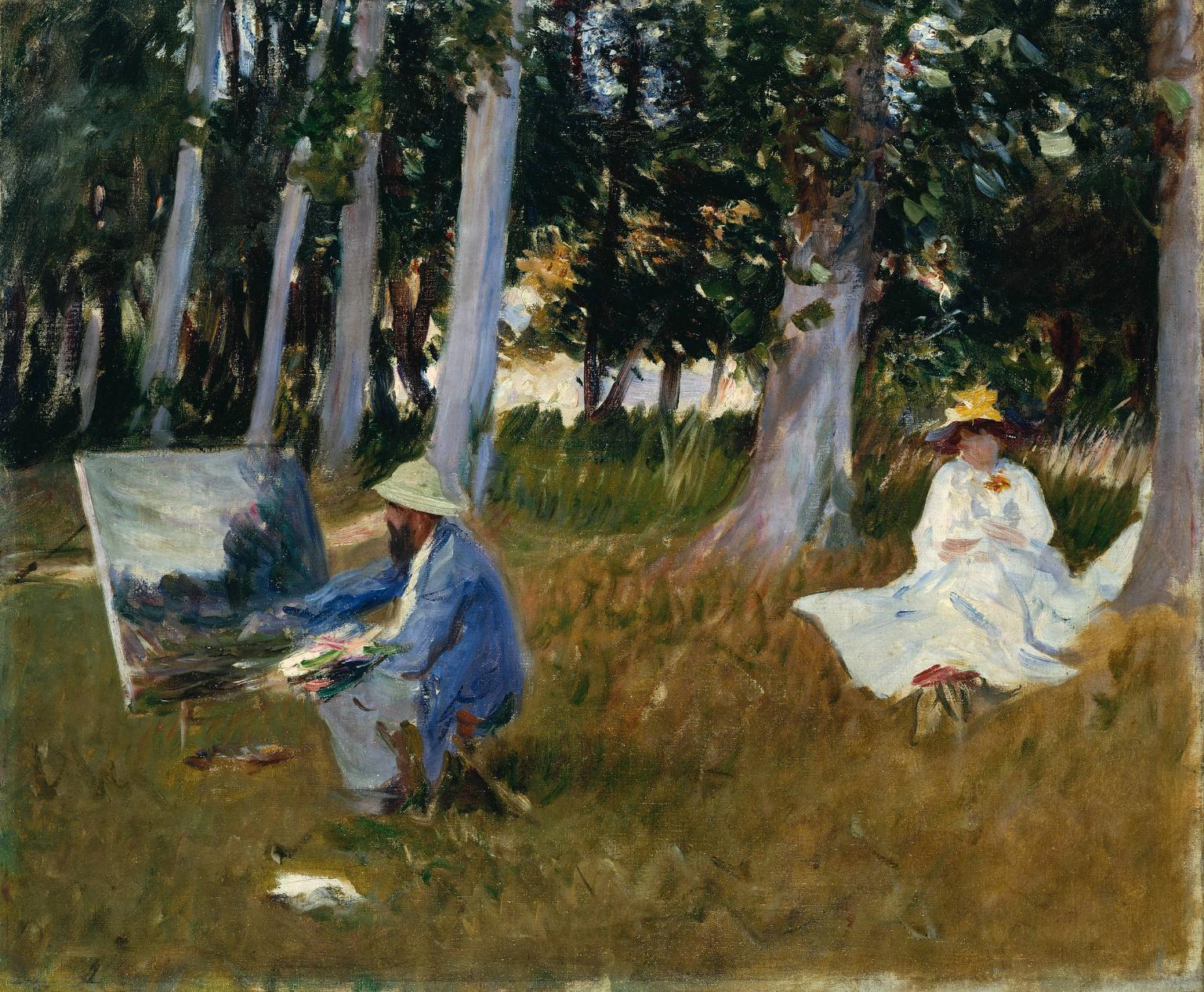
John Singer Sargent, Claude Monet Painting by the Edge of a Wood, 1885, Tate Britain

Monet made light the central focus of his paintings. To capture its variations, he would sometimes complete a painting in one sitting, often without preparation. He wished to demonstrate how light altered colour and perception of reality. His interest in light and reflection began in the late 1860s and lasted throughout his career. During his first time in London, he developed an admiration for the relationship between the artist and motifs—for what he deemed the "envelope". He utilised pencil drawings to quickly note subjects and motifs for future reference.

Monet's portrayal of landscapes emphasised industrial elements such as railways and factories; his early seascapes featured brooding nature depicted with muted colours and local residents. Critic, and friend of Monet, Théodore Duret noted, in 1874, that he was "little attracted by rustic scenes...He [felt] particularly drawn towards nature when it is embellished and towards urban scenes and for preference he paint[ed] flowery gardens, parks and groves." When depicting figures and landscapes in tandem, Monet wished for the landscape to not be a mere backdrop and the figures not to dominate the composition. His dedication to such a portrayal of landscapes resulted in Monet reprimanding Renoir for defying it. He often depicted the suburban and rural leisure activities of Paris and as a young artist experimented with still lifes. From the 1870s onwards, he gradually moved away from suburban and urban landscapes—when they were depicted it was to further his study of light. Contemporary critics—and later academics—felt that with his choice of showcasing Belle Île, he had indicated a desire to move away from the modern culture of Impressionist paintings and instead towards primitive nature.

After meeting Boudin, Monet dedicated himself to searching for new and improved methods of painterly expression. To this end, as a young man, he visited the Salon and familiarised himself with the works of older painters, and made friends with other young artists. The five years that he spent at Argenteuil, spending much time on the River Seine in a little floating studio, were formative in his study of the effects of light and reflections. He began to think in terms of colours and shapes rather than scenes and objects. He used bright colours in dabs and dashes and squiggles of paint. Having rejected the academic teachings of Gleyre's studio, he freed himself from theory, saying "I like to paint as a bird sings". Boudin, Daubigny, Jongkind, Courbet, and Corot were among Monet's influences and he would often work in accordance with developments in avant-garde art.

In 1877 a series of paintings at St-Lazare Station had Monet looking at smoke and steam and the way that they affected colour and visibility, being sometimes opaque and sometimes translucent. He was to further use this study in the painting of the effects of mist and rain on the landscape. The study of the effects of atmosphere was to evolve into a number of series of paintings in which Monet repeatedly painted the same subject (such as his water lilies series) in different lights, at different hours of the day, and through the changes of weather and season. This process began in the 1880s and continued until the end of his life in 1926. In his later career, Monet "transcended" the Impressionist style and begun to push the boundaries of art.

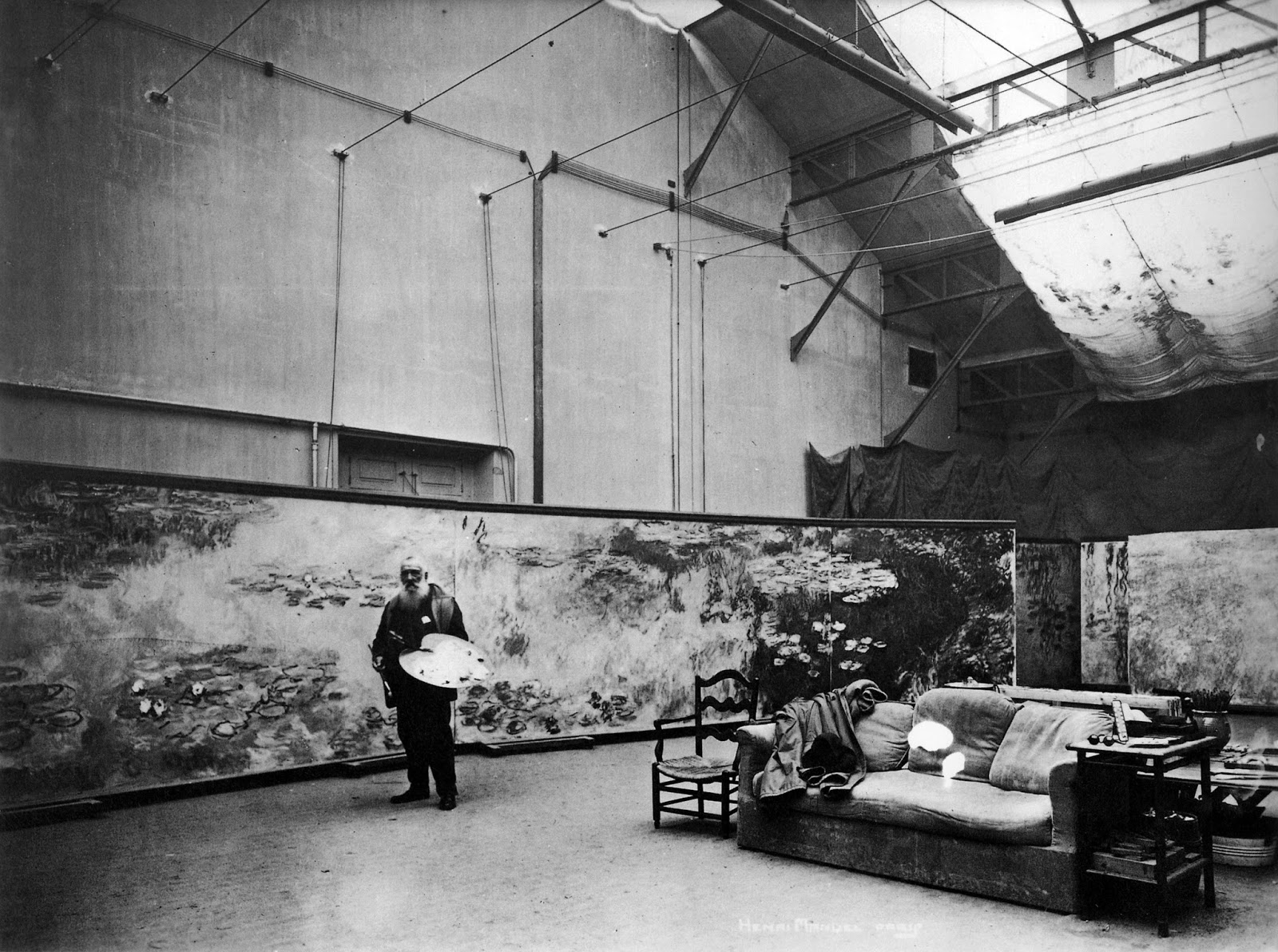
Monet in his studio, c. 1920

Monet refined his palette in the 1870s, consciously minimising the use of darker tones and favouring pastel colours. This coincided with his softer approach, using smaller and more varied brush strokes. His palette would again undergo change in the 1880s, with more emphasis than before on harmony between warm and cold hues. Following his optical operation in 1923, Monet returned to his style from before a decade ago. He forwent garish colours or "coarse application" for emphasised colour schemes of blue and green. Whilst suffering from cataracts, his paintings were more broad and abstract—from the late 1880s onwards, he had simplified his compositions and sought subjects that could offer broad colour and tone. He increasingly used red and yellow tones, a trend that first started following his trip to Venice. Monet often travelled alone at this time—from France to Normandy to London; to the Rivera and Rouen—in search of new and more challenging subjects.

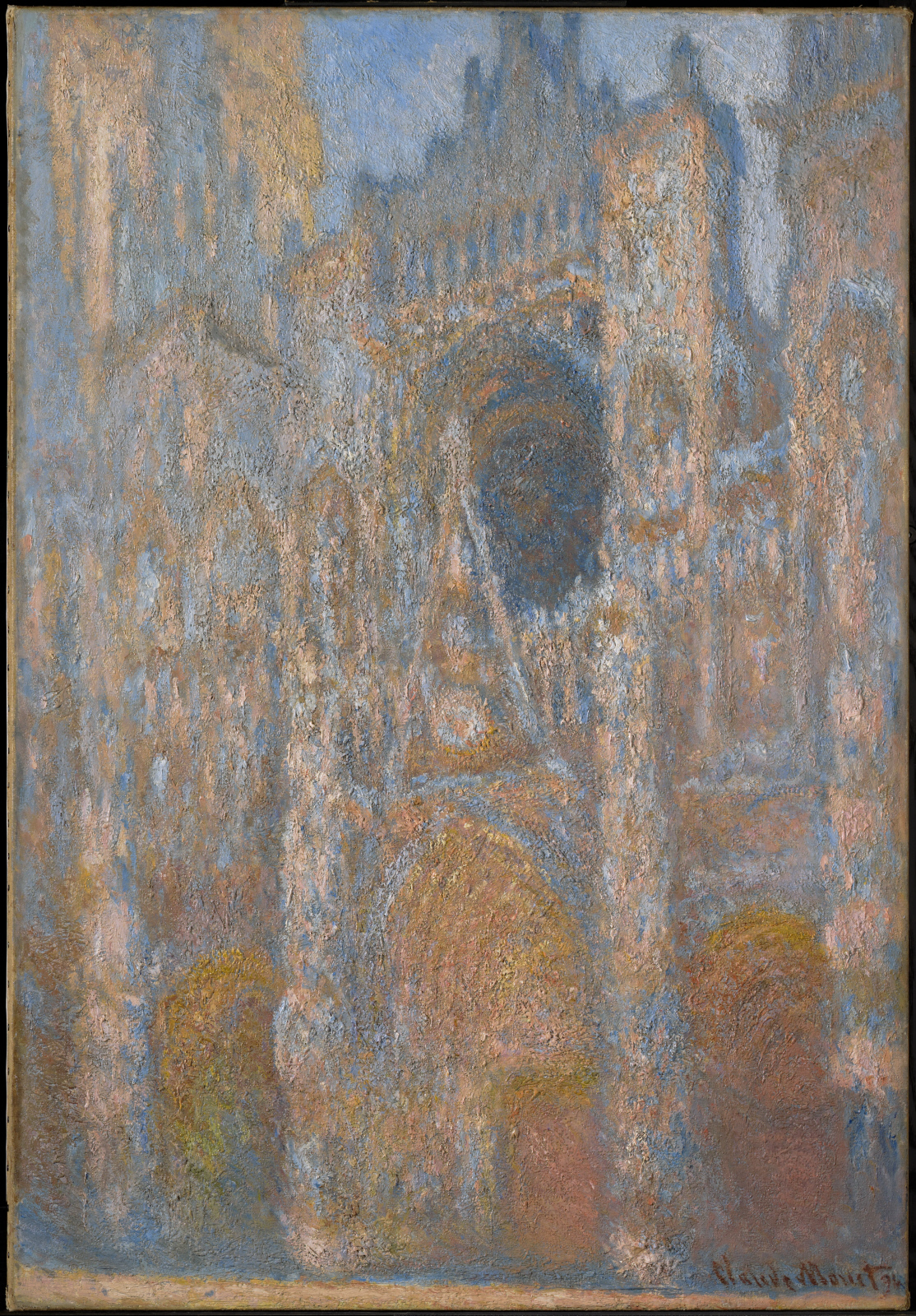
Rouen Cathedral, the Façade in Sunlight, c. 1892–94, Clark Art Institute, Williamstown, Massachusetts

The stylistic change was likely a by-product of the disorder and not an intentional choice. Monet would often work on large canvases due to the deterioration of his eyesight and by 1920 he admitted that he had grown too accustomed to broad painting to return to small canvases. The influence of his cataracts on his output has been a topic of discussion among academics; Lane et al. (1997) argues the occurrence of a deterioration from the late 1860s onwards led to a diminishing of sharp lines. Gardens were a focus throughout his art, becoming prominent in his later work, especially during the last decade of his life. Daniel Wildenstein noted a "seamless" continuity in his paintings that was "enriched by innovation".

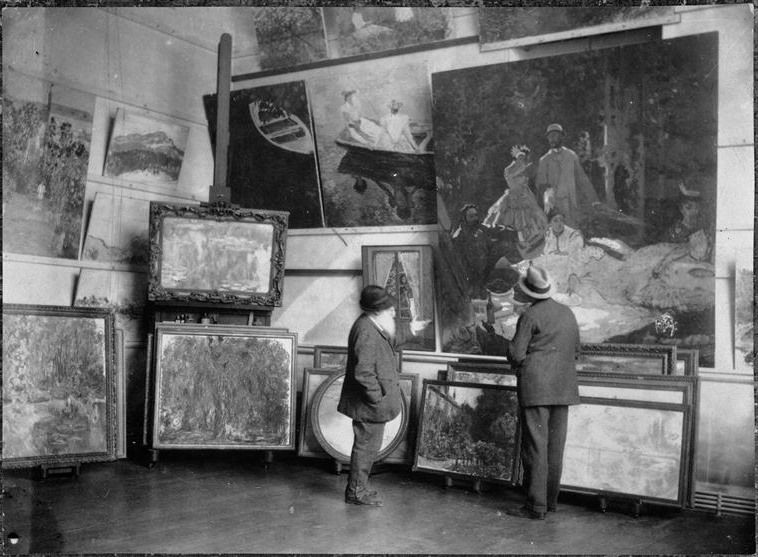
Monet in his studio, c. 1920

From the 1880s onwards—and particularly in the 1890s—Monet's series of paintings of specific subjects sought to document the different conditions of light and weather. As light and weather changed throughout the day, he switched between canvases—sometimes working on as many as eight at one time—usually spending an hour on each. In 1895, he exhibited 20 paintings of Rouen Cathedral, showcasing the façade in different conditions of light, weather and atmosphere. The paintings do not focus on the grand Medieval building, but on the play of light and shade across its surface, transforming the solid masonry. For this series, he experimented with creating his own frames.

His first series exhibited was of haystacks, painted from different points of view and at different times of the day. Fifteen of the paintings were exhibited at the Galerie Durand-Ruel in 1891. In 1892 he produced twenty-six views of Rouen Cathedral. Between 1883 and 1908, Monet travelled to the Mediterranean, where he painted landmarks, landscapes, and seascapes, including a series of paintings in Venice. In 1915, he exhibited works with Durand-Ruel at the Panama–Pacific International Exposition in San Francisco, although he did not visit the United States in his lifetime. In London he painted four series: the Houses of Parliament, London, Charing Cross Bridge, Waterloo Bridge, and Views of Westminster Bridge. Helen Gardner writes:

Monet, with a scientific precision, has given us an unparalleled and unexcelled record of the passing of time as seen in the movement of light over identical forms.

Series of paintings

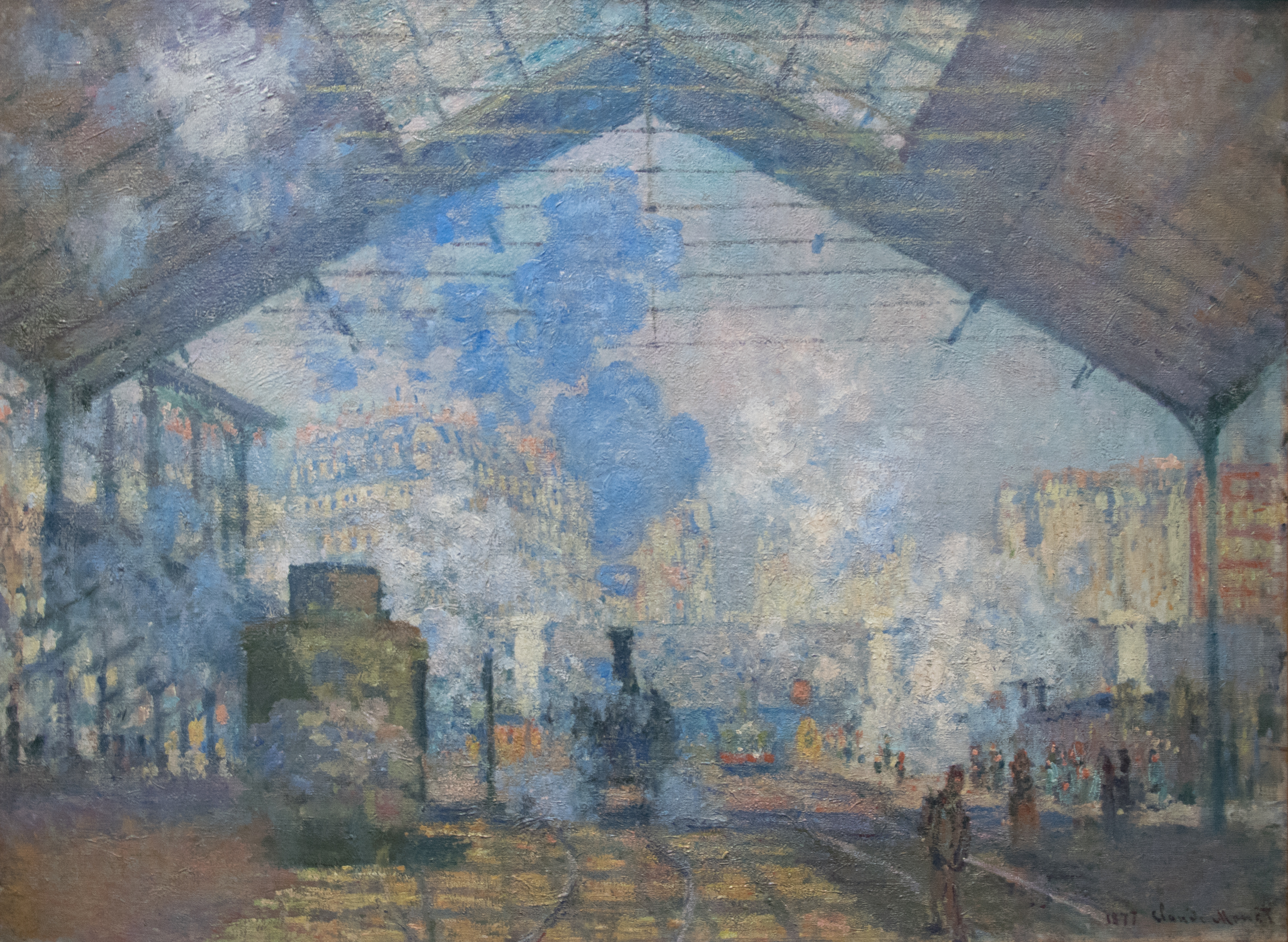
La Gare Saint-Lazare, 1877, Musée d'Orsay

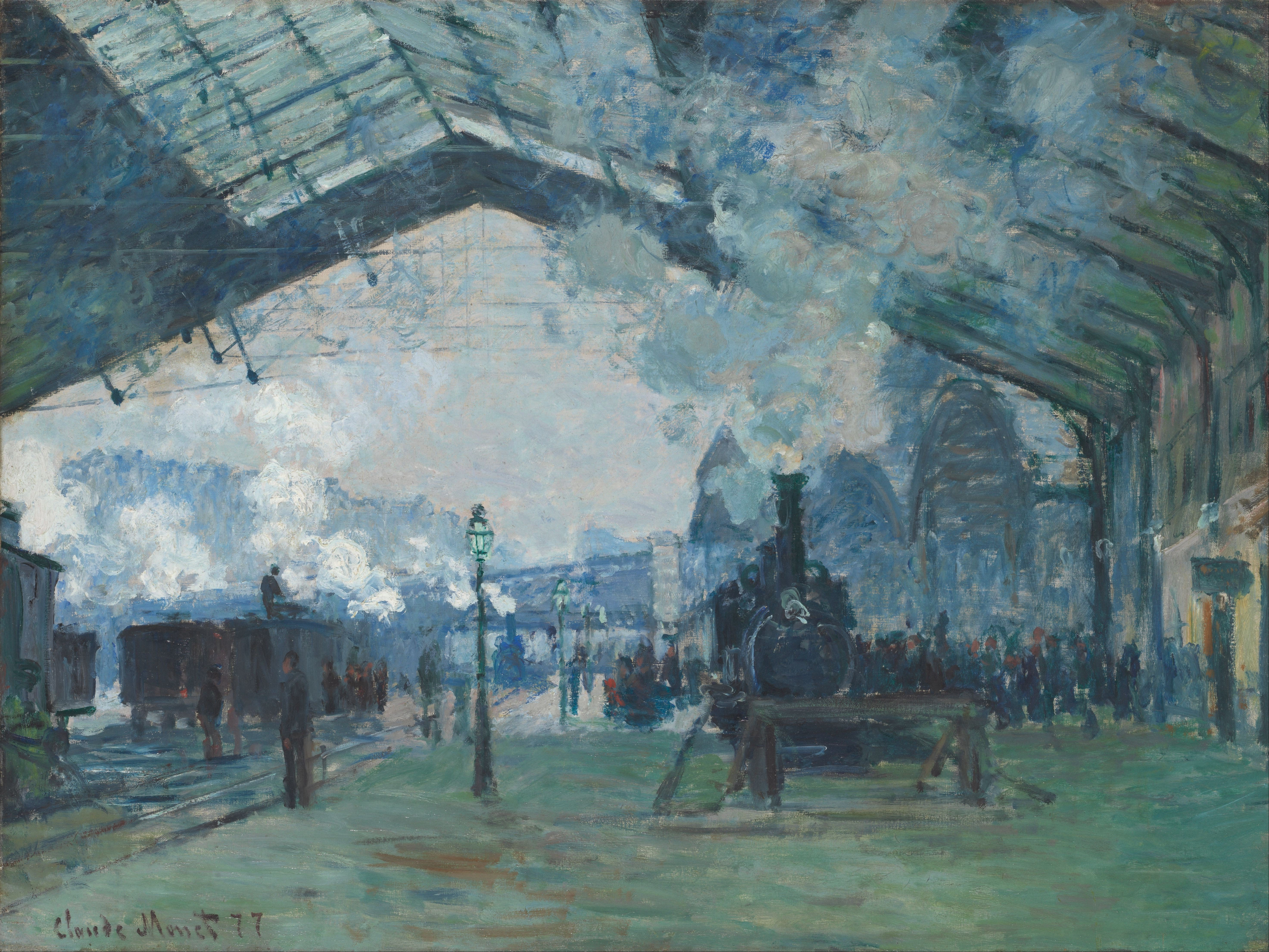
Arrival of the Normandy Train, Gare Saint-Lazare, 1877, The Art Institute of Chicago, a part of Monet's Gare Saint-Lazare series.

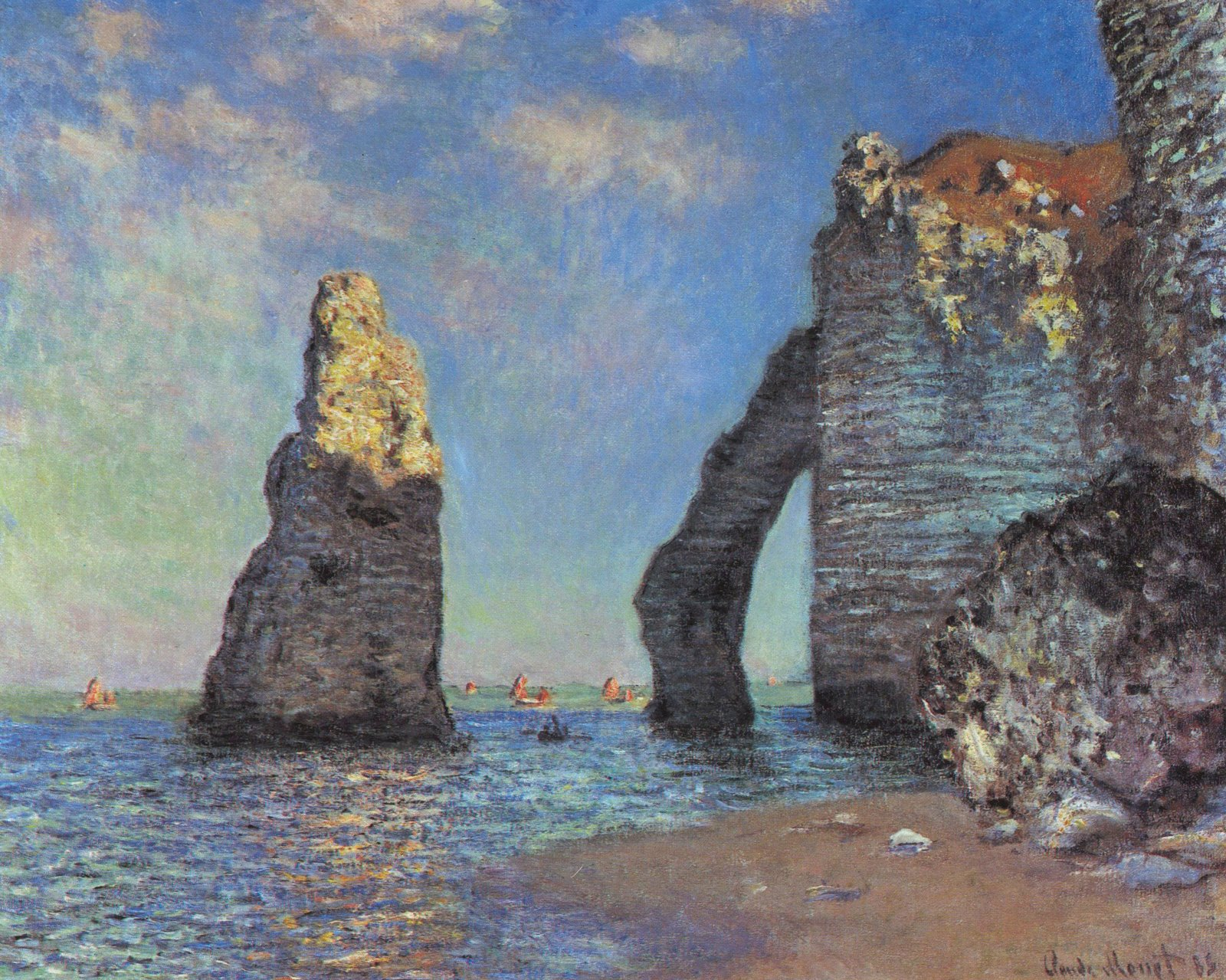
The Cliffs at Etretat, 1885, Clark Art Institute

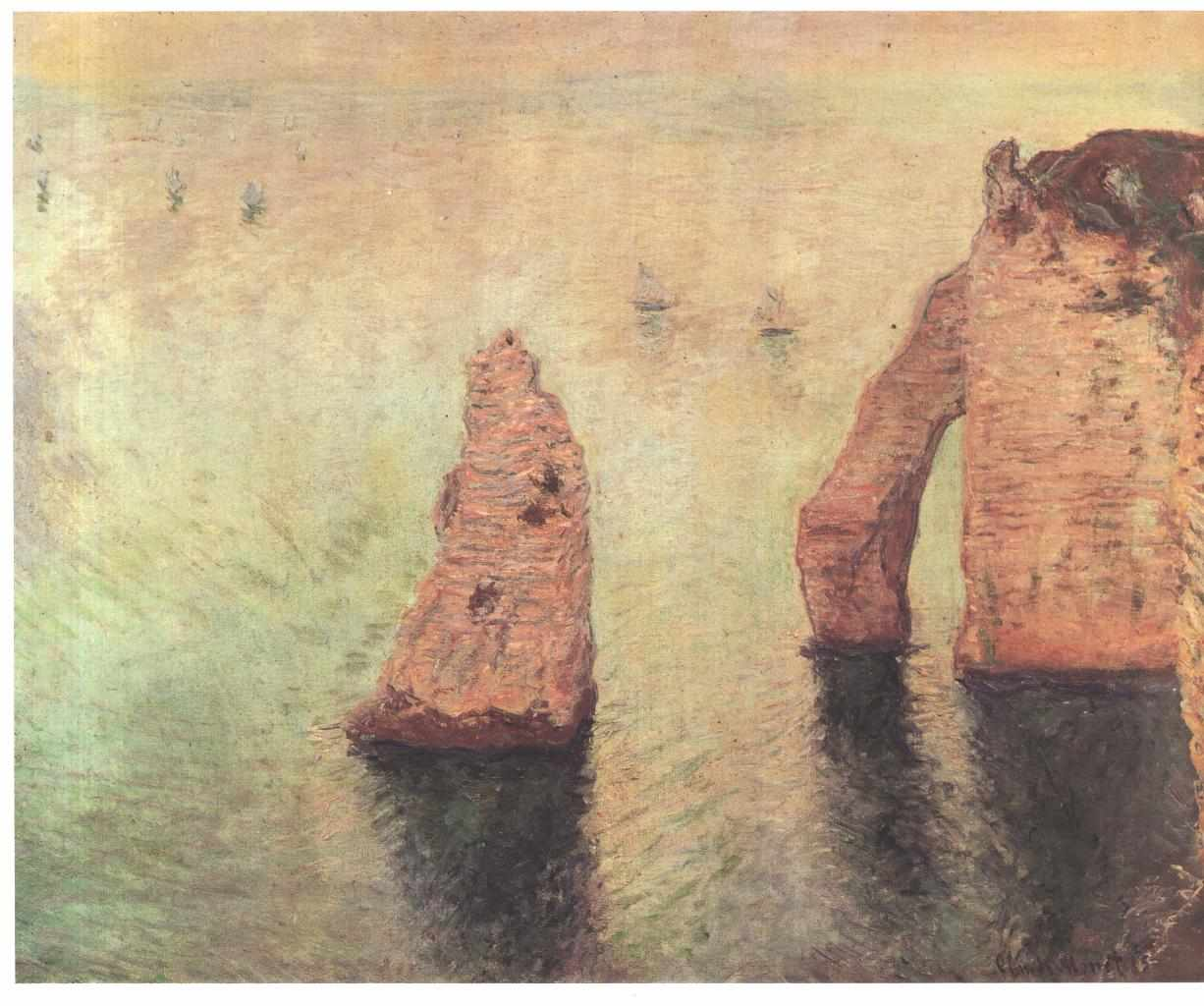
Sailboats behind the needle at Etretat, 1885

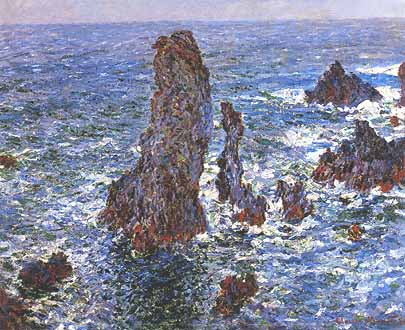
The Pyramides at Port-Coton, Rough Sea, 1886, Pushkin Museum, Moscow

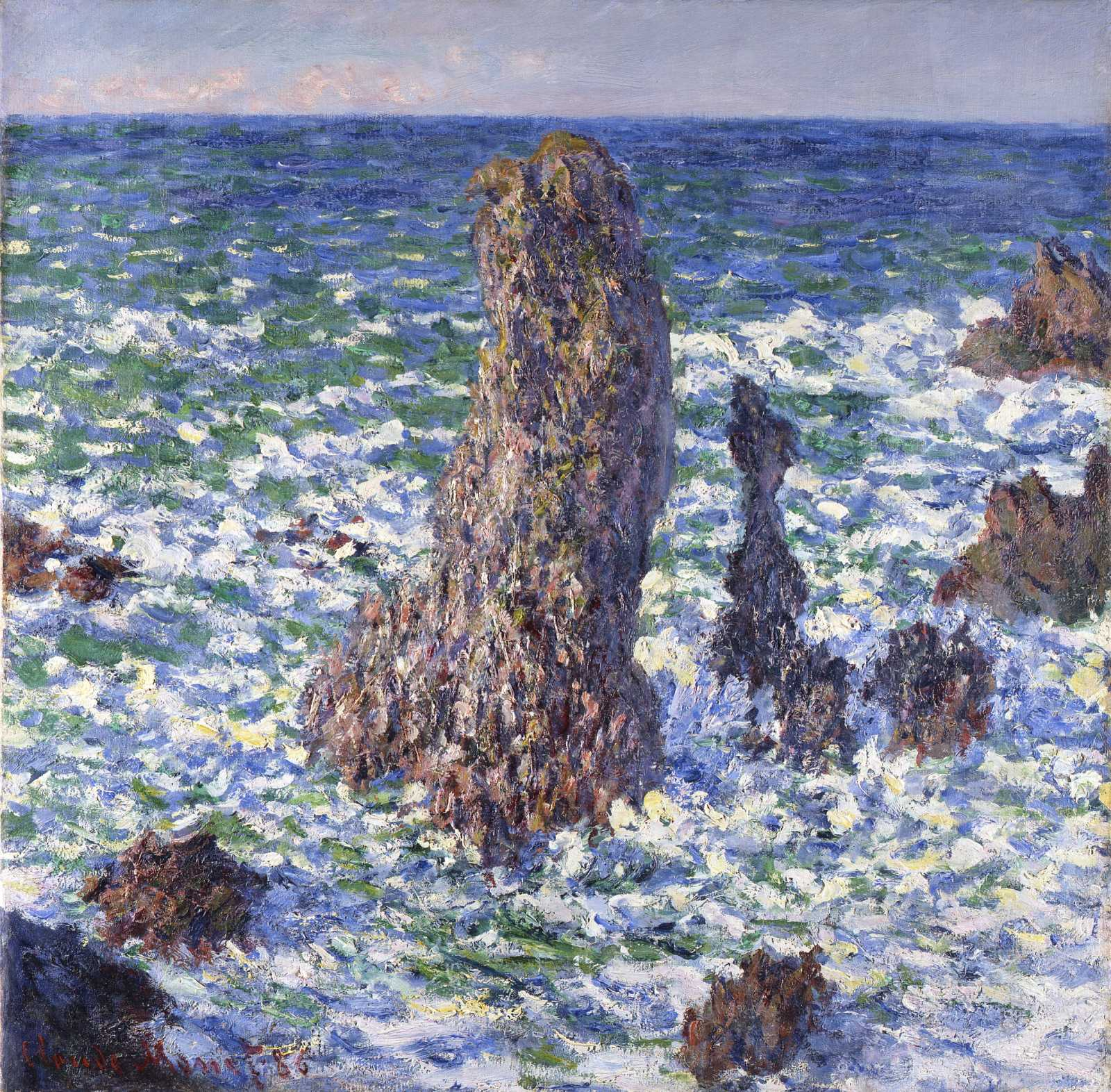
The Pyramides at Port-Coton, Sun Effect, 1886, Private collection

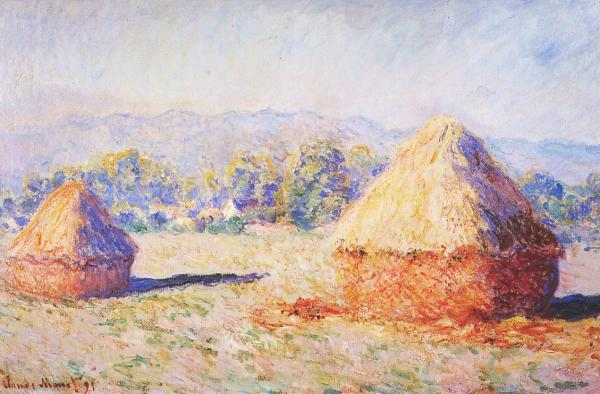
Two paintings from a series of grainstacks, 1890–91: Grainstacks in the Sunlight, Morning Effect

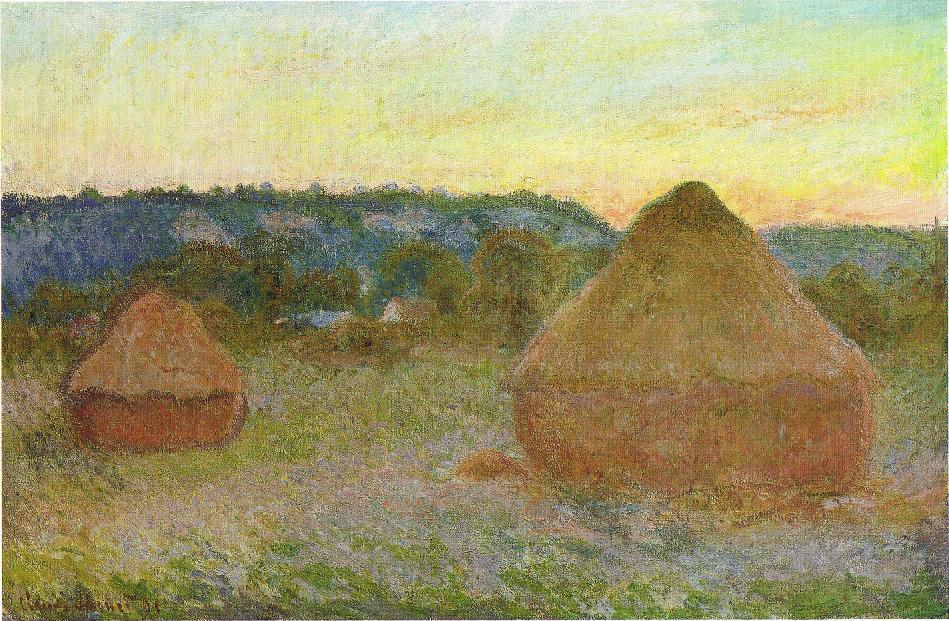
Grainstacks, end of day, Autumn, 1890–1891, Art Institute of Chicago

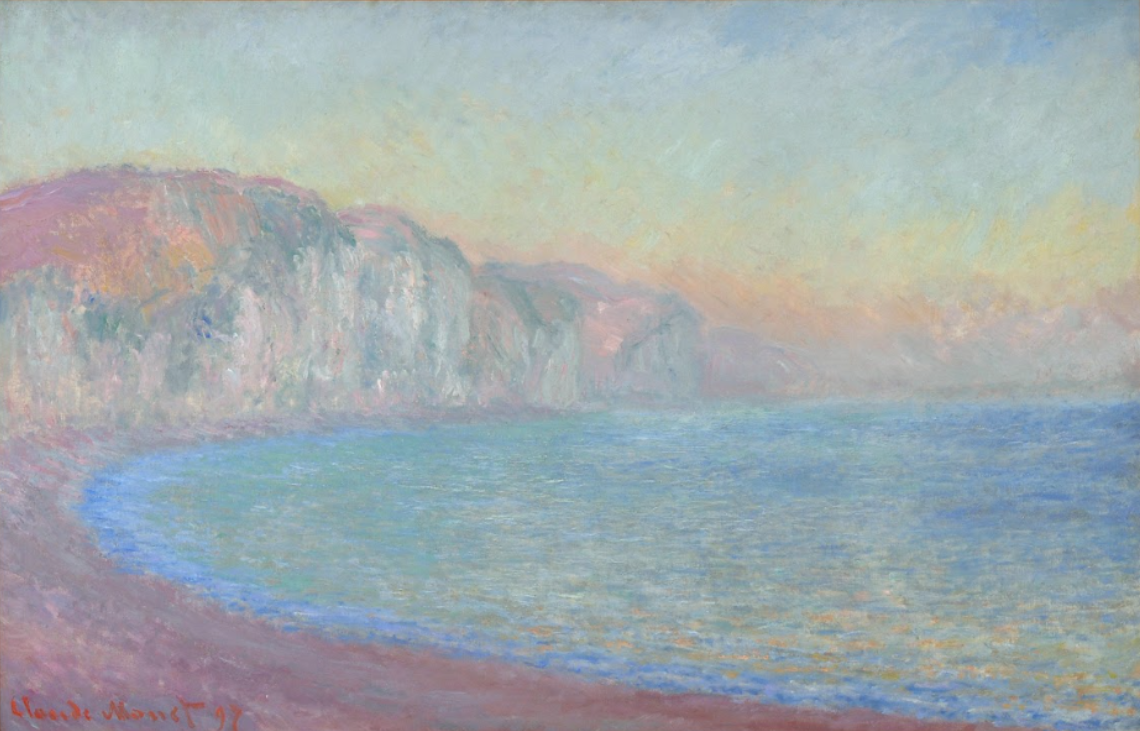
Falaise a Pourville soleil levant, 1897, Magnani-Rocca Foundation

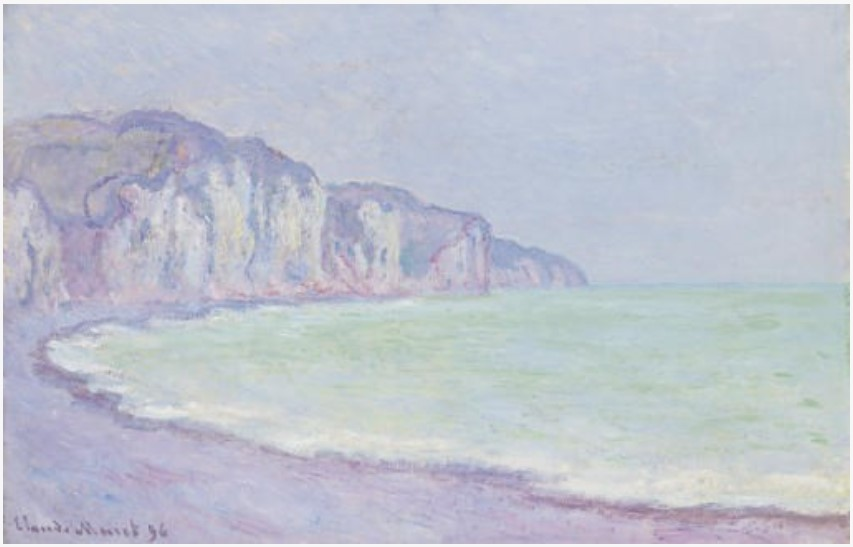
Falaise a Pourville soleil levant, 1897, private collection

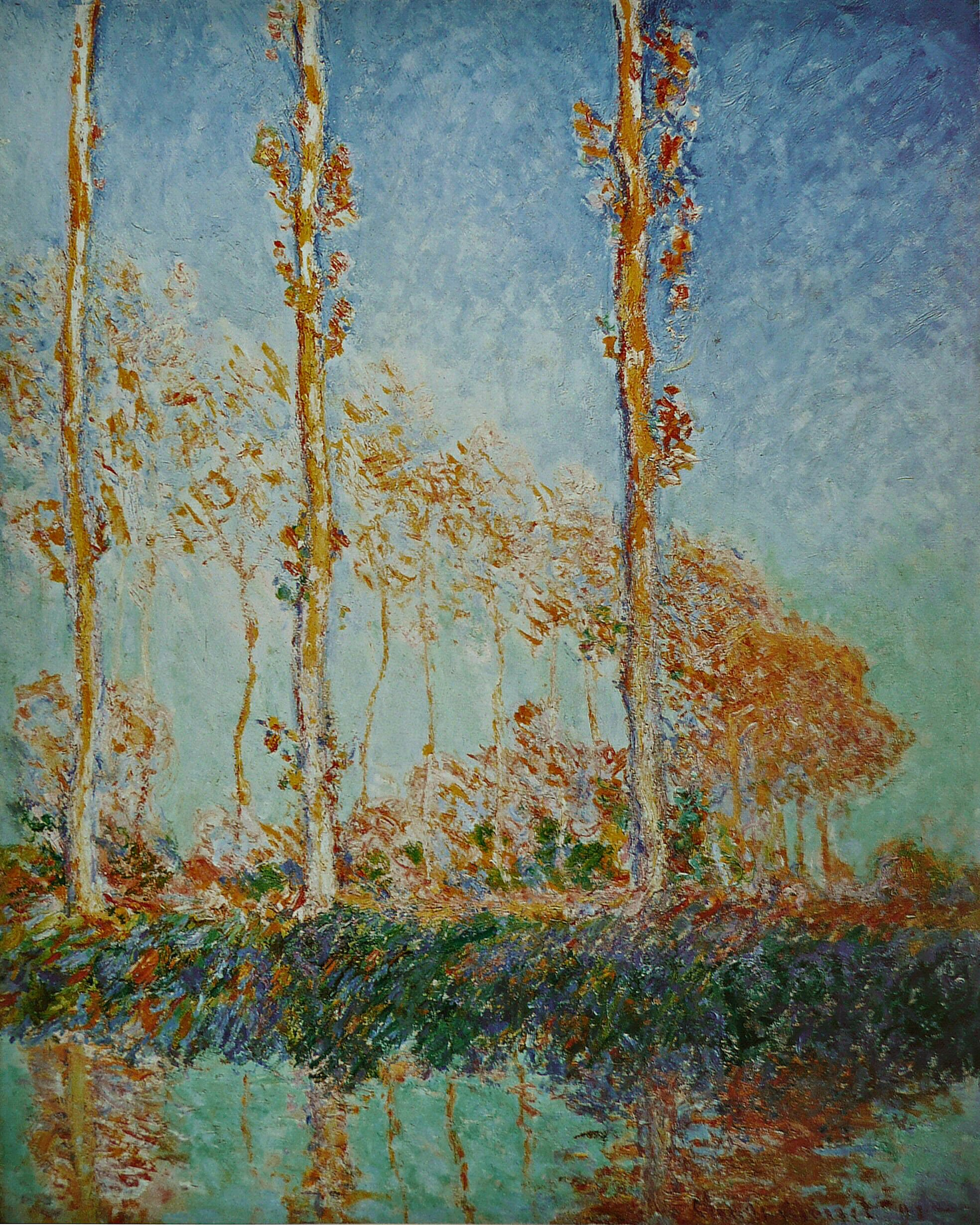
Poplars (Autumn), 1891, Philadelphia Museum of Art

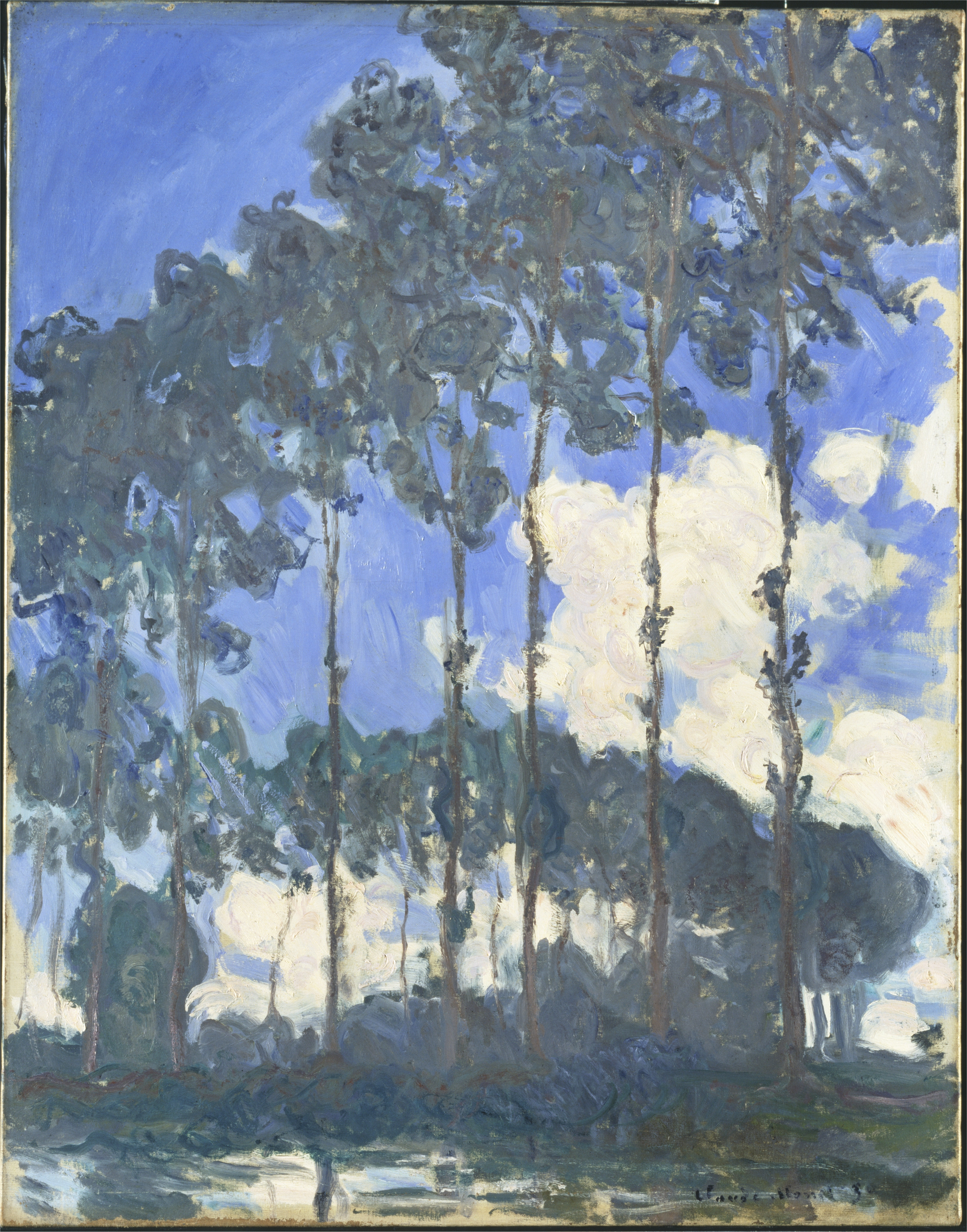
Poplars at the River Epte, 1891 Tate, London

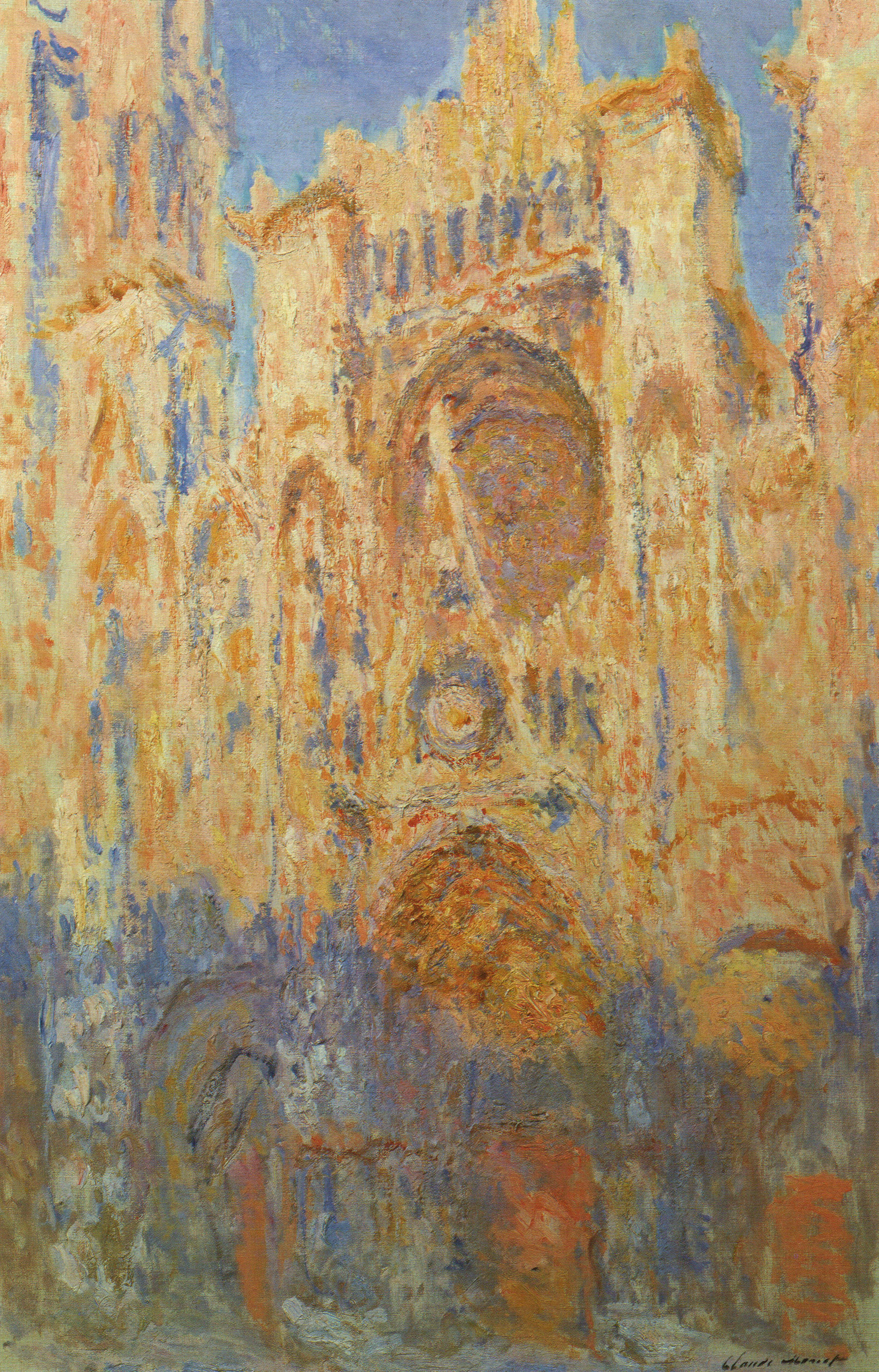
Rouen Cathedral at sunset, 1893, Musée Marmottan Monet

Rouen Cathedral, Morning Light, 1894, J. Paul Getty Museum

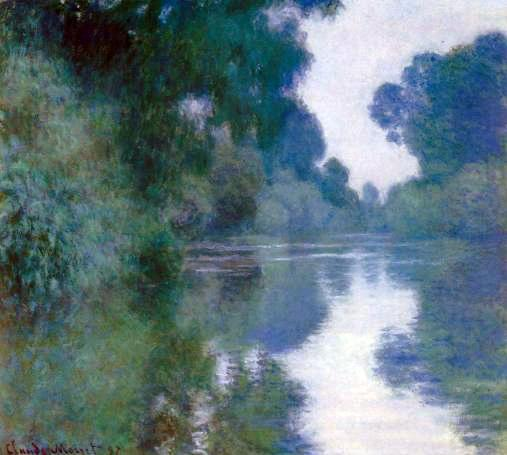
The Seine Near Giverny, 1897, Museum of Fine Arts, Boston

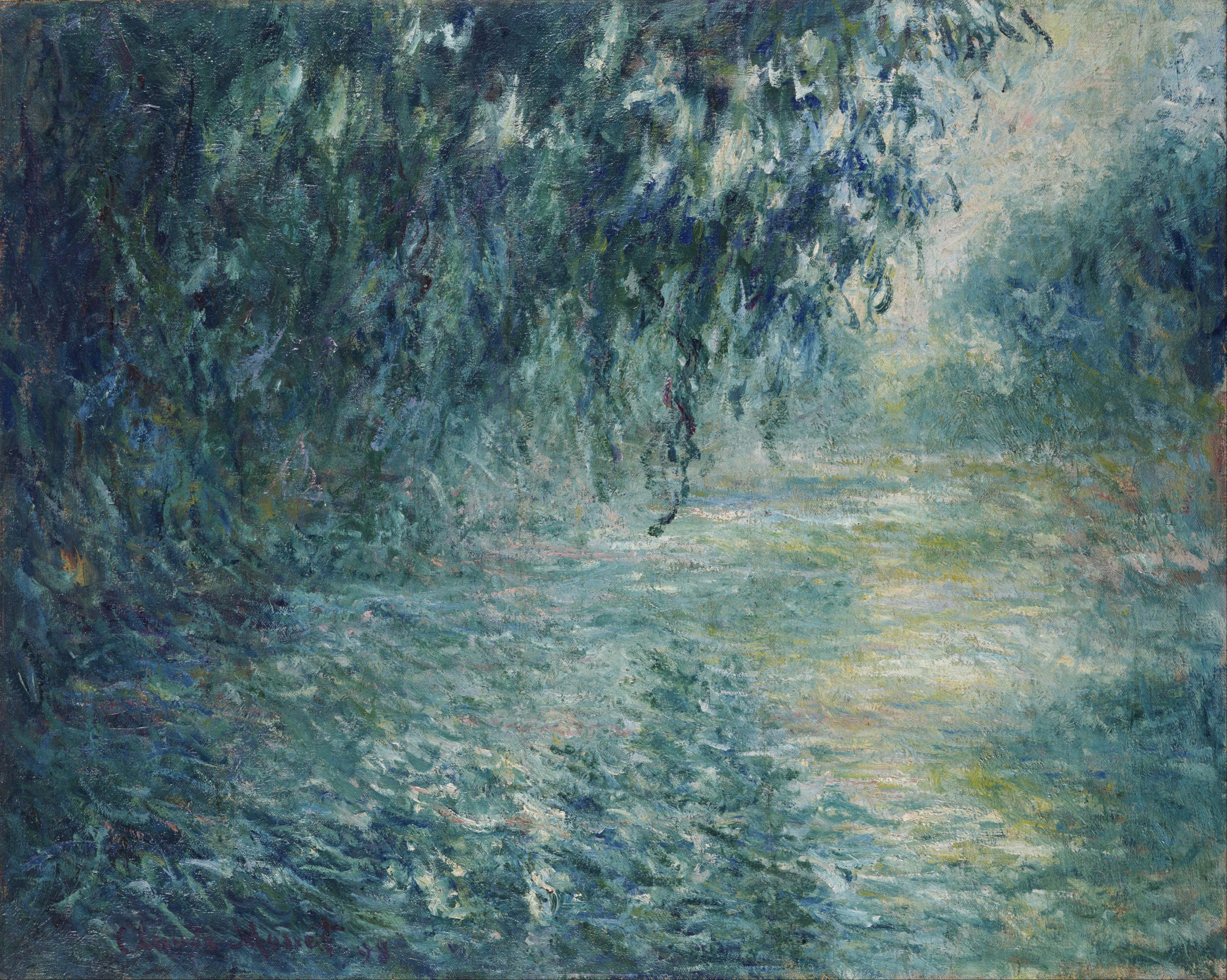
Morning on the Seine, 1898, National Museum of Western Art, Tokyo

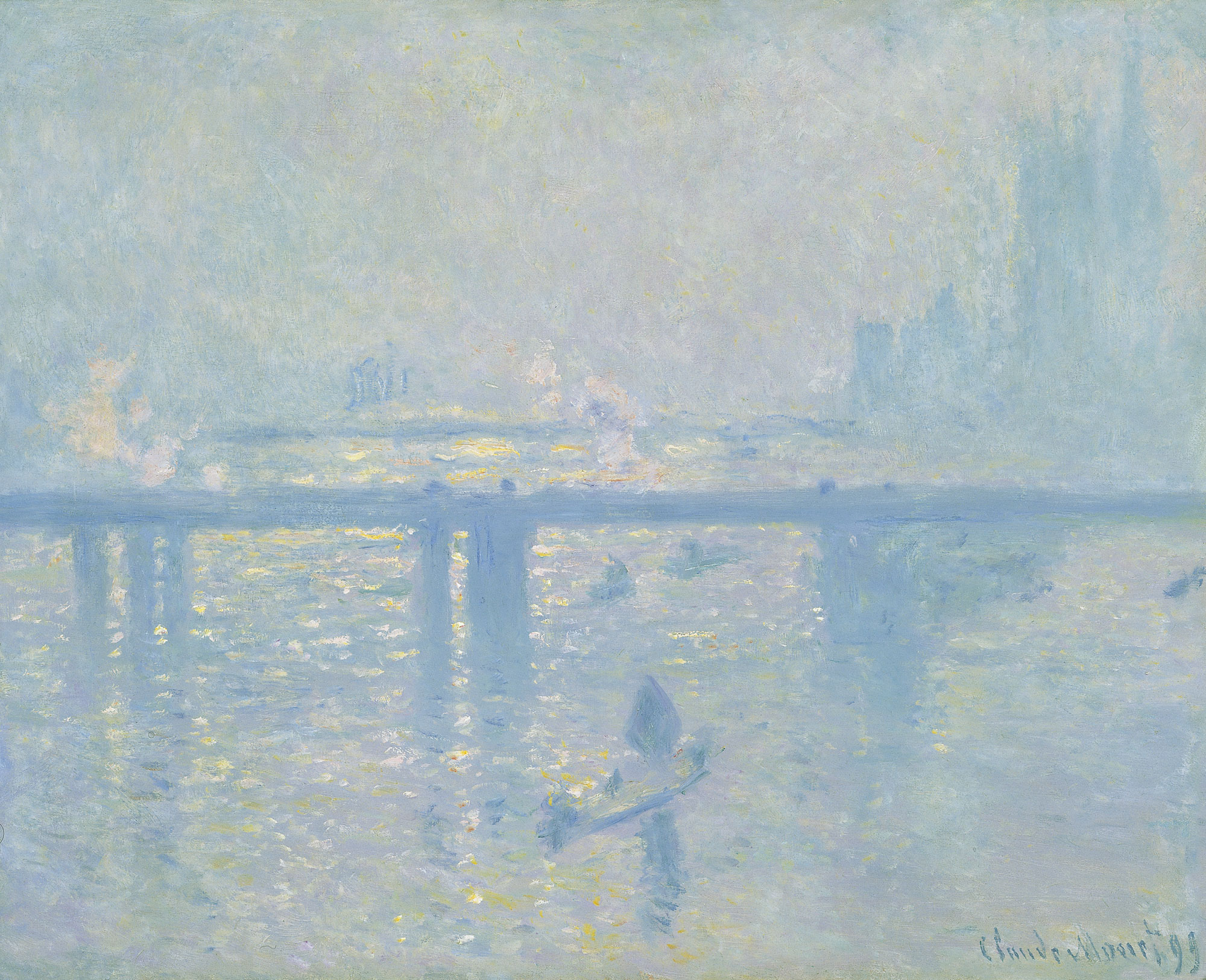
Charing Cross Bridge, 1899, Thyssen-Bornemisza Museum, Madrid

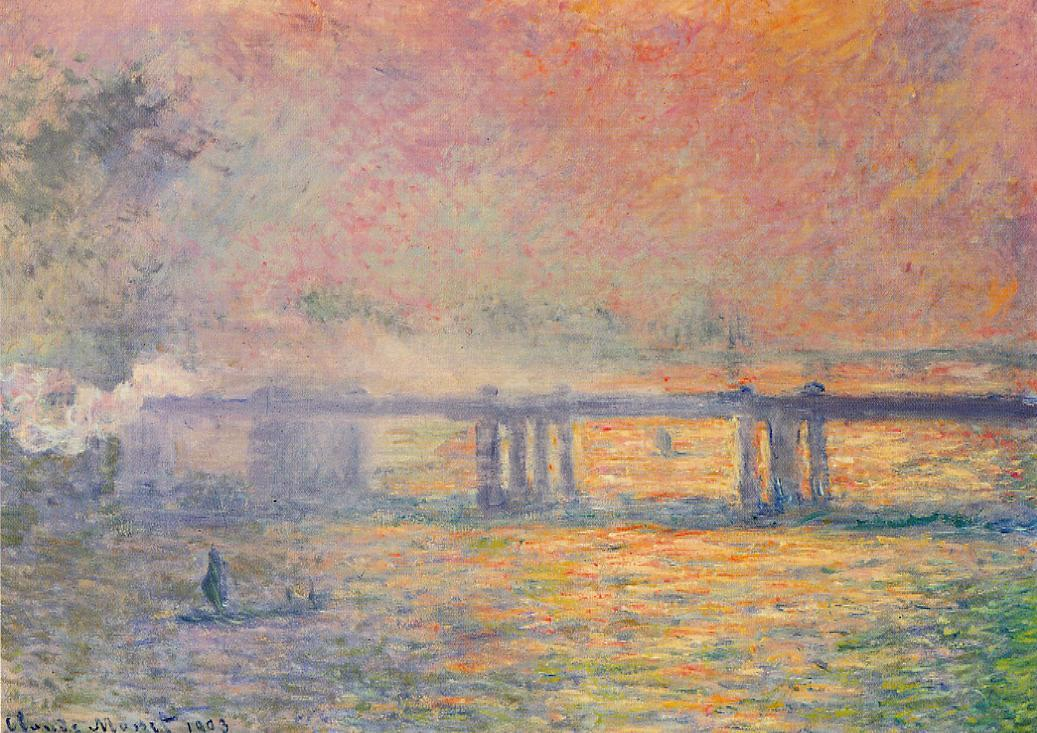
Charing Cross Bridge, London, 1899–1901, Saint Louis Art Museum

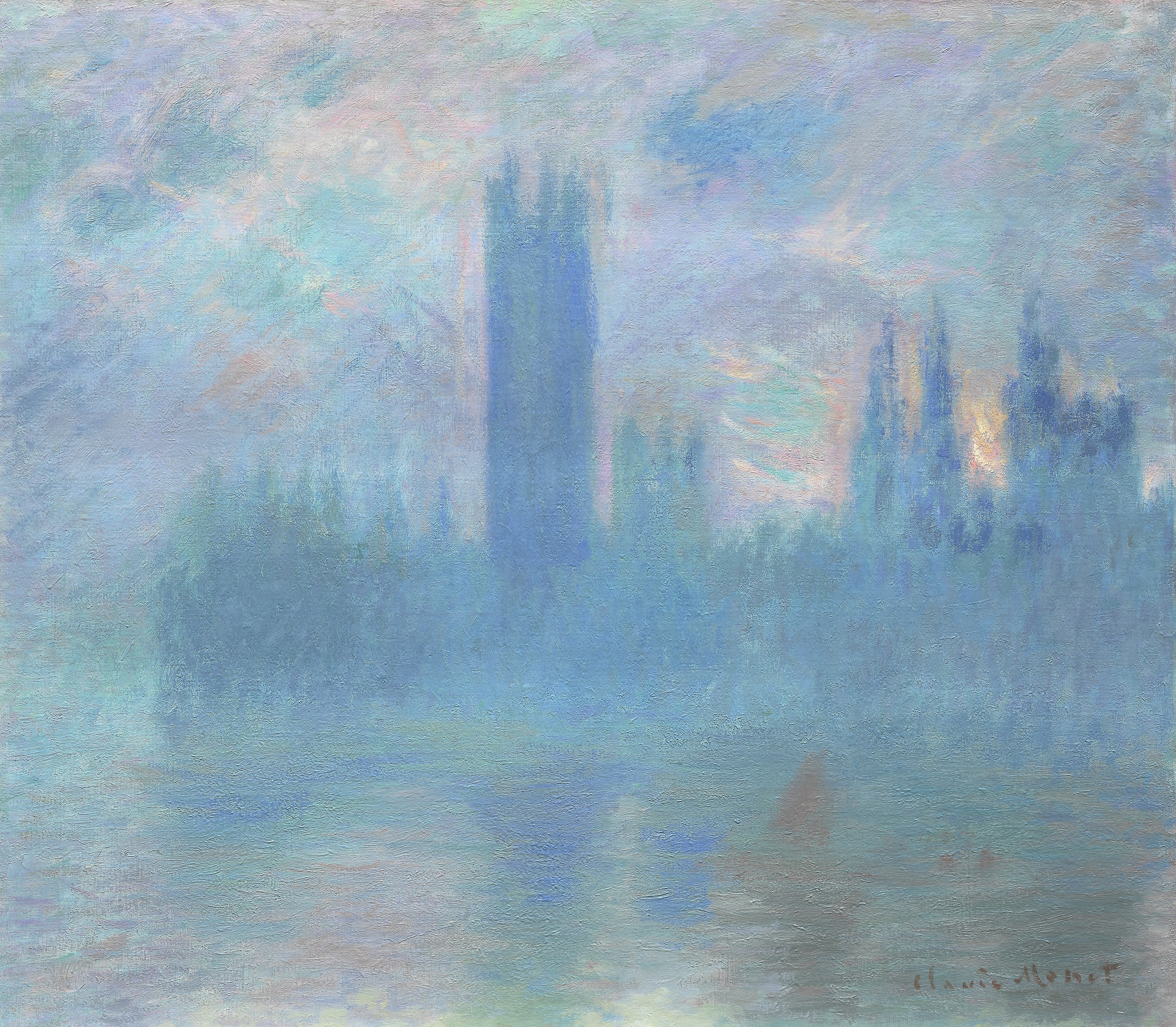
Two paintings from a series of The Houses of Parliament, London, 1900–01, Art Institute of Chicago

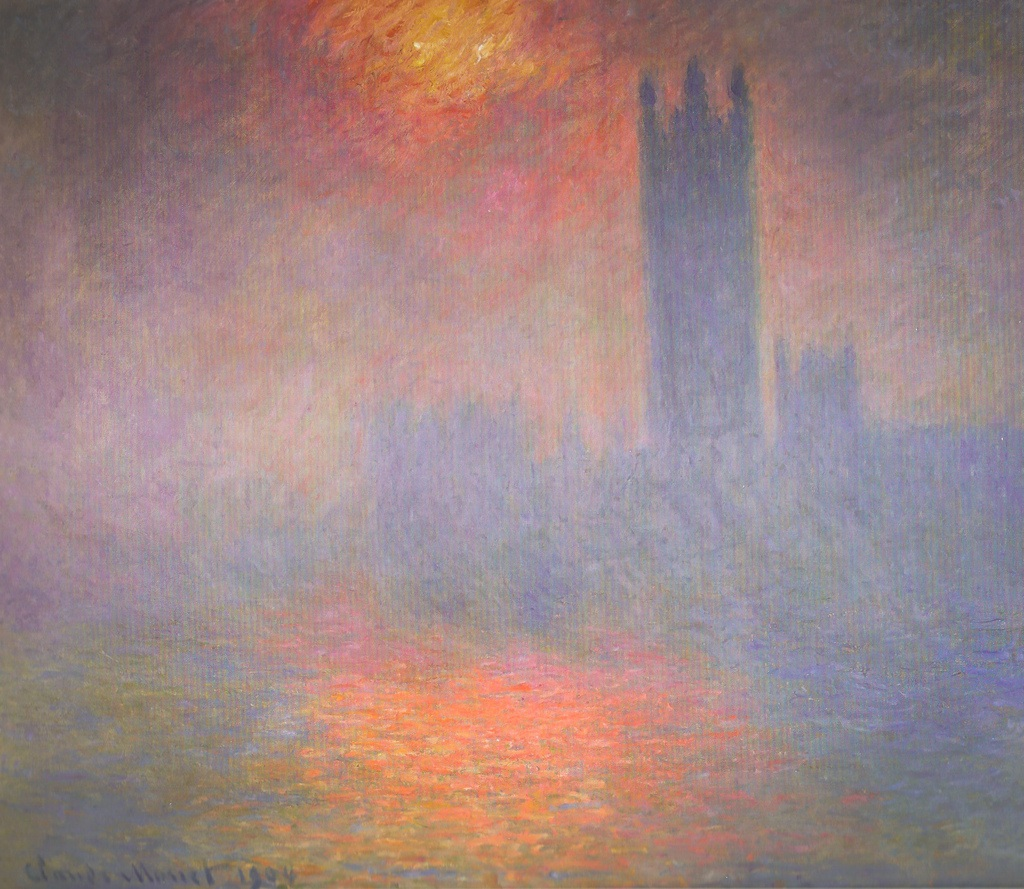
London, Houses of Parliament. The Sun Shining through the Fog, 1904, Musée d'Orsay

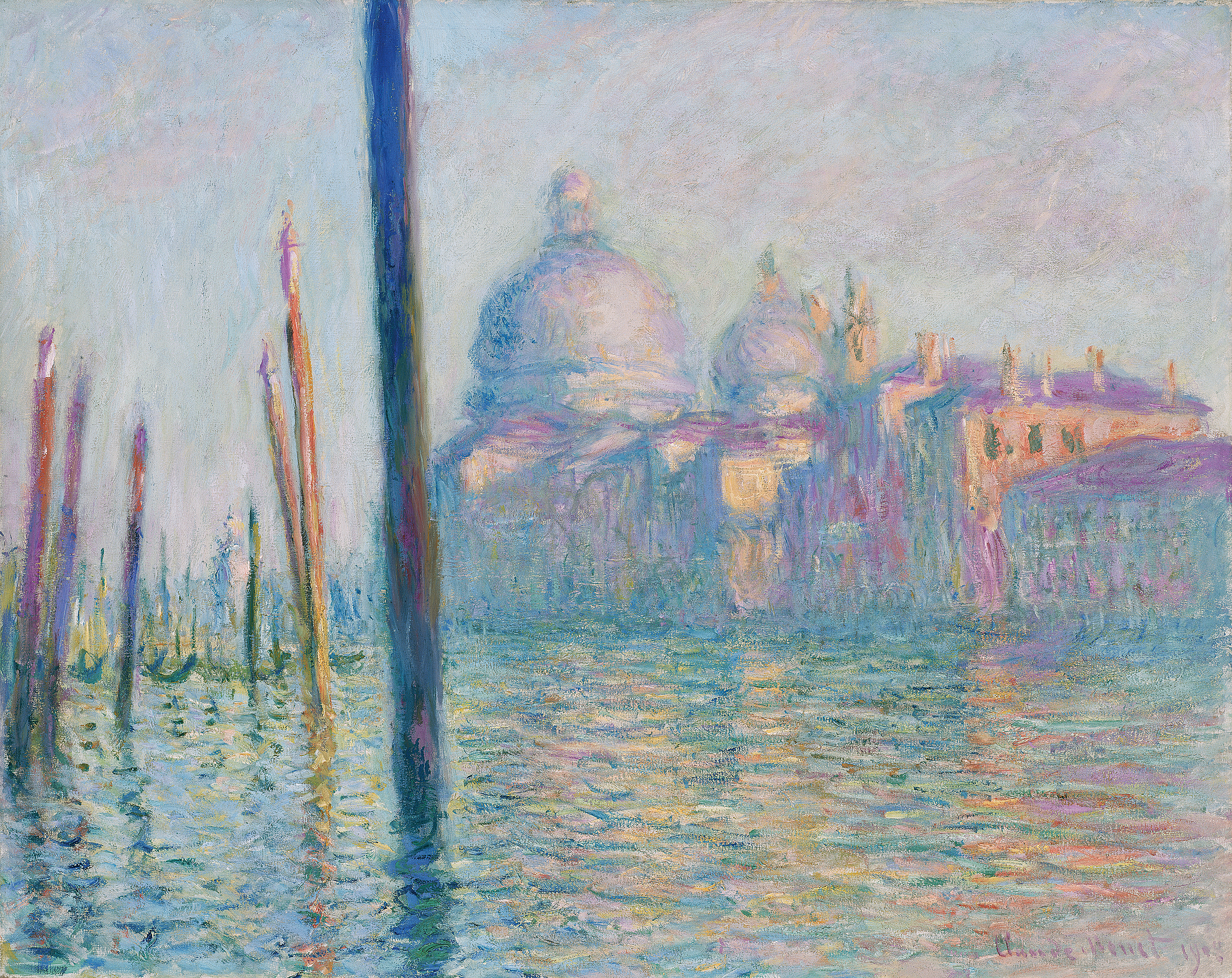
Grand Canal, Venice, 1908, Museum of Fine Arts, Boston

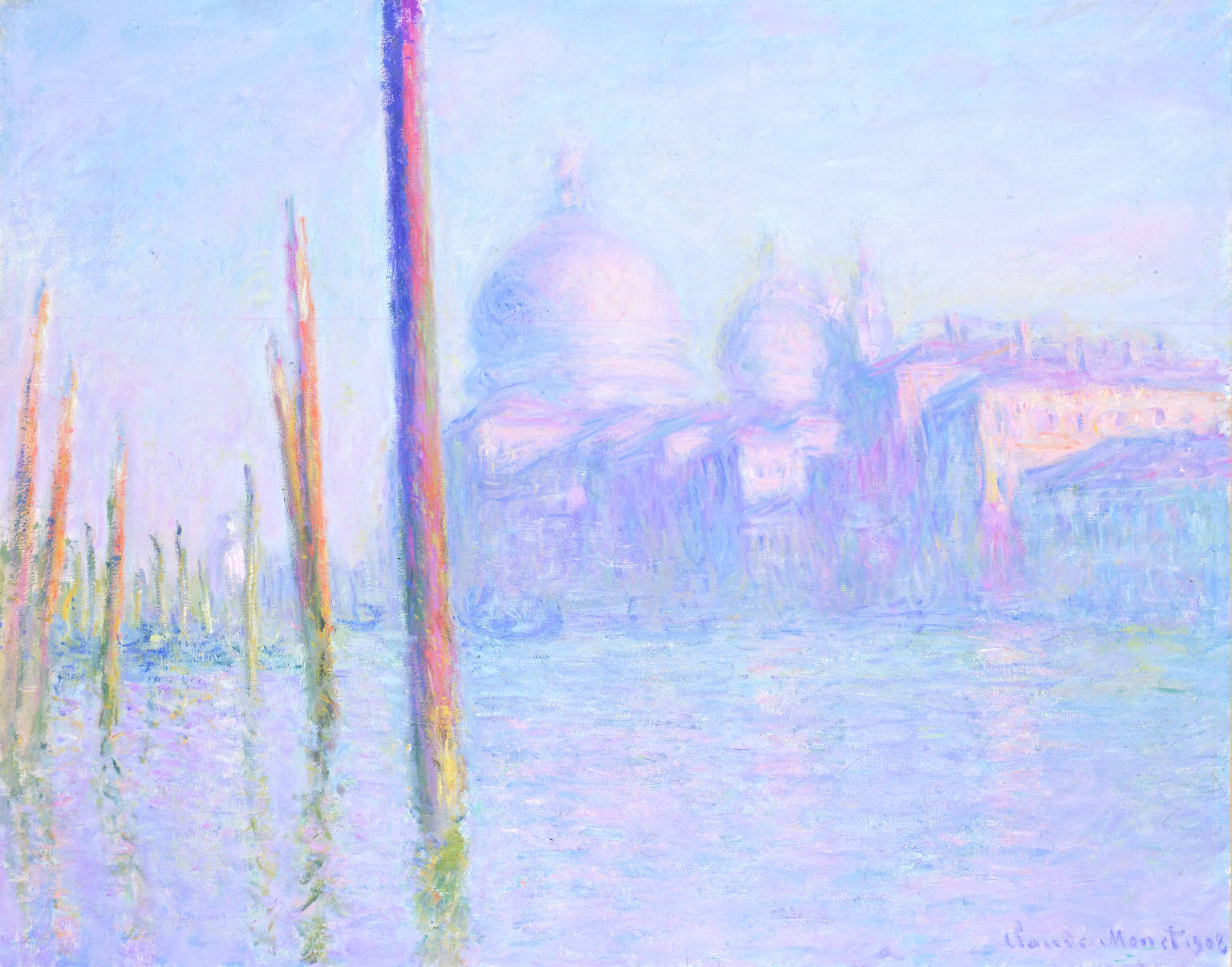
Grand Canal, Venice, 1908, Fine Arts Museums of San Francisco

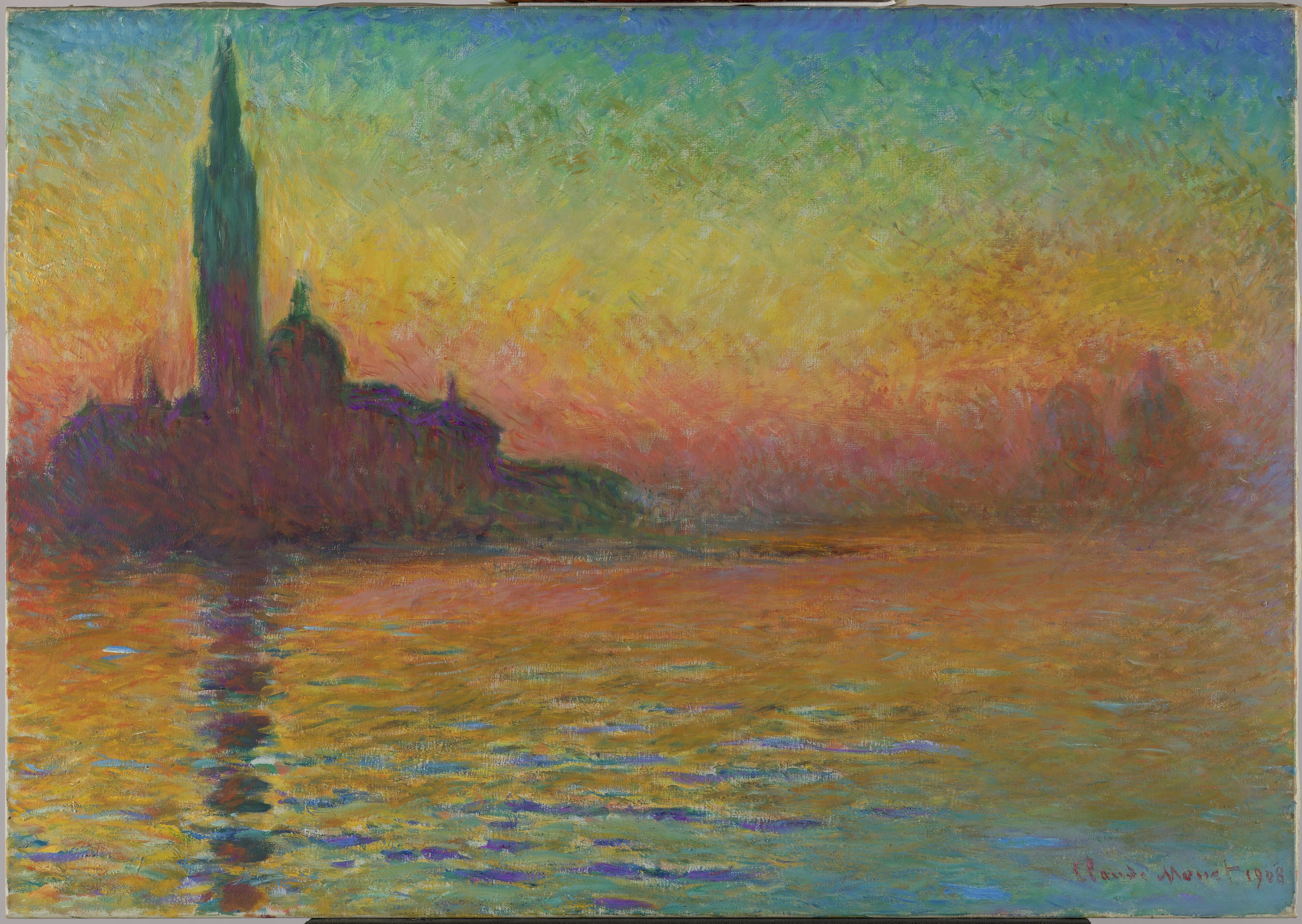
San Giorgio Maggiore at Dusk, 1908, National Museum Cardiff

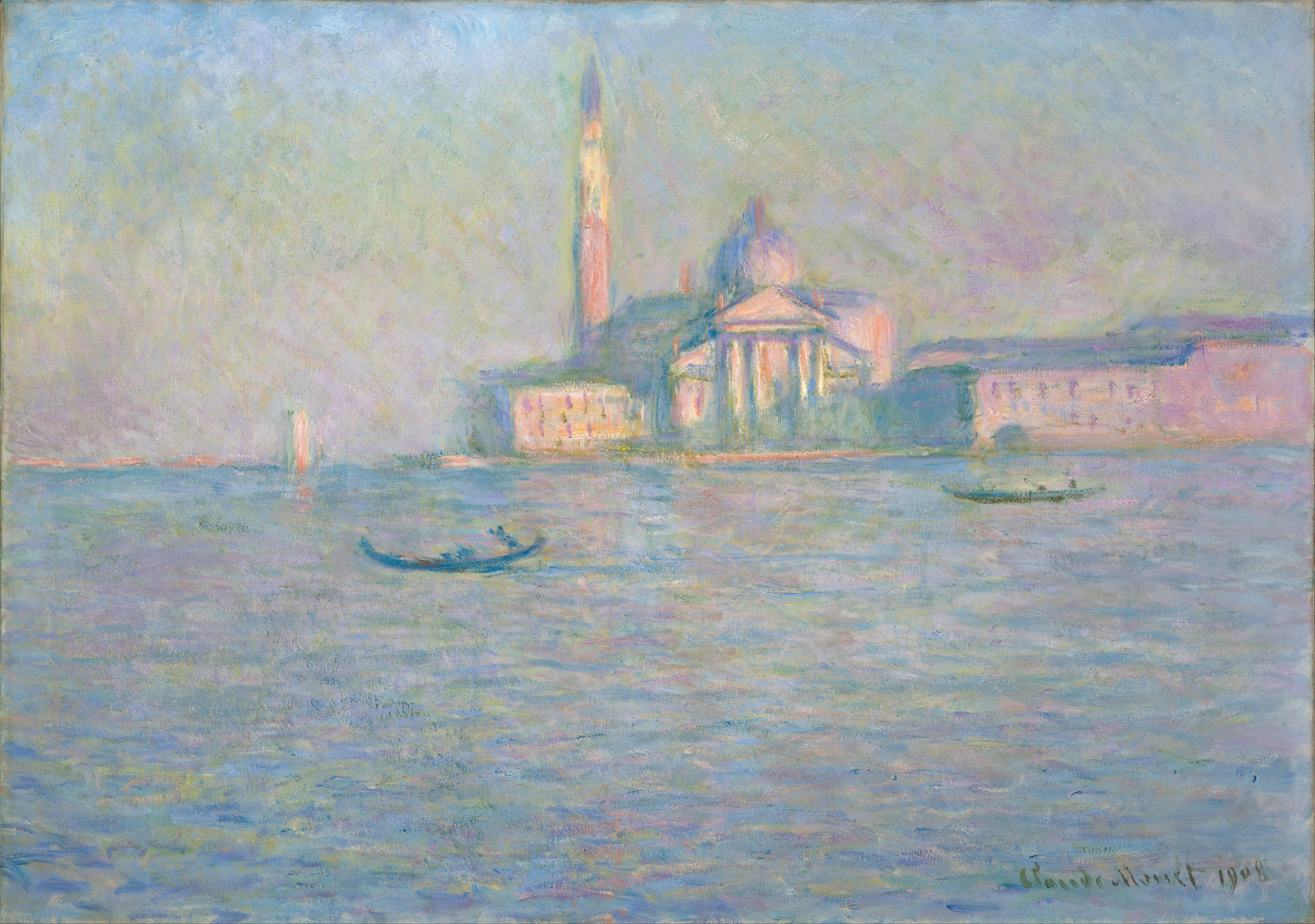
San Giorgio Maggiore, 1908, Indianapolis Museum of Art

=== Water lilies ===
Following his return from London, Monet painted mostly from nature, in his own garden; its water lilies, its pond and its bridge. From 22 November to 15 December 1900, another exhibition dedicated to him was held at the Durand-Ruel gallery, with around ten versions of the Water Lilies exhibited. This same exhibition was organized in February 1901 in New York City, where it was met with great success.

In 1901, Monet enlarged the pond of his home by buying a meadow located on the other side of the Ru, the local watercourse. He then divided his time between work on nature and work in his studio.

The canvases dedicated to the water lilies evolved with the changes made to his garden. In addition, around 1905, Monet gradually modified his aesthetics by abandoning the perimeter of the body of water and therefore modifying his perspective. He also changed the shape and size of his canvases by moving from rectangular stretchers to square and then circular stretchers.

These canvases were created with great difficulty: Monet spent a significant amount of time reworking them in order to find the perfect effects and impressions. When he deemed them unsuccessful he did not hesitate to destroy them. He continually postponed the Durand-Ruel exhibition until he was satisfied with the works. After several postponements dating back to 1906, the exhibition Les Nymphéas opened on 6 May 1909. Comprising 48 paintings dating from 1903 to 1908, representing a series of landscapes and water lily scenes, the exhibition was again a success.

Water lilies

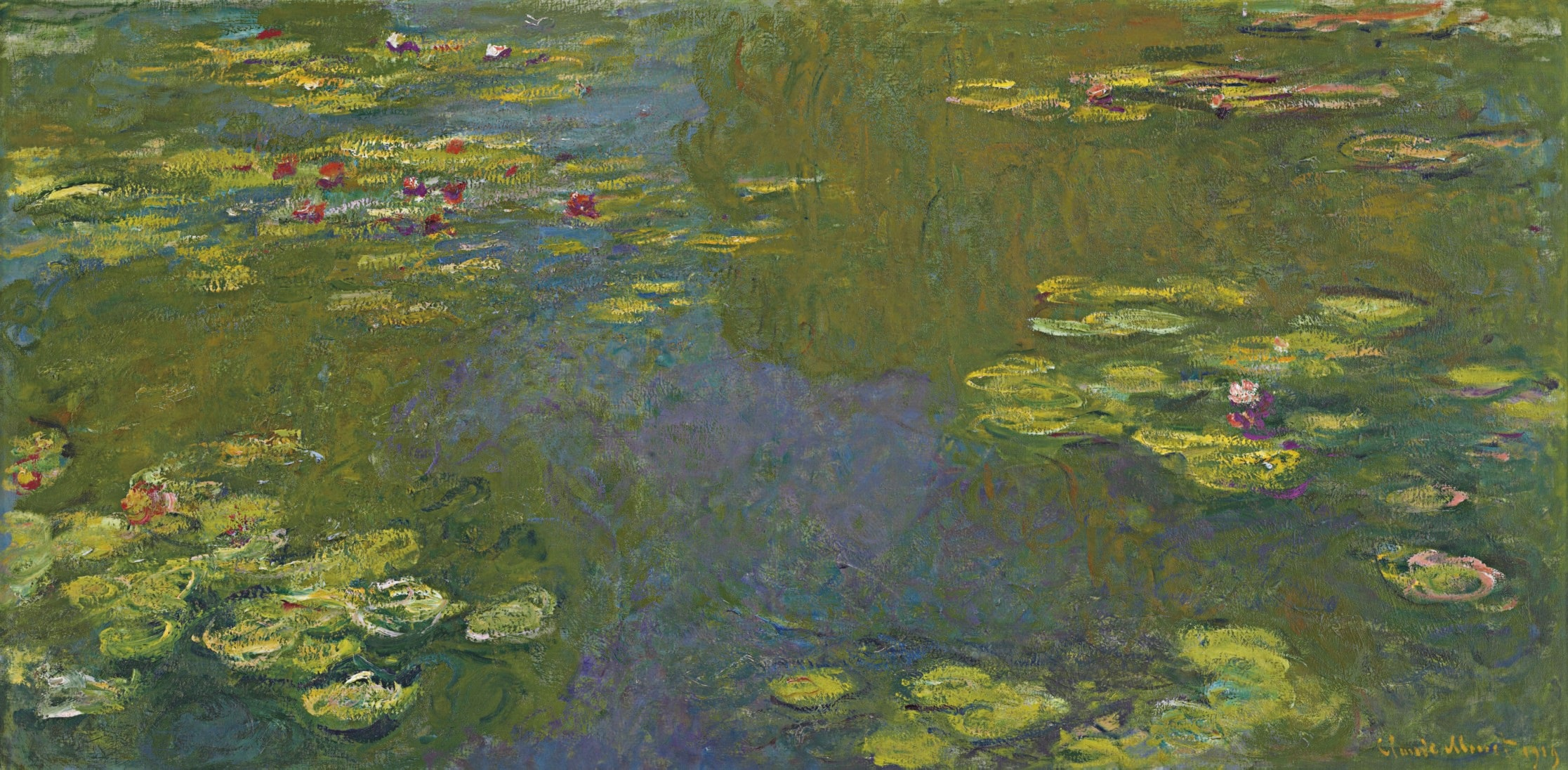
Le Bassin Aux Nymphéas, 1919. Monet's late series of water lily paintings are among his best-known works.

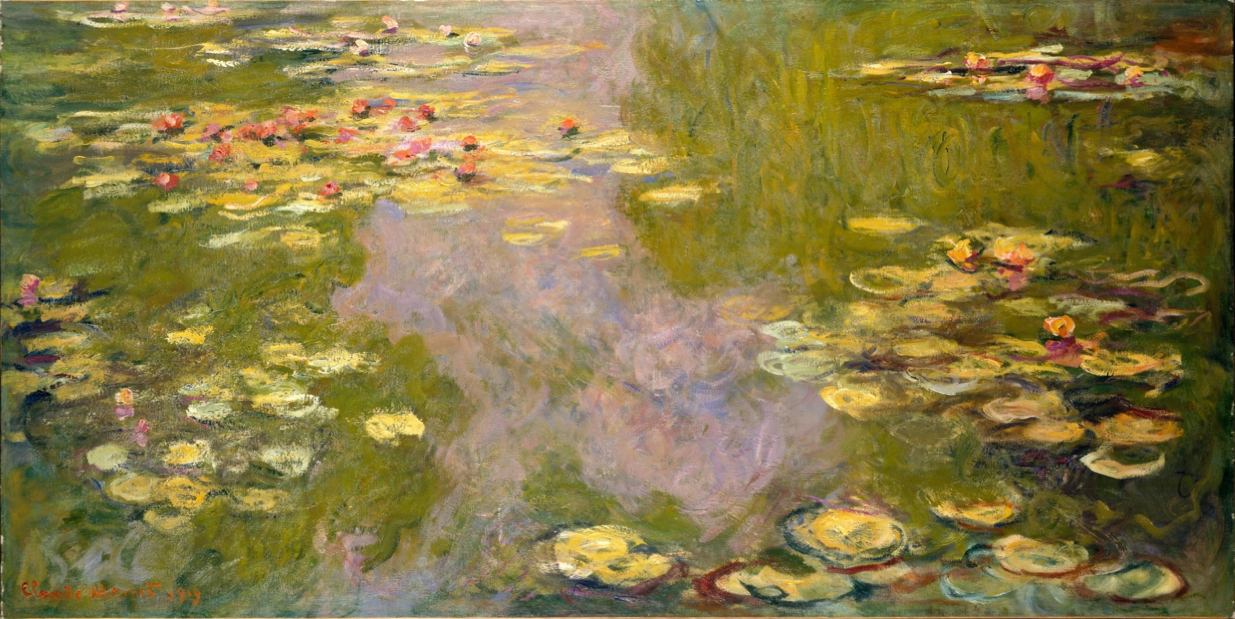
Water Lilies, 1919, Metropolitan Museum of Art, New York

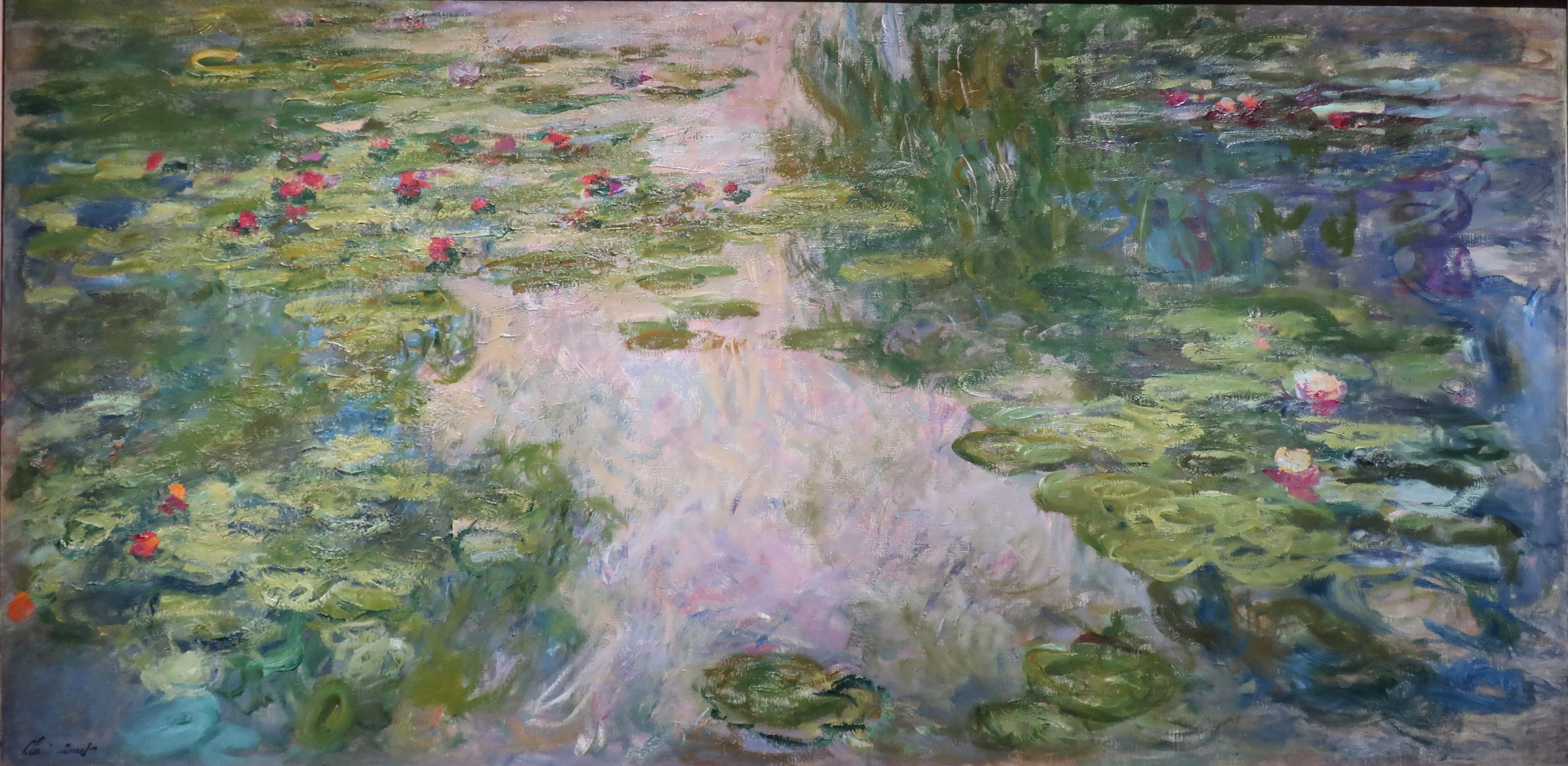
Water Lilies, 1917–1919, Honolulu Museum of Art

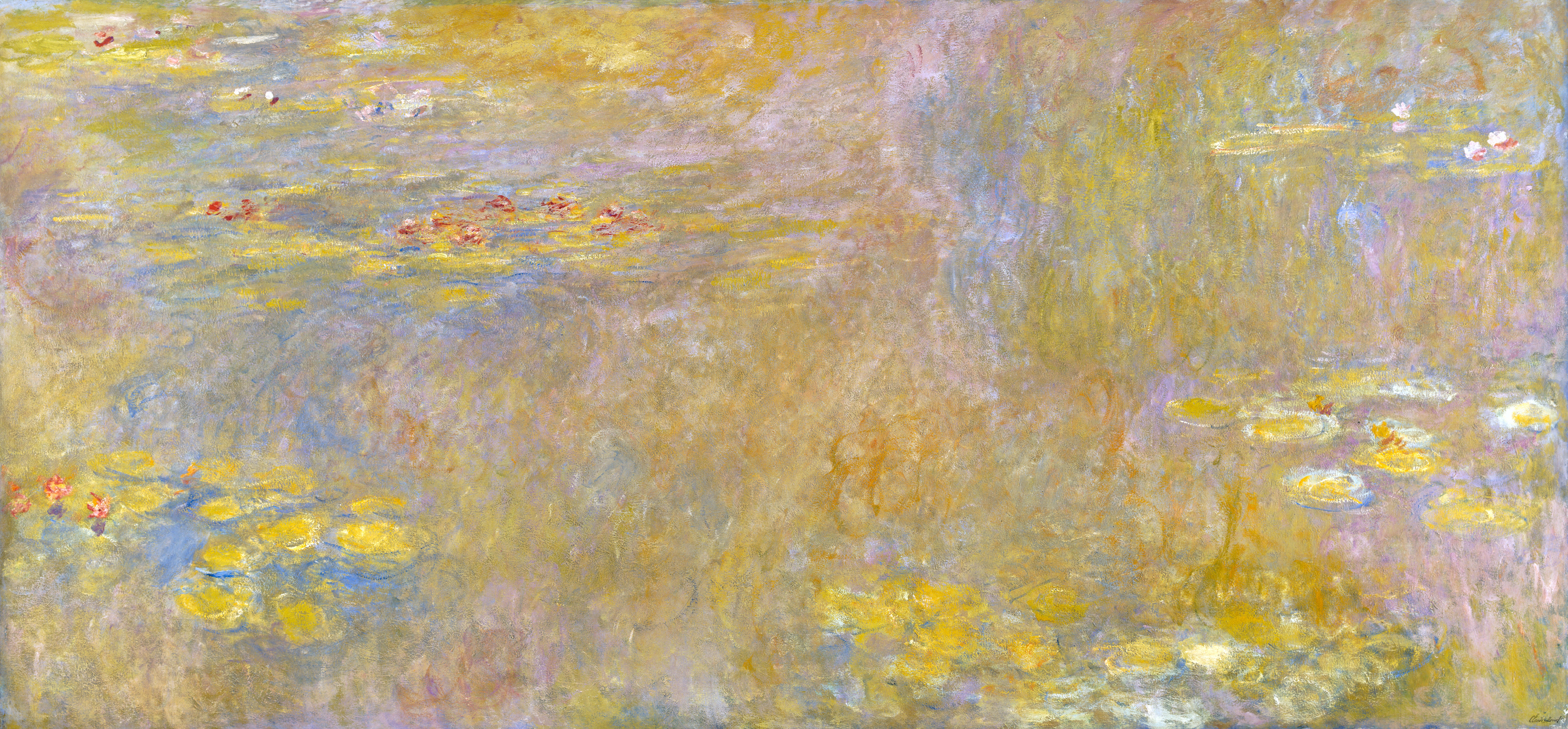
Water Lilies, 1920, National Gallery, London

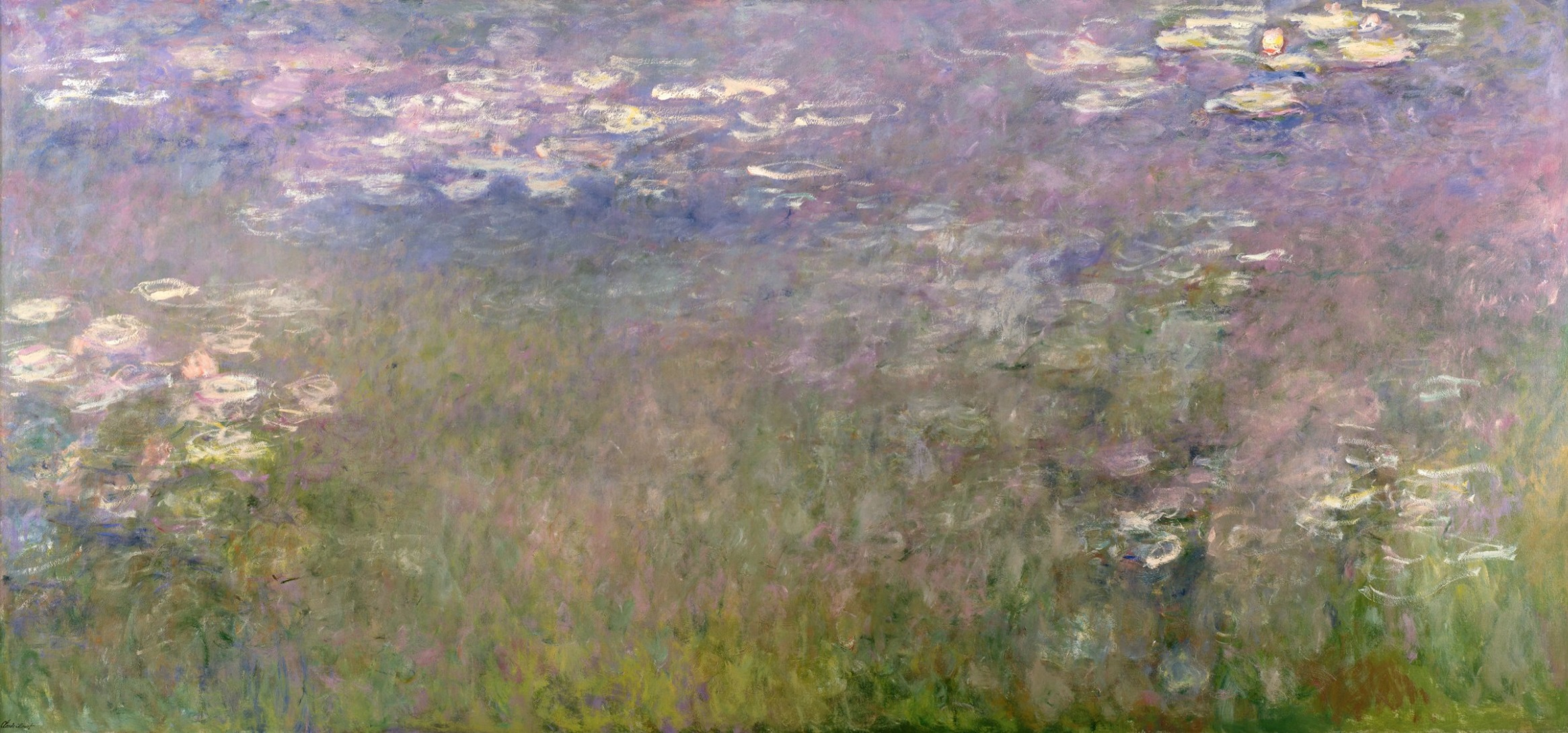
Water Lilies, c. 1915–1926, Nelson-Atkins Museum of Art, Kansas City, Missouri

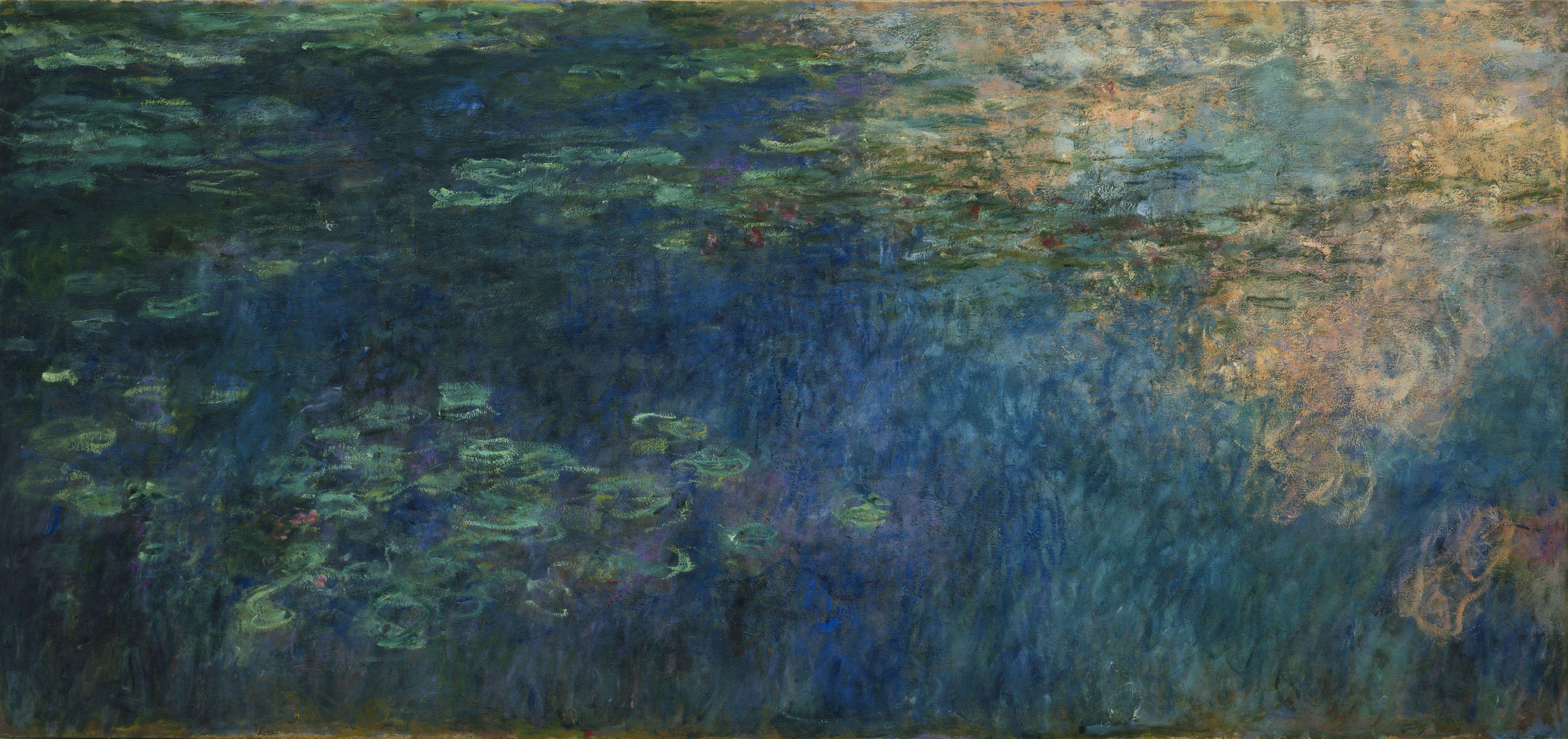
Reflections of Clouds on the Water-Lily Pond, c. 1920, Museum of Modern Art, New York

== Death ==
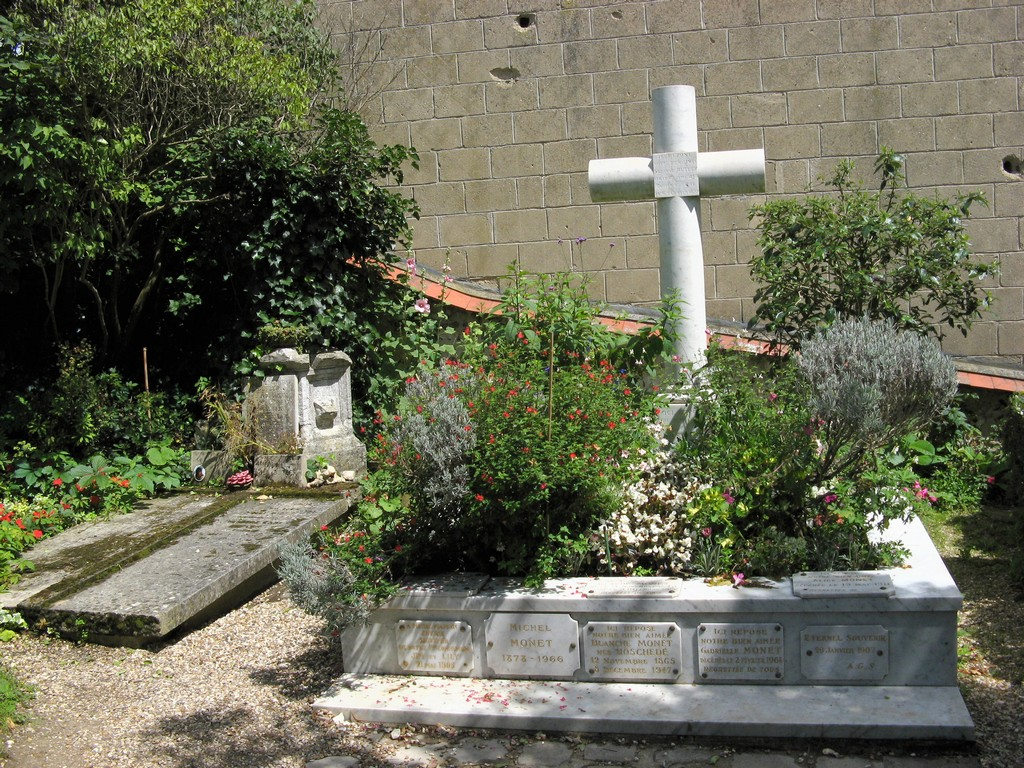
Monet family grave at Giverny

Claude Monet died of lung cancer on Sunday, December 5, 1926, at the age of 86 and is buried in the Giverny church cemetery. Monet had insisted that the occasion be simple; thus, only about fifty people attended the ceremony. At his funeral, Clemenceau removed the black cloth draped over the coffin, stating: "No black for Monet!" and replaced it with a flower-patterned cloth. At the time of his death, Waterlilies was "technically unfinished".

Monet's home, garden, and water lily pond were bequeathed by Michel to the French Academy of Fine Arts (part of the Institut de France) in 1966. Through the Fondation Claude Monet, the house and gardens were opened for visits in 1980, following restoration. In addition to souvenirs of Monet and other objects of his life, the house contains his collection of Japanese woodcut prints, which had a pronounced influence on his art. The house and garden, along with the Museum of Impressionism, are major attractions in Giverny, which hosts tourists from all over the world. The relationship between Giverny and Monet’s late work was the focus of the posthumous exhibition Monet’s Garden, organised with the Musée Marmottan Monet and presented at the Sakıp Sabancı Museum in Istanbul from 9 October 2012 to 6 January 2013.

== Legacy ==
Speaking of Monet's body of work, Wildenstein said that it is "so extensive that its very ambition and diversity challenges our understanding of its importance". His paintings produced at Giverny and under the influence of cataracts have been said to create a link between Impressionism and twentieth-century art and modern abstract art, respectively. His later works were a "major" inspiration to Objective abstraction. Ellsworth Kelly, following a formative experience at Giverny, paid homage to Monet's works created there with Tableau Vert (1952). Monet has been called an "intermediary" between tradition and modernism—his work has been examined in relation to postmodernism and influenced Bazille, Sisley, Renoir, and Pissarro. Monet is now the most famous of the Impressionists; as a result of his contributions to the movement, he "exerted a huge influence on late 19th-century art".

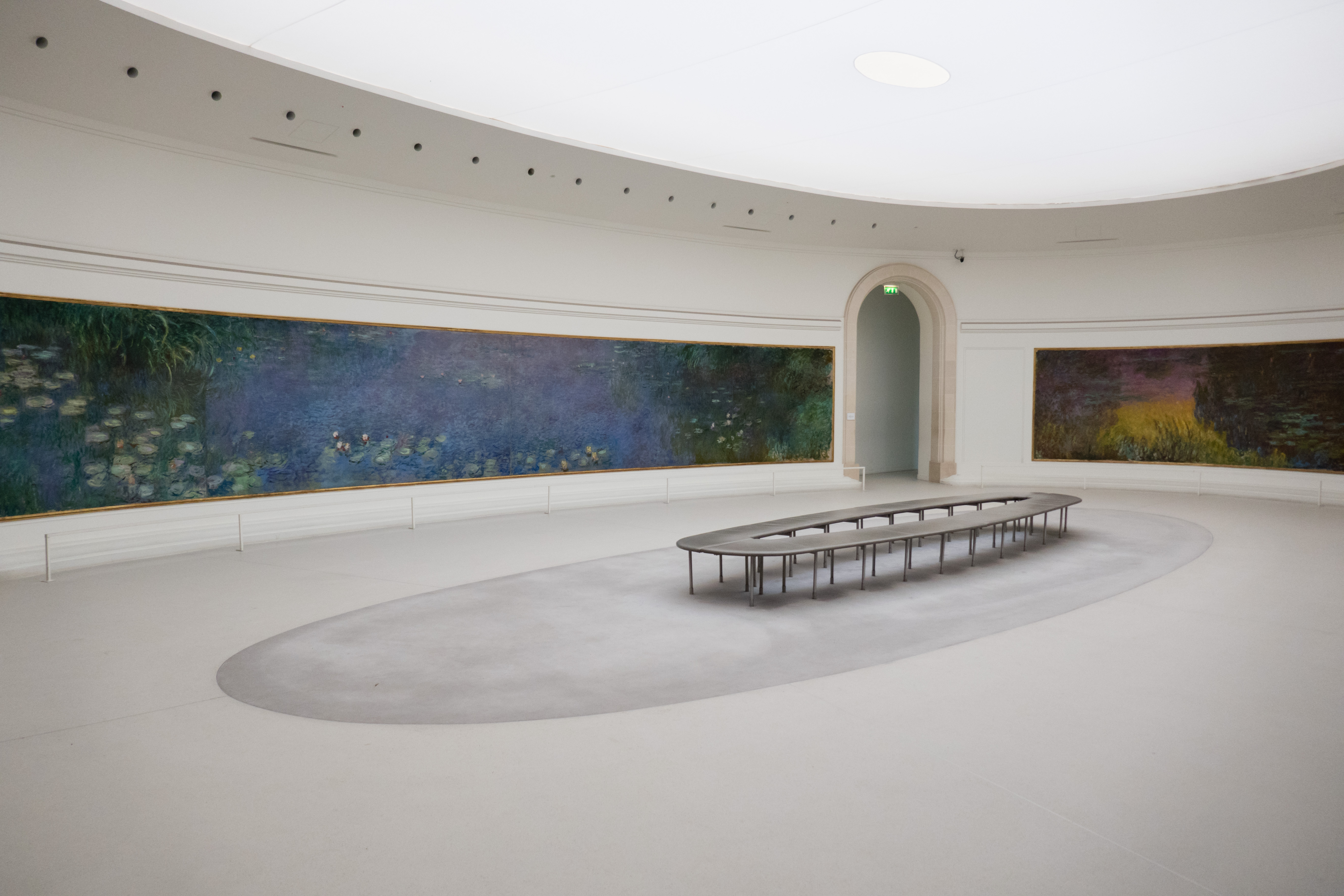
Water Lilies on display in the Musée de l'Orangerie in Paris

In May 1927, 27 panel paintings were displayed in the Musée de l'Orangerie, following lengthy negotiations with the French government. Because his later works were ignored by artists, art historians, critics, and the public, few attended the showing. In the 1950s, Monet's later works were "rediscovered" by the Abstract Expressionists, who used similar canvases and were uninterested in the blunt and ideological art of the war. A 1952 essay by André Masson helped change the perception of the paintings and inspired an appreciation that began to take shape in 1956–1957. The next year, a fire in the Museum of Modern Art would see the Water Lilies paintings it had acquired burn. The large-scale nature of Monet's later paintings proved to be difficult for some museums, which resulted in their altering the framing.

In 1978, Monet's garden in Giverny—which had grown decrepit over 50 years—was restored and opened to the public. In 2004, London, the Parliament, Effects of Sun in the Fog (Londres, le Parlement, trouée de soleil dans le brouillard; 1904), sold for US$20.1 million. In 2006, the journal Proceedings of the Royal Society published a paper providing evidence that these were painted in situ at St. Thomas' Hospital over the river Thames. In 1981, Ronald Pickvance noted that Monet's works after 1880 were increasingly receiving scholarly attention.

Falaises près de Dieppe (Cliffs Near Dieppe) has been stolen on two occasions, once in 1998 (in which the museum's curator was convicted of the theft and jailed for five years and two months, along with two accomplices) and again in August 2007. It was recovered in June 2008.

On 14 November 2001, a Google Doodle was made for Claude Monet's 161st birthday, depicting the Google logo in Monet's signature style. It was the first Google Doodle made for someone's birthday.

Monet's Le Pont du chemin de fer à Argenteuil, an 1873 painting of a railway bridge spanning the Seine near Paris, was bought by an anonymous telephone bidder for a record $41.4 million at Christie's auction in New York on 6 May 2008. The previous record for a Monet painting stood at $36.5 million. A few weeks later, Le bassin aux nymphéas (from the water lilies series) sold at Christie's 24 June 2008 auction in London for £40,921,250 ($80,451,178), nearly doubling the record for the artist. This purchase represented one of the top 20 highest prices paid for a painting at the time.

In October 2013, Monet's paintings L'Eglise de Vétheuil and Le Bassin aux Nympheas became subjects of a legal case in New York against New York-based Vilma Bautista, one-time aide to Imelda Marcos, wife of dictator Ferdinand Marcos, after she sold Le Bassin aux Nympheas for US$32 million to a Swiss buyer. The said Monet paintings, along with two others, were acquired by Imelda during her husband's presidency and allegedly bought using the nation's funds. Bautista's lawyer claimed that the aide sold the painting for Imelda but did not have a chance to give her the money. The Philippine government has sought the return of the painting. Le Bassin aux Nympheas, also known as Japanese Footbridge over the Water-Lily Pond at Giverny, is part of Monet's famed Water Lilies series.

A sympathetic portrait of Claude Monet can be found in R. W. Meek's historical fiction novel series The Dream Collector, both in Book I and Book II. Monet's documented attack of hysterical blindness is reimagined and cured through hypnosis by the dream collector, Julie Forette.

Monet is the subject of the 2023 biography Monet: The Restless Vision by Jackie Wullschläger, which won the 2024 Elizabeth Longford Prize for Historical Biography.

=== Nazi looting ===
Under the Nazi regime, both in Germany from 1933 and in German-occupied countries until 1945, Jewish art collectors of Monet were robbed by Nazis and their agents. Several of the stolen artworks have been returned to their rightful owners, while others have been the object of court battles. In 2014, during the spectacular discovery of a hidden trove of art in Munich, a Monet that had belonged to a Jewish retail magnate was found in the suitcase of Cornelius Gurlitt, the son of one of Adolf Hitler's official dealers of looted art, Hildebrand Gurlitt.

Examples of Nazi-looted Monet works include:

- Bord de Mer, purchased by Austrians Adalbert and Hilda Parlagi in 1936. After the Anschluss, they fled in 1938, leaving it in a Vienna warehouse. It resurfaced in France in 2016 and was restored to the Parlagis' granddaughters in 2024.
- Haystacks at Giverny belonged to René Gimpel, a French Jewish art dealer killed in a Nazi concentration camp.
- Nymphéas, stolen by Nazis in 1940 from Paul Rosenberg.
- Au Parc Monceau, previously owned by Ludwig Kainer, whose vast collection was looted by the Nazis.
- Le Repos Dans Le Jardin Argenteuil, previously owned by Henry and Maria Newman, stolen from a Berlin bank vault, settlement with the Metropolitan Museum of Art.
- La Seine à Asnières/Les Péniches sur la Seine, formerly owned by Mrs. Fernand Halphen, taken by agents of the German Embassy in Paris on 10 July 1940.

Monet's Le Palais Ducal, and his 1880 work Poppy Field near Vétheuil, formerly in the collection of Max Emden, have been the object of restitution claims. "La Mare, Snow Effect" ("La Mare, effect de neige") was the object of a settlement with the heirs of Richard Semmel.

== See also ==
- List of paintings by Claude Monet
