= Monet (name) =

Monet or Monét is a given name and surname. Monet may refer to Claude Monet (1840–1926), a French impressionist painter. Notable people with the name include the following:

== Given name ==
- Monet Hurst-Mendoza, American playwright
- Monet Mazur (born 1976), American actress
- Monét X Change (born 1990), the stage name of American drag queen Kevin Bertin.

== Surname ==
- Akim Monet (born 1968), Swiss photographer
- Aja Monet (born 1987), American poet and writer
- Blanche Hoschedé Monet (1865–1947), French painter, stepdaughter/daughter-in-law of Claude Monet
- Camillia Monet, American actress and film producer
- Daniella Monet (born 1989), American actress, singer, and dancer
- Dominique Monet (1865–1923), Canadian politician
- Jean Monet (son of Claude Monet) (1867–1913), son of Claude Monet
- Jerzee Monét stage name of Tanisha Monét Carey (born 1977), American singer-songwriter
- Margarita Monet (born 1990), American singer
- Michel Monet (1878–1966), son of Claude Monet
- Simonne Monet-Chartrand (1919–1993), Canadian activist
- Victoria Monét (born 1993), American singer and songwriter

== See also ==
- Manet (disambiguation)
- Moneta (name)
