= Alice Hoschedé =

French artists' model (1844–1911)

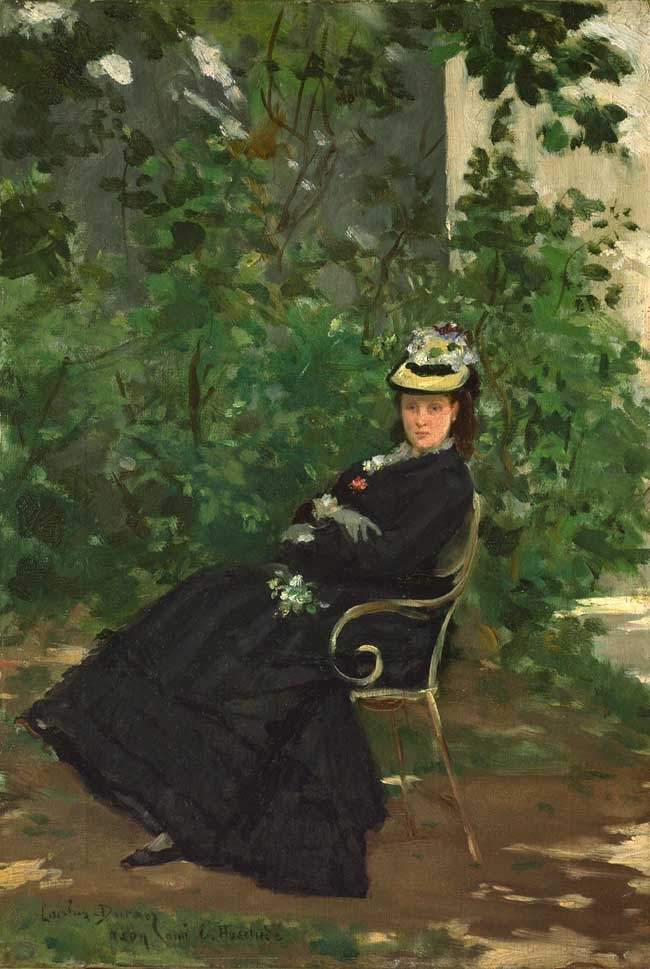
Carolus-Duran, Alice Hoschedé, second wife of Claude Monet and mother of Blanche Hoschedé Monet, 1878

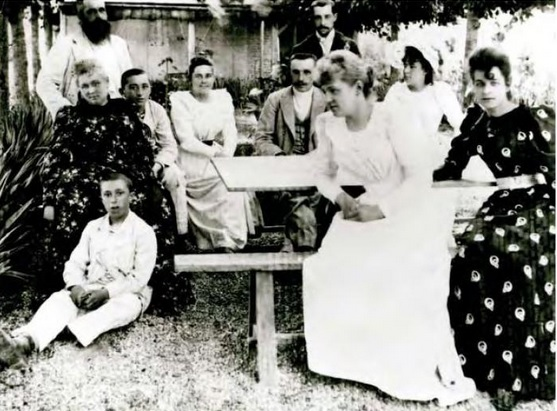
The Monet and Hoschedé families c. 1880 from left to right: Claude Monet, Alice Hoschedé, Jean-Pierre Hoschedé, Jacques Hoschedé, Blanche Hoschedé Monet, Jean Monet, Michel Monet, Martha Hoschedé, Germaine Hoschedé, Suzanne Hoschedé

Alice Raingo Hoschedé Monet (February 19, 1844 – May 19, 1911) was the wife of department store magnate and art collector Ernest Hoschedé and later of the Impressionist painter Claude Monet.

== Early life ==
According to unsourced genealogical data reported by Michael Legrand, she was born Angélique Émilie Alice Raingo on February 19, 1844, in Paris to Belgian born Denis Lucien Alphonse Raingo and his wife Jeanne Coralie Boulade.

== Marriage to Ernest Hoschedé ==
After meeting her future daughter-in-law in 1863, Ernest Hoschedé's mother wrote of Alice:

This young woman has wit, intelligence in plenty and, I believe, strength of will. Her conversation is easy, though I find her voice rather loud. She seemed to me more delicate and prettier than in her photograph.

Her children (by Ernest Hoschedé) were Blanche (who married Claude's son, Jean Monet), Germaine, Suzanne, Marthe, Jean-Pierre, and Jacques.

== Life with the Monet family ==
In 1876, Ernest Hoschedé commissioned Monet to paint decorative panels for the Château de Rottembourg and several landscape paintings. The four panels representing Les Dindons (The Turkeys), l'Étang à Montgeron (Pond at Montgeron), Coin de Jardin à Montgeron (A Corner in the Garden at Montgeron) and La Chasse (The Hunt) were however never installed in the rotunda of the château.

According to the Nineteenth-century European Art: A Topical Dictionary, it may have been during this visit that Monet began a relationship with Alice and her youngest son, Jean-Pierre, may have been fathered by Monet. (Note: Jean-Pierre was born nine months after Monet had been left alone with Alice Hoschedé in her chateau during the summer and autumn months.)

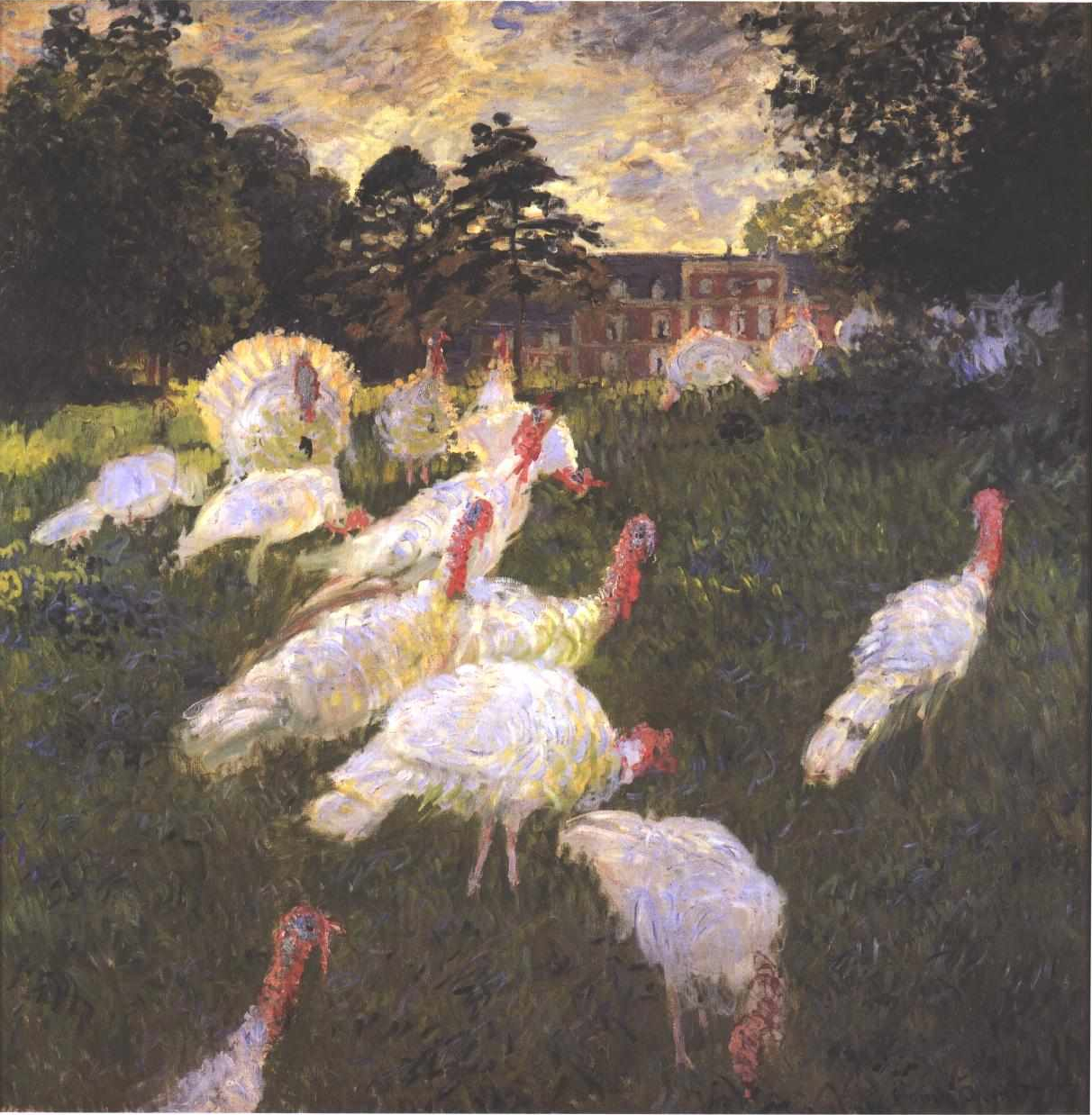
"Les Dindons" ("The Turkeys"), painted by Claude Monet in 1877, was one of four paintings commissioned by Ernest Hoschedé to adorn the salon of his Château de Rottembourg. Now in the Musée d'Orsay.

Ernest Hoschedé went bankrupt in 1877. Ernest, Alice, and their children moved into a house in Vétheuil with Monet, Monet's first wife Camille, and the Monet's two sons, Jean and Michel. Ernest spent increasing lengths of time in Paris. He then lived in Paris and worked at le Voltaire.

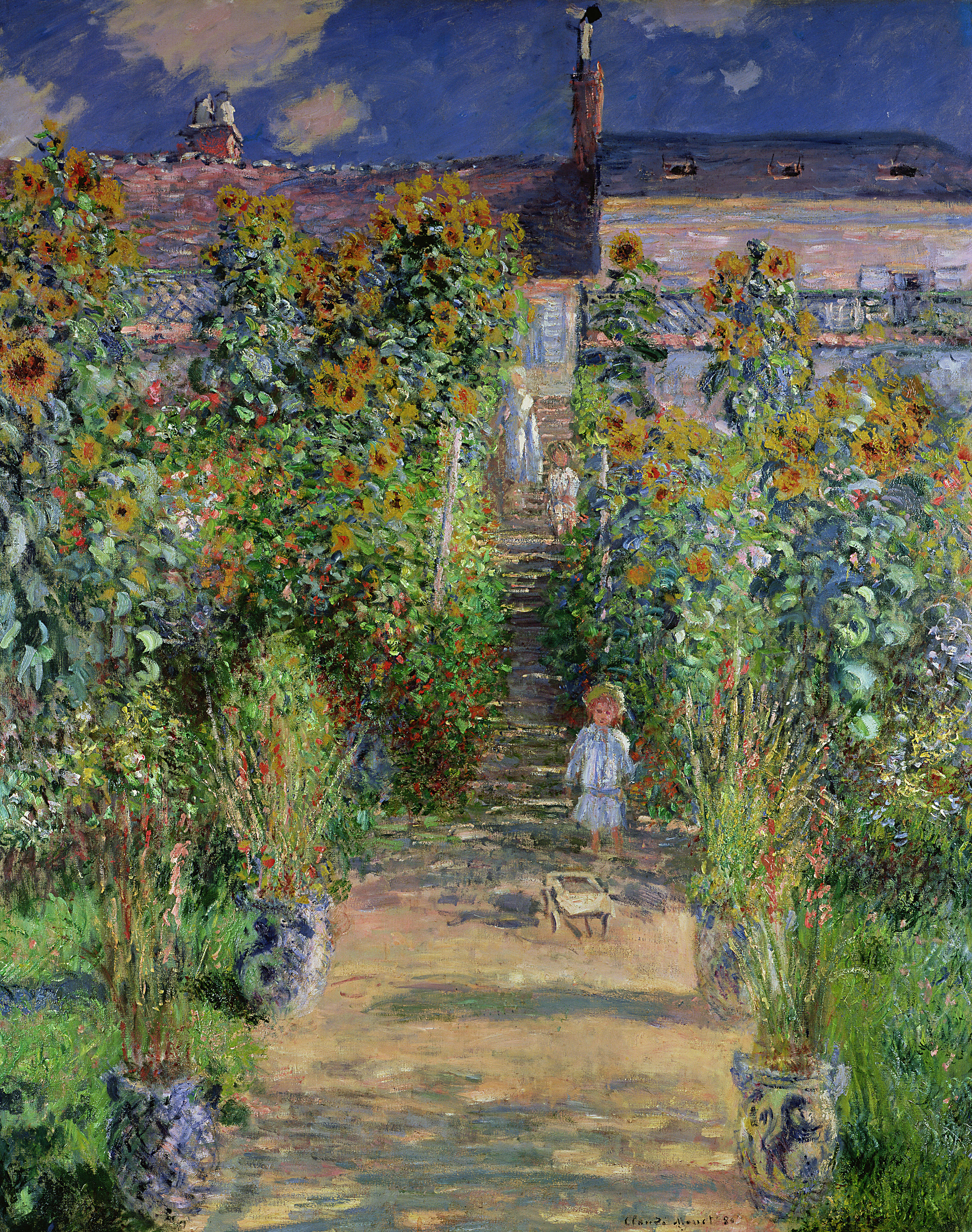
Claude Monet, Monet's garden at Vétheuil, 1880, Michel Monet and Jean-Pierre Hoschedé

There were times when Ernest Hoschedé returned to visit his wife and children at the successive Monet households of Vétheuil, Poissy and Giverny. During those times Monet left the household. The separation from Alice, though, left Monet greatly distressed, experiencing nightmares, and generally unable to paint.

Monet's last campaign at Etretat coincides with the presence of Ernest Hoschedé at the birthday celebration of his wife at Giverny. Monet is "annihilated" by this development, and although he acknowledges that it would be better not to send Mme Hoschedé such a bleak account, he cannot resist acquainting her of his pain. Along with obsessive thoughts of her, Monet also claims to have unceasing concern for "our two little ones, so cute and nice". The reference is to Camille Monet's son Michel (b. 1878) and Alice Hoschedé's son Jean-Pierre (b. 1877); the implication here and elsewhere in the correspondence may be that Monet is the father of both.

— Steven Z. Levine

Before the Monet and Hoschedé families had moved to Poissy, Ernest Hoschedé had refused to pay his share of the upkeep for Alice and the children. In 1886 he showed up and demanded that his wife and children return with him to Paris, but Alice remained with Monet.

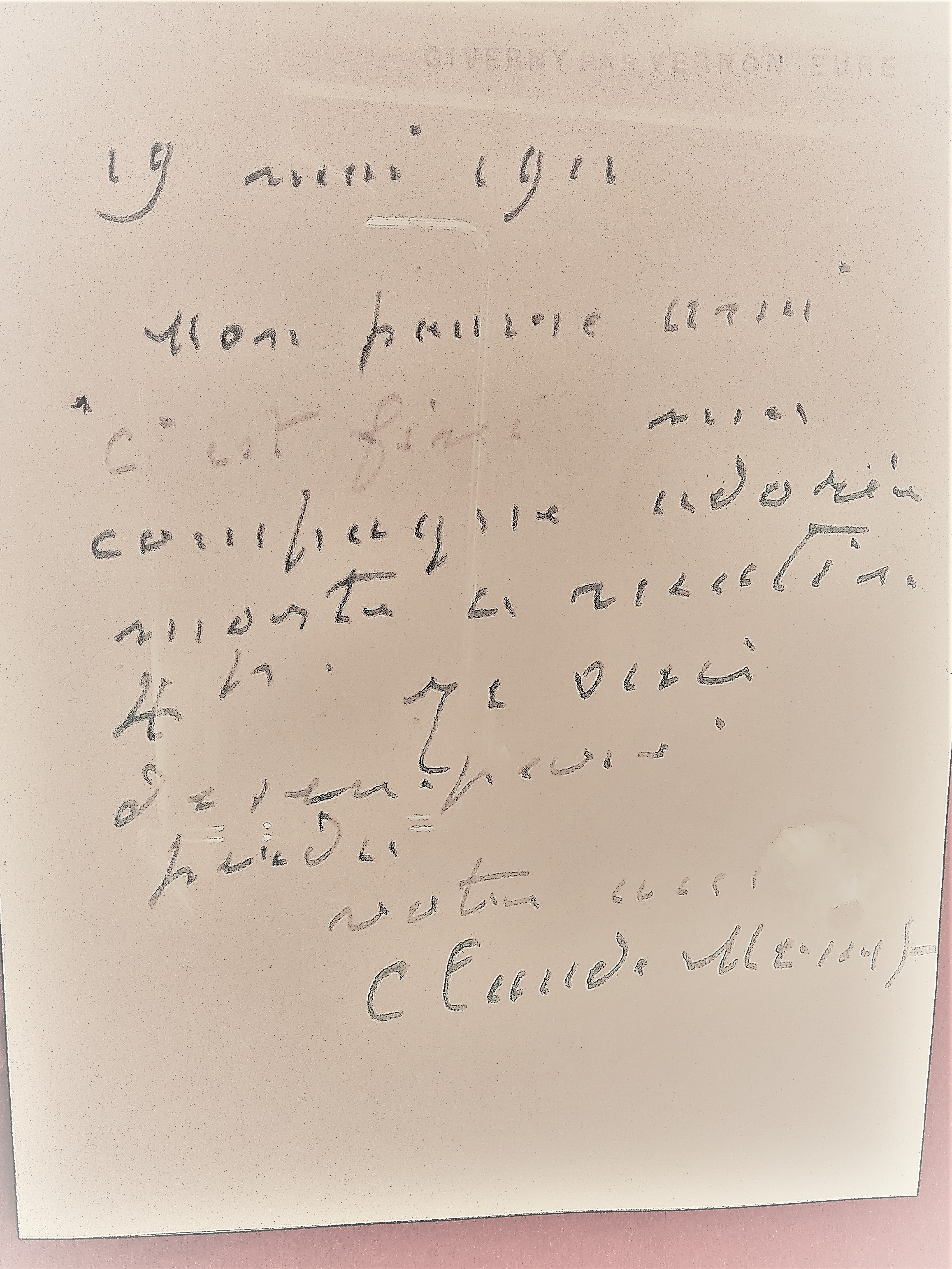
Autograph letter from Claude Monet, dated 19 May 1911, addressed to his friend Gustave Geffroy, announcing the death of his wife Alice: "My poor friend, it's over. My beloved companion died this morning. 4h. I am distraught, lost. Your friend. Claude Monet".

== Relationship with Claude Monet ==
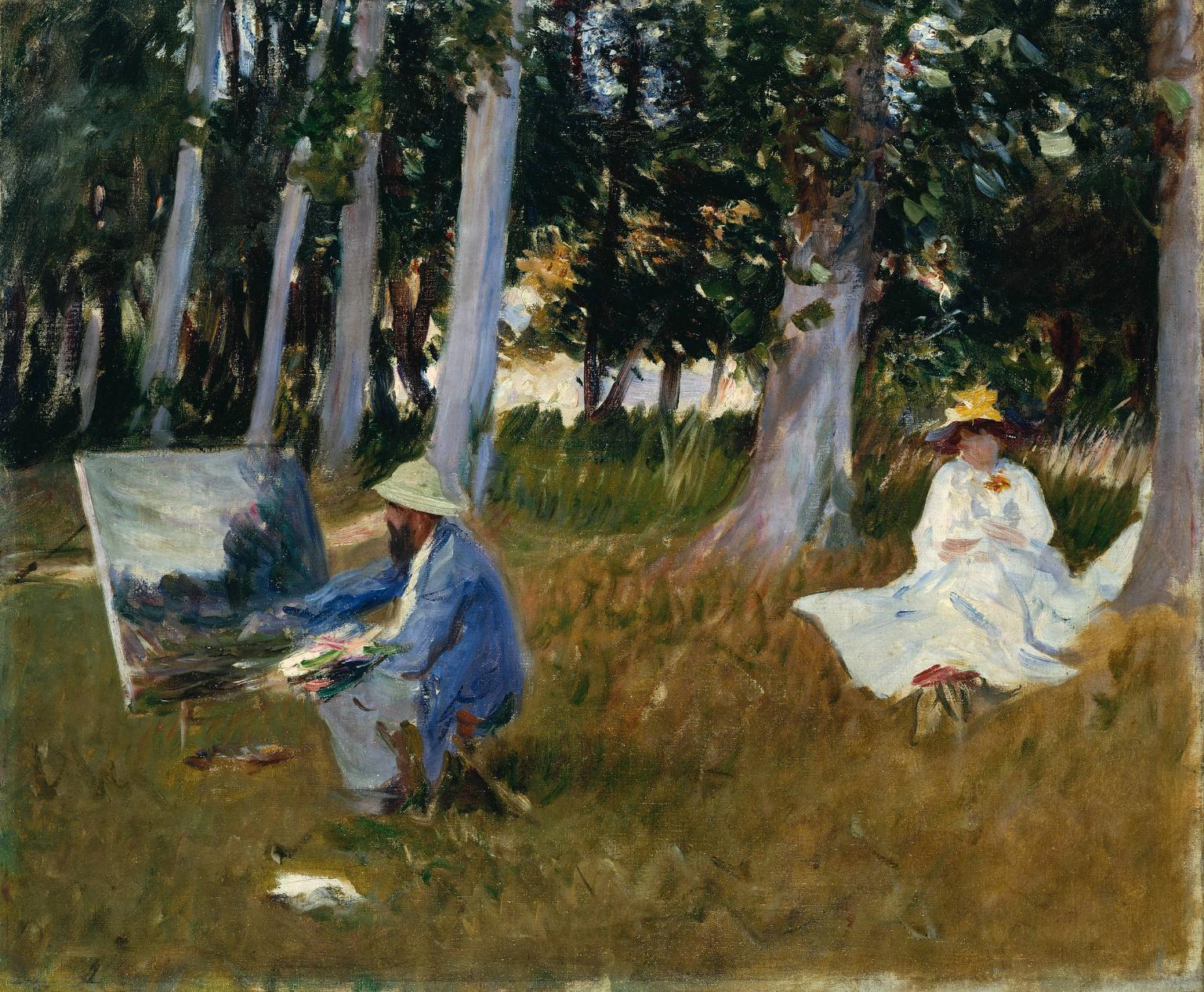
John Singer Sargent, Claude Monet Painting by the Edge of a Wood, 1885 - Tate Collection

After Camille Monet's death in 1879, Monet and Alice (along with the children from the two respective families) continued living together at Poissy and later at Giverny. Still married to Ernest Hoschedé and living with Claude Monet, the Le Gaulois newspaper in Paris declared that she was Monet's "charming wife" in 1880.

Ernest Hoschedé died in 1891 and Alice agreed to marry Monet in 1892.

Madam Hoschedé came from an upper-middle-class family, and despite the irregular character of her relationship with Monet (until their marriage in 1892) she brought their home an element of respectability that the people of the village could accept more easily than they might have the casual, vaguely scandalous air of an "artistic" household... With affectionate authority she supervised the education not only of her own six children but of Monet's two sons.

— Monet's Years at Giverny: Beyond Impressionism, Metropolitan Museum of Art

Alice died on 19 May 1911. Her death deeply affected the painter. On the night of her death, he wrote to his friend, Gustave Geffroy, a French art historian and novelist:

My poor friend, it’s over. My beloved companion died this morning at 4:00. I’m distraught, lost. Your friend. Claude Monet.

This letter is on display in one of the rooms of Fondation Monet in Giverny. She is buried in Giverny, in the Monet family grave beside the east end of the village church, where Claude Monet was also buried in 1926.

== Paintings of Alice ==
Some of the paintings of Alice Hoschedé Monet are:

- Claude Monet, Breakfast under the Tent, Giverny, 1888
- John Singer Sargent, Mme Hoschedé and Her Son in Monet's Garden, Giverny, 1888
- John Singer Sargent, Claude Monet Painting by the Edge of the Wood, 1885 or 1888

== In popular culture ==
Amanda Root portrayed Hoschedé in the 2006 BBC docudrama The Impressionists.

== See also ==
- Claude Monet
- The Monet's home in Giverny
