= Woman with a Parasol – Madame Monet and Her Son =

1875 painting by Claude Monet

- La Femme à l'ombrelle — Madame Monet et son fils (French)
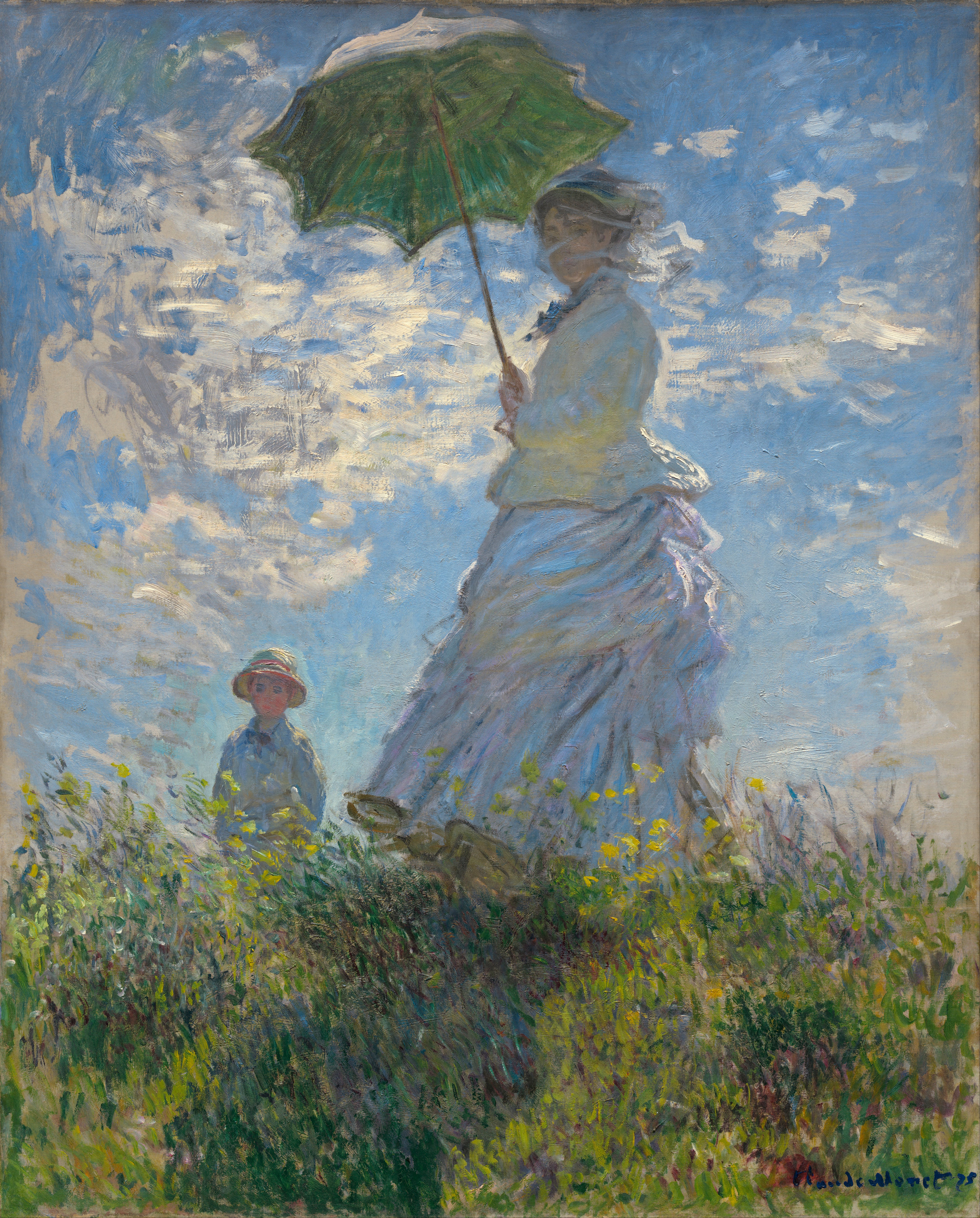
- Artist: Claude Monet
- Year: 1875
- Type: Oil
- Medium: Canvas
- Dimensions: 100 cm × 81 cm (39 in × 32 in)
- Location: National Gallery of Art; Washington, DC

Woman with a Parasol – Madame Monet and Her Son is an oil-on-canvas painting by Claude Monet from 1875. The Impressionist work depicts his wife Camille Monet and their son Jean Monet in the period from 1871 to 1877 while they were living in Argenteuil, capturing a moment on a stroll on a windy summer's day. Due to the subject matter, it is sometimes known as The Stroll (French: La Promenade) although the term "Promenade" is actually present in the titles of several other Monet paintings in the same series.

== Description ==
Monet's light, spontaneous brushwork creates splashes of colour. Mrs Monet's veil is blown by the wind, as is her billowing white dress; the waving grass of the meadow is echoed by the green underside of her parasol. She is seen as if from below, with a strong upward perspective, against fluffy white clouds in an azure sky. A boy, Monet's seven-year-old son Jean, is placed further away, concealed behind a rise in the ground and visible only from the waist up, creating a sense of depth, the moment using animated brush strokes full of vibrant color.

The work is a genre painting of an everyday family scene, not a formal portrait. The work was painted outdoors, en plein air, and quickly, probably in a single period of a few hours. It measures 100 × 81 centimetres (39 × 32 in), Monet's largest work in the 1870s, and is signed "Claude Monet 75" in the lower right corner.

== History ==
The painting was one of 18 works by Monet exhibited at the Second Impressionist Exhibition in April 1876, at the gallery of Paul Durand-Ruel. Ten years later, Monet returned to a similar subject, painting a pair of scenes featuring his second wife's daughter Suzanne Monet in 1886 with a parasol in a meadow at Giverny; they are in the Musée d'Orsay. John Singer Sargent saw the painting at the exhibition in 1876 and was later inspired to create a similar painting, Two Girls with Parasols at Fladbury, in 1889.

== Legacy ==
The painting is one of Monet's most recognizable and revered works and of impressionism as a whole. Mary Mathews Gedo, in Monet and His Muse: Camille Monet in the Artist's Life, said that it was of "high quality" and had a "powerful impact." artchive.com described it as a "masterpiece" that "triumphs wonderfully in conveying the sensation of a snapshot in time." Mary Tompkins Lewis, in Critical Readings in Impressionism and Post-Impressionism: An Anthology, said it was "his largest and most imposing" painting of the decade, as well as "haunting, deeply introspective." cmonetgallery.com viewed it as "representative of Monet and impressionism in many ways" and that "Monet was looking at the world and depicting it in way that had not been done before."

== Provenance ==
Monet sold the painting in November 1876 to Georges de Bellio, Monet's Homeopath, who was regularly paid in Monet's paintings. It was inherited by de Bellio's daughter Victorine and her husband Ernest Donop de Monchy, acquired by Georges Menier in Paris, and sold in 1965 to Paul Mellon and his wife Bunny Mellon. He donated the painting to the National Gallery of Art in Washington, DC, in 1983.

== Gallery ==
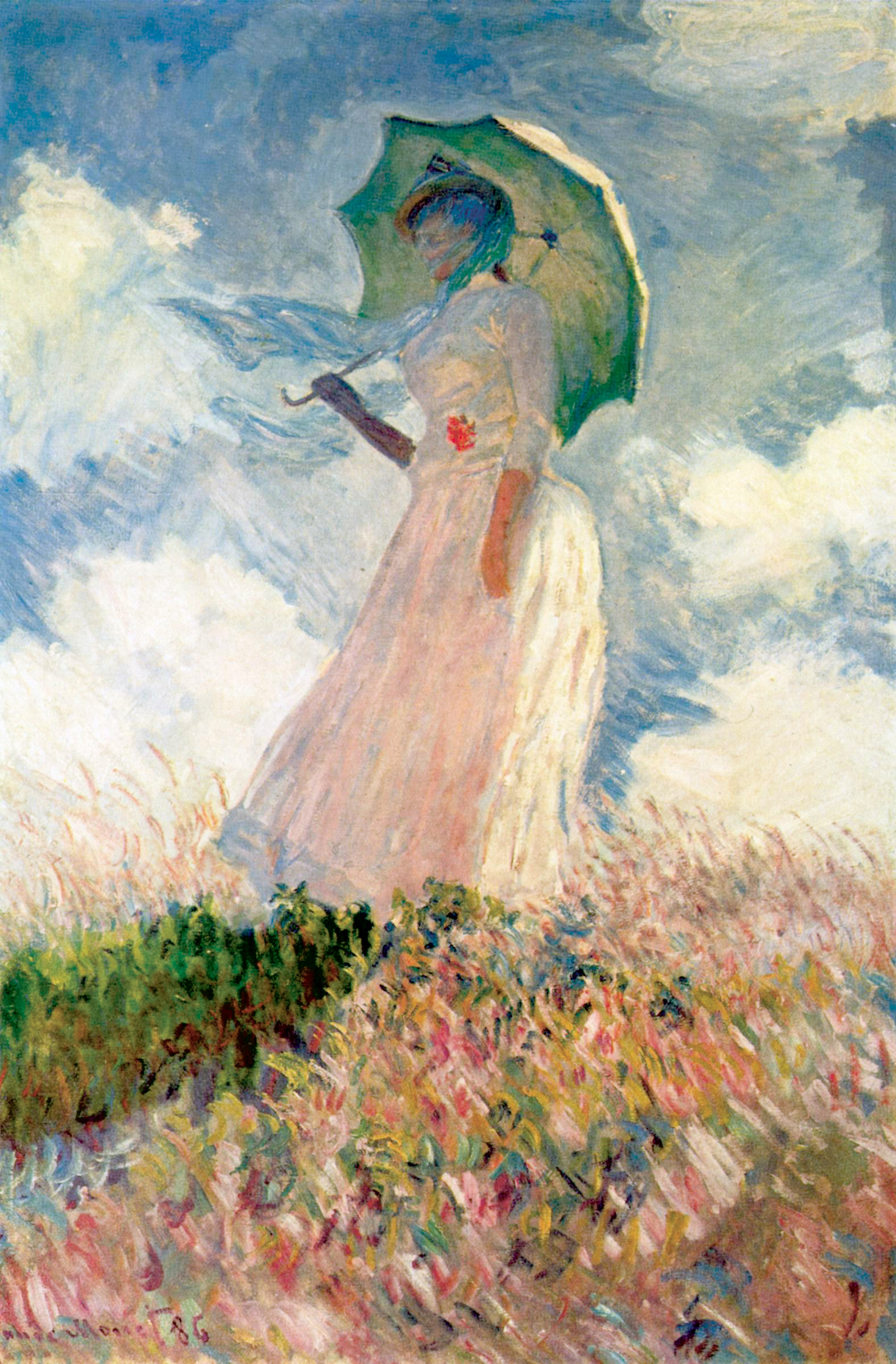
Monet, Woman with a Parasol, facing left, 1886

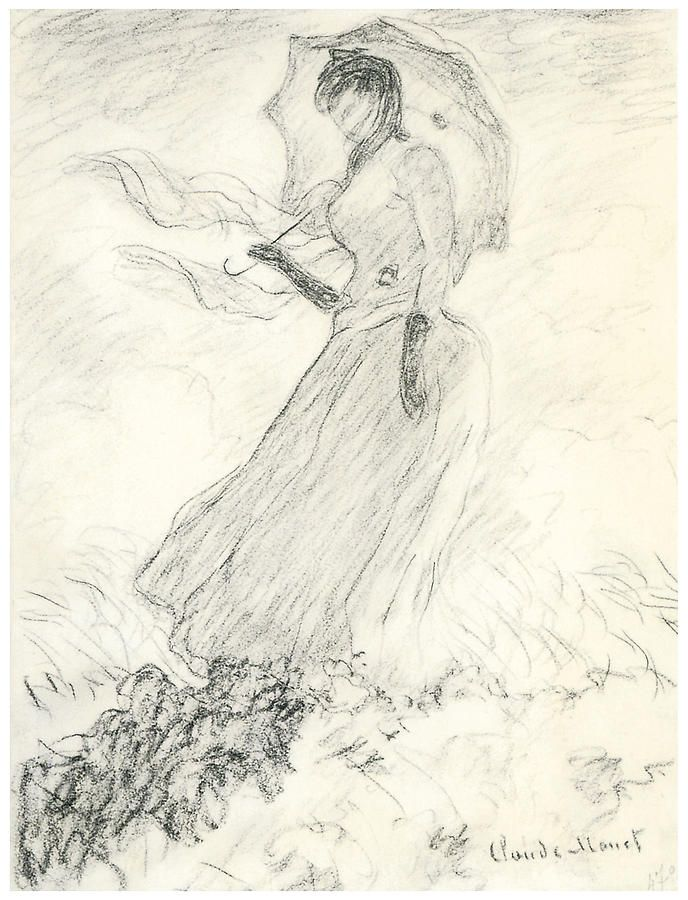
Sketch Drawing Of Woman with a Parasol, facing left, 1886

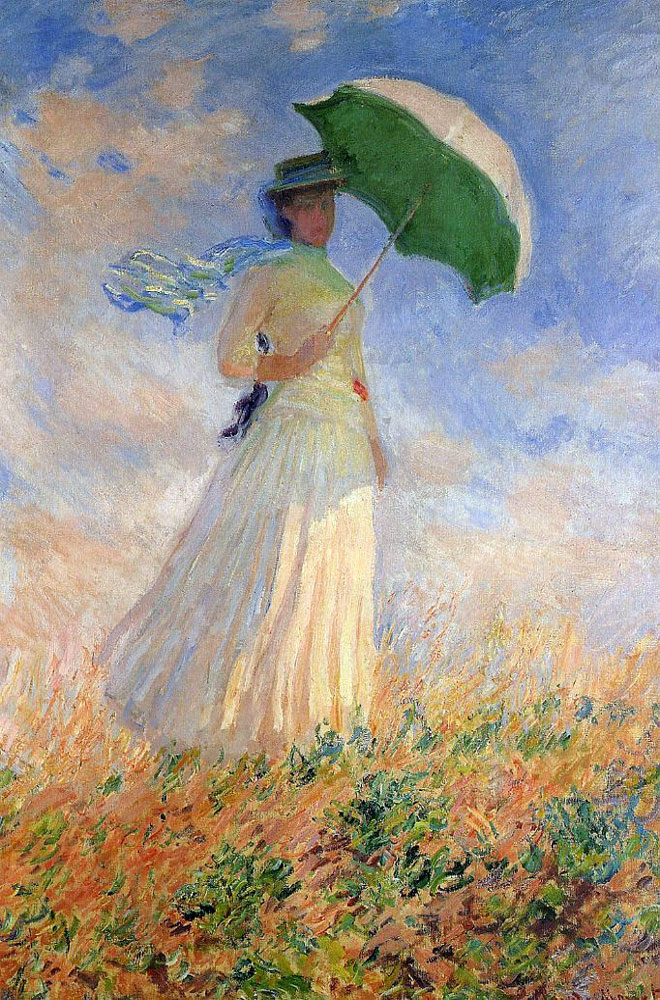
Monet, Woman with a Parasol, facing right, 1886

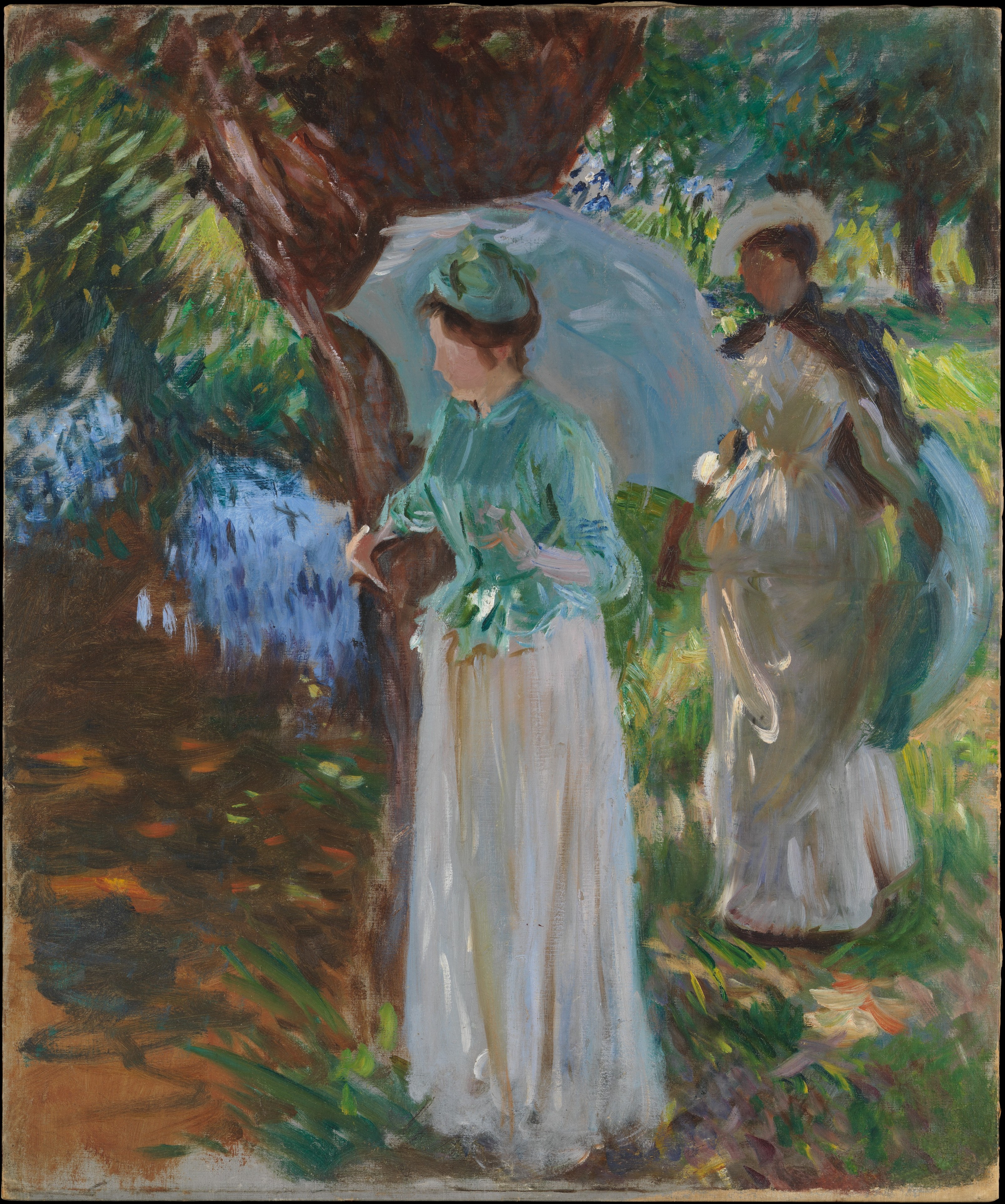
John Singer Sargent, Two Girls with Parasols at Fladbury, 1889

== See also ==
- List of paintings by Claude Monet
