= Anglers on the Seine at Poissy =

1872 painting by Claude Monet

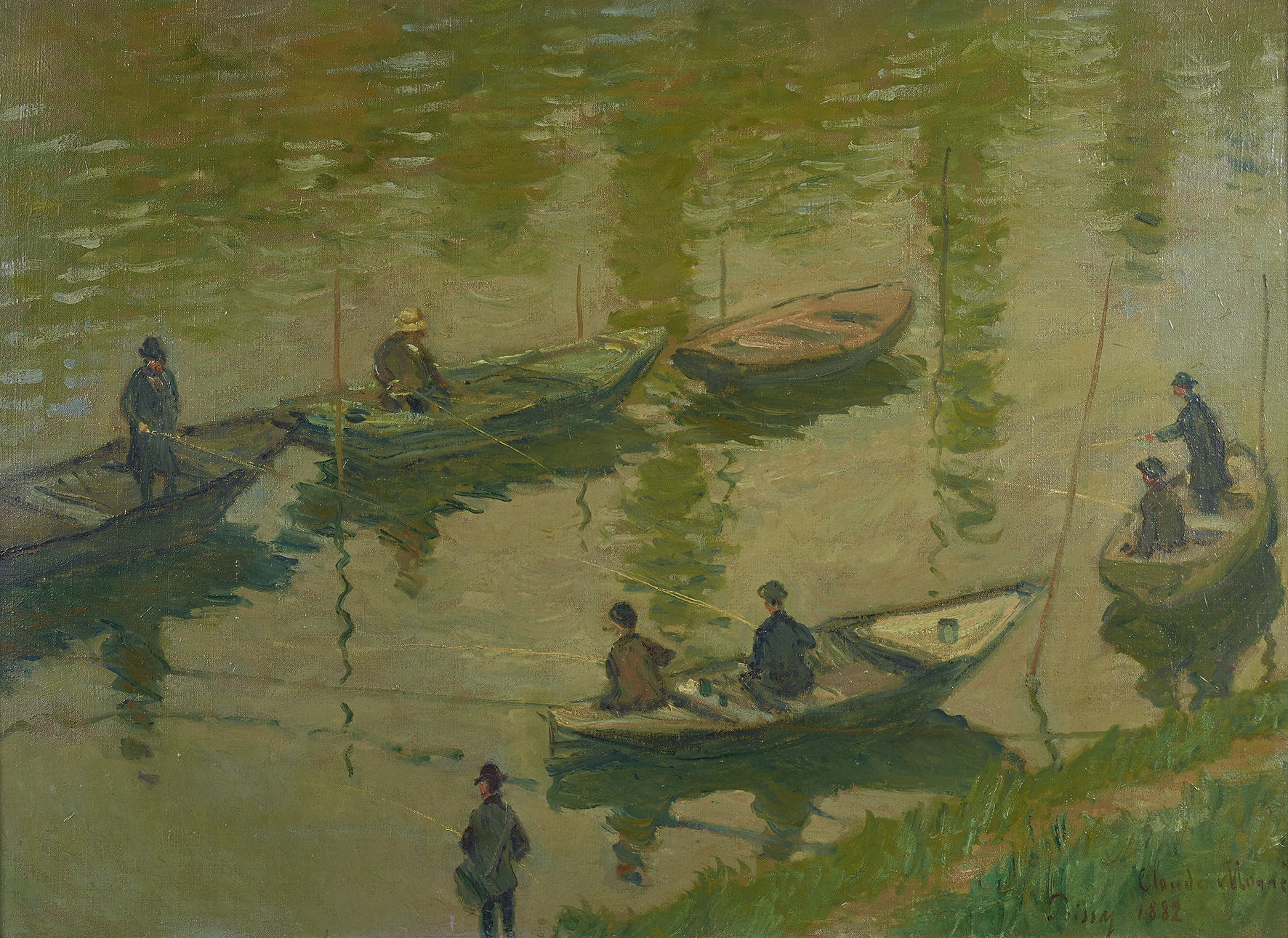
- Artist: Claude Monet
- Year: 1882
- Medium: Oil on canvas
- Dimensions: 60 cm × 81 cm (24 in × 32 in)
- Location: Schloss Belvedere; Vienna

Anglers on the Seine at Poissy (French: Pêcheurs dans la Seine à Poissy) is an 1882 painting by the French Impressionist Claude Monet. It was acquired in 1942 by the Kunsthistorisches Museum of Vienna but was later, as part of a reorganisation of their artwork, transferred to its current home in the Schloss Belvedere in the same city.

The work is one of only three images of Poissy, which lies some 25 km (16 mi) north-west of Paris, that Monet produced during the two years (December, 1881 to April, 1883) he lived there. With his companion Alice Hoschedé and their combined families, he occupied the capacious Villa Saint Louis overlooking his beloved River Seine, but nevertheless found the town offered him little of interest from an artistic point of view.

== See also ==
- List of paintings by Claude Monet
