= Suzanne Hoschedé =

French artists' model (1868–1899)

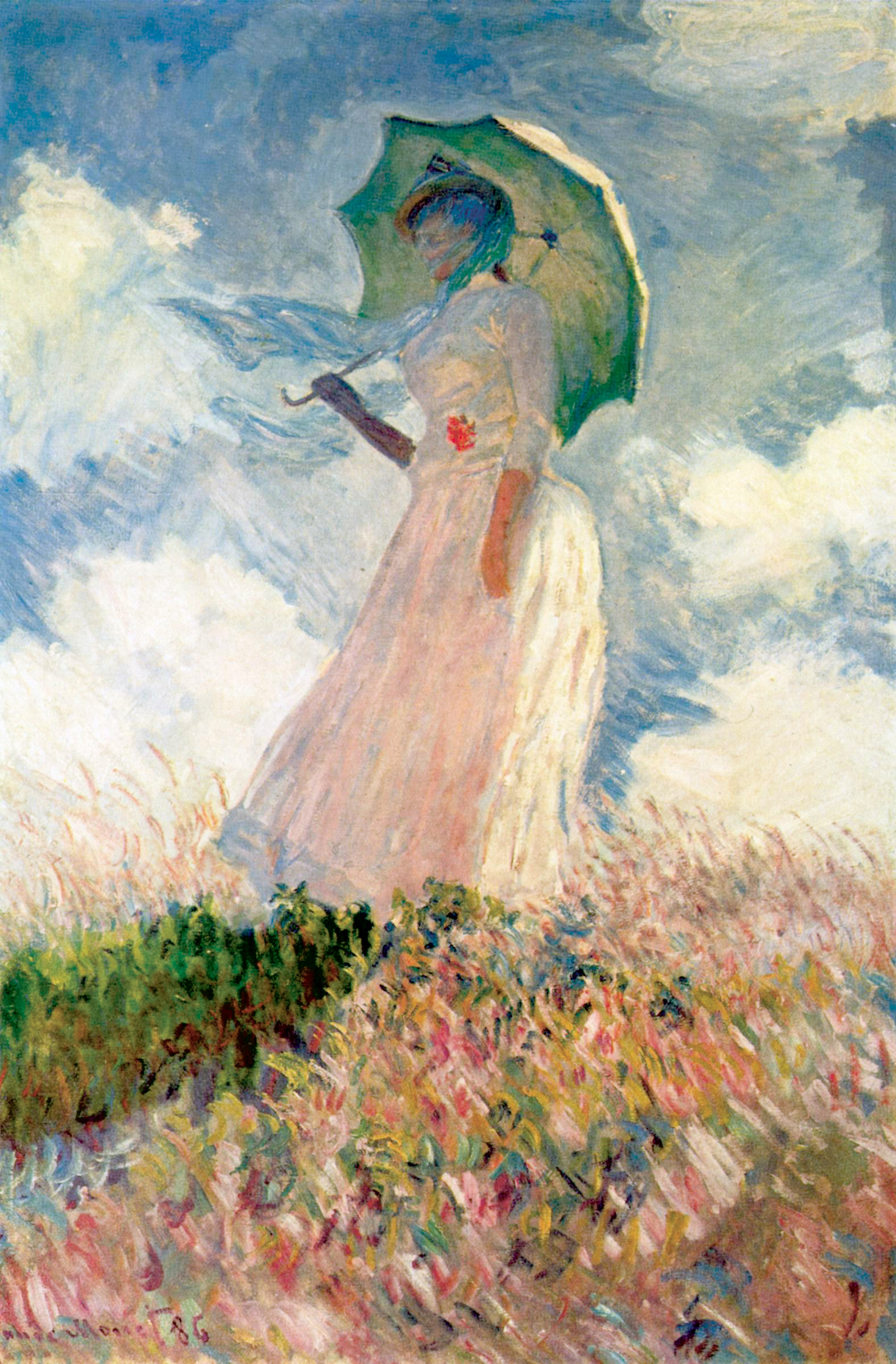
Claude Monet, The Woman with a Parasol, 1886. Suzanne Hoschedé posed for this and many other paintings by Monet.

Suzanne Hoschedé (April 29, 1868 – February 6, 1899) was one of the daughters of Alice Hoschedé and Ernest Hoschedé, the stepdaughter and favorite model of French impressionist painter Claude Monet, and wife of American impressionist painter Theodore Earl Butler. Suzanne is known as The Woman with a Parasol in Monet's painting of 1886.

== Early life ==
In 1878 Monet and his family temporarily moved into the home of Ernest Hoschedé (1837–1891), a wealthy department store owner and patron of the arts. Both families then shared a house in Vétheuil during the summer. Hoschedé became bankrupt, and left in 1878 for Belgium. After the death of Monet's wife Camille in September 1879, and while Monet continued to live in the house in Vétheuil, Hoschedé's wife Alice (1844–1911) helped Monet to raise his two sons, Jean and Michel, by taking them to Paris to live alongside her own six children. They were Blanche Hoschedé Monet (who eventually married Jean Monet); Germaine; Suzanne Hoschedé; Marthe; Jean-Pierre; and Jacques. In the spring of 1880, Alice Hoschedé and all the children left Paris and rejoined Monet, still living in the house in Vétheuil. In 1881, all of them moved to Poissy, which Monet hated. In April 1883, looking out the window of the little train between Vernon and Gasny, he discovered Giverny. They next moved to Vernon, then to a house in Giverny, Eure, in Upper Normandy, where he planted a large garden and where he painted for much of the rest of his life. Following the death of her estranged husband in 1891, Alice Hoschedé married Claude Monet in 1892 on July 16. The witnesses were the painters Gustave Caillebotte and Paul César Helleu.

=== Marriage ===
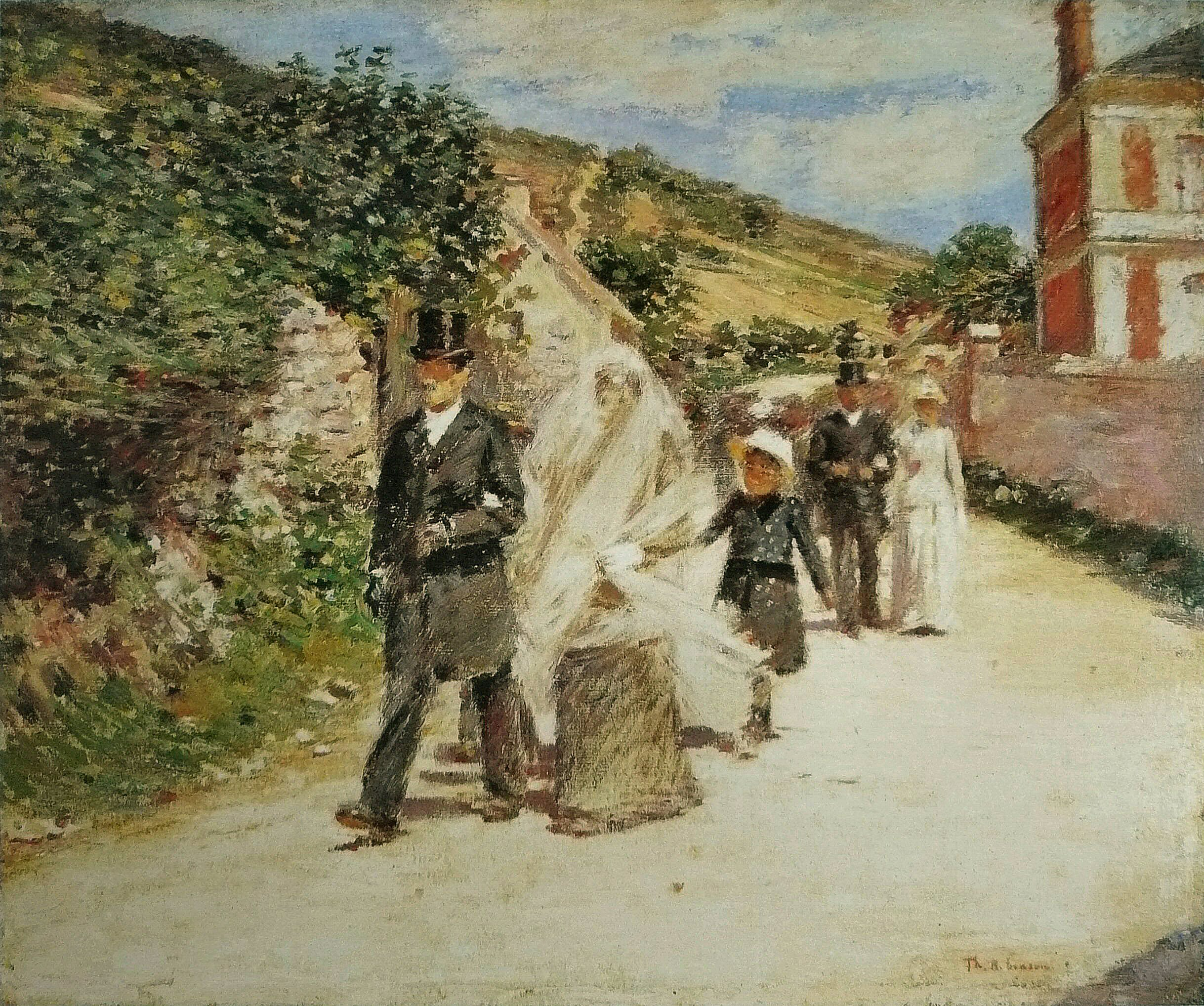
Theodore Robinson, The Wedding March, 1892. The wedding procession of Suzanne Hoschedé and Theodore Earl Butler.

Despite Claude Monet’s initial objections to his stepdaughter Suzanne Hoschedé's marriage to American painter Theodore Earl Butler (1861–1936), he relented after discovering the wealth of Butler’s family. The marriage occurred a few days after Monet’s wedding. Theodore Earl Butler married Suzanne Hoschedé on 20 July 1892. (Note: The event is described by Theodore Robinson in his diaries as a great day - The marriage of Butler and Mlle. Suzanne." Everybody nearly at the church - the peasants - many almost unrecognizable. Picard very fine, the wedding party in full dress – ceremony first at the mairie - then at the church. Monet entering first with Suzanne, then Butler and Mme. H (Hoschede). Considerable feeling on the part of the parents - a breakfast at the atelier – lasting most of the afternoon. Frequent showers, champagne and gaiety - … Dinner and evening at the Monets bride and groom left at 7.30 for the Paris train.)

The event was immortalized in a painting by Theodore Robinson titled The Wedding March. They had a son Jimmy Butler, born in 1893, and daughter Lilly Butler, who was born the following year. (Note: Theodore Butler became a key player and a link between the American colony of expatriate artists in France and Claude Monet. Butler painted a series of paintings of his own family, after his children were born. Most of those paintings were done indoors. They included series entitled The Bath, After the Bath, and Playing with Jimmy. Butler developed his own impressionist style with light palettes and loose brushstrokes, reminiscent of works done by Édouard Vuillard and Pierre Bonnard. From his garden he painted numerous landscapes showing the church of Giverny, The Demoiselles (small haystacks) and the grain stacks.)

== Death ==
After a lingering illness, Suzanne Hoschedé died on September 6, 1899. (Note: Thereafter most of Butler’s paintings were of landscapes. In 1899 Theodore Earl Butler decided to go back to the United States for a brief six month stay. He married Marthe Hoschedé in 1900.) Marthe Hoschedé, Suzanne’s youngest sister, helped Butler raise Jimmy and Lilly. Suzanne is buried in Giverny, in the Monet family grave beside the village church, together with her parents Alice and Ernest Hoschedé and her stepfather Claude Monet.
