= A Corner in the Garden at Montgeron =

Painting by Claude Monet

Corner of the Garden at Montgeron
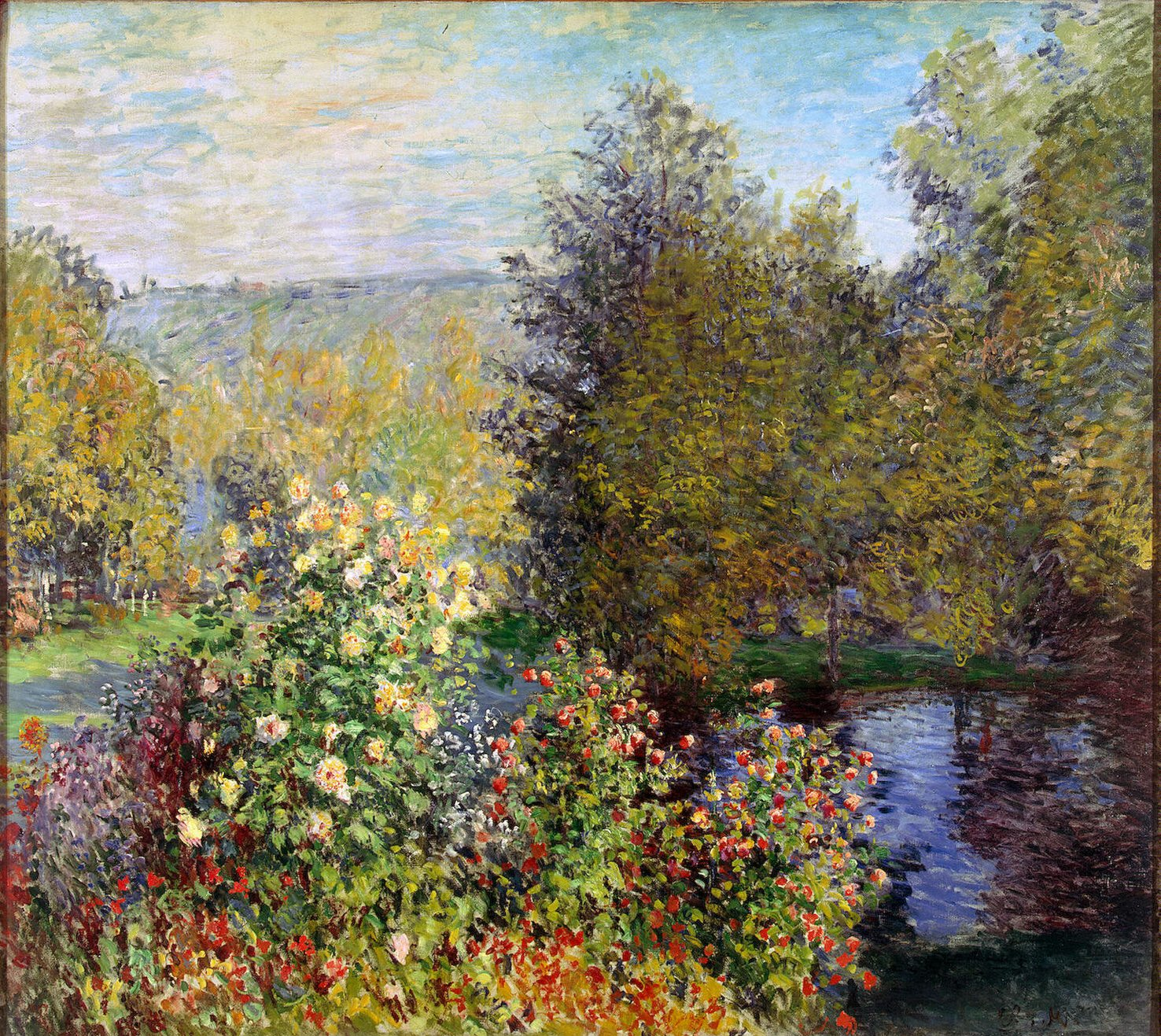
- Artist: Claude Monet
- Year: c. 1876
- Movement: Impressionism
- Dimensions: 175 cm × 194 cm (69 in × 76 in)
- Location: The State Hermitage Museum, St. Petersburg, Russia
- Accession: ГЭ-9152
- Website: www.hermitagemuseum.org/digital-collection/28485

A Corner in the Garden at Montgeron (FR: Coin de Jardin à Montgeron) is an oil on canvas painting by Claude Monet, from 1876. It is held in the Hermitage Museum, in Saint Petersburg.

It shows a flowering corner of the garden of the château de Rottembourg in Montgeron, near Paris, which then belonged to Ernest Hoschedé. He invited Monet that summer and autumn to paint 4 large canvases for his round living room.

The following year Hoschedé went bankrupt and because of that he never received the paintings, since the château was sold. Ivan Morozov bought the work in 1907 and ten years later it was seized by the Soviet state after the October Revolution.

== See also ==
- List of paintings by Claude Monet
- Other Monet paintings destined for the Château de Rottembourg's rotund salon are:
  - l'Étang à Montgeron (Lake at Montgeron), also part of the Hermitage Museum
  - Les Dindons (The Turkeys), now at Musée d'Orsay
  - L'Arrivée à Montgeron (The Arrival at Montgeron), private US collection
