= Ernest Hoschedé =

French businessman (1837–1891)

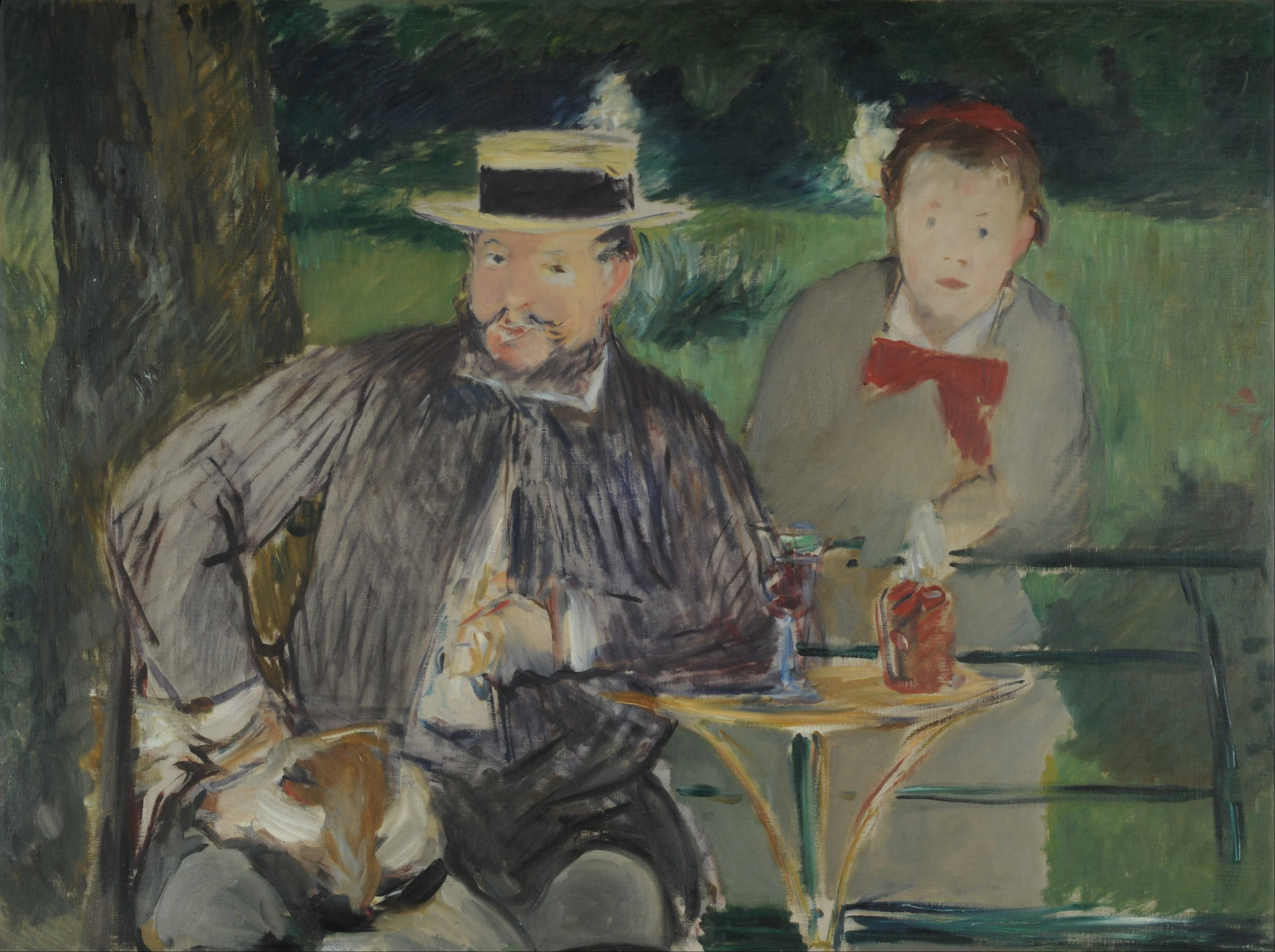
Édouard Manet, Ernest Hoschedé with his daughter Marthe, 1876, Museo Nacional de Bellas Artes, Buenos Aires

(Jean Louis) Ernest Hoschedé (Paris, 18 December 1837 – 19 March 1891) was a French department store magnate in Paris. Also during the successful period of his life, he was an art collector and critic. He lost his Impressionist art collection when he went bankrupt in 1877–1878. He moved his family into the home of Claude Monet in Vétheuil. He then lived in Paris and worked at Le Voltaire and then Magazine Français Illustré. His family continued to live with the Monets before and after his death. The year after his death, his wife Alice Hoschedé married Claude Monet, and was believed to have been Monet's mistress for years.

== Early life ==
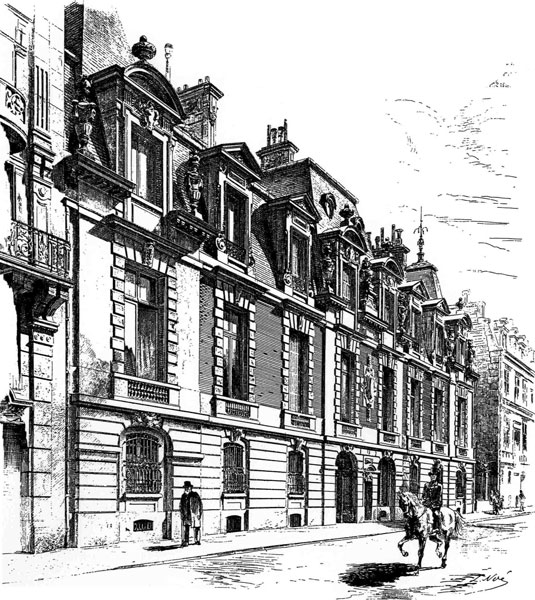
64 Rue de Lisbonne, Paris, 1878, Home of Ernest and Alice Hoschedé

Ernest Hoschedé was the son of a wealthy merchant of shawls and fine lace, Casimir Joseph Edouard Hoschedé, and his wife Eugenie Honorine Saintonge.

== Marriage ==
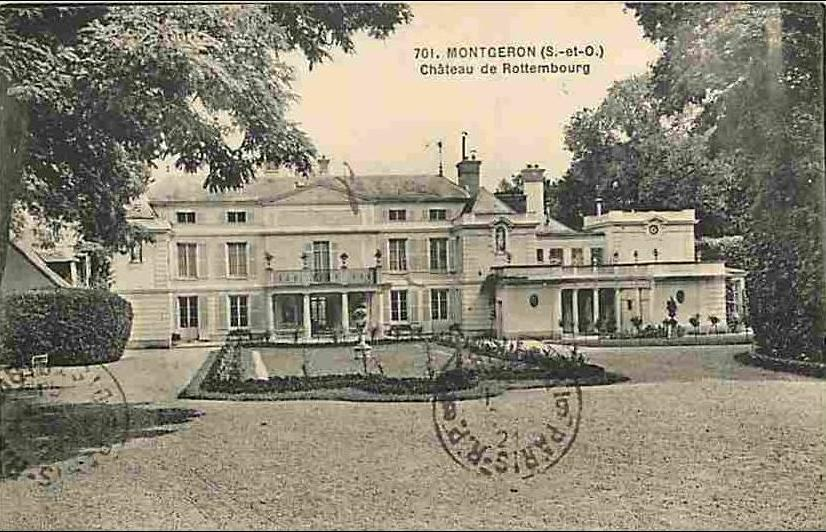
Château de Rottembourg (c. 1900)

Hoschedé married a Belgian woman, Alice Raingo, who was also from a wealthy family. They lived in Paris at 64 Rue de Lisbonne and had a place at Montgeron, southeast of Paris, Château de Rottembourg. They entertained lavishly at the Château, including hiring a train from Paris to transport guests.

== Career ==
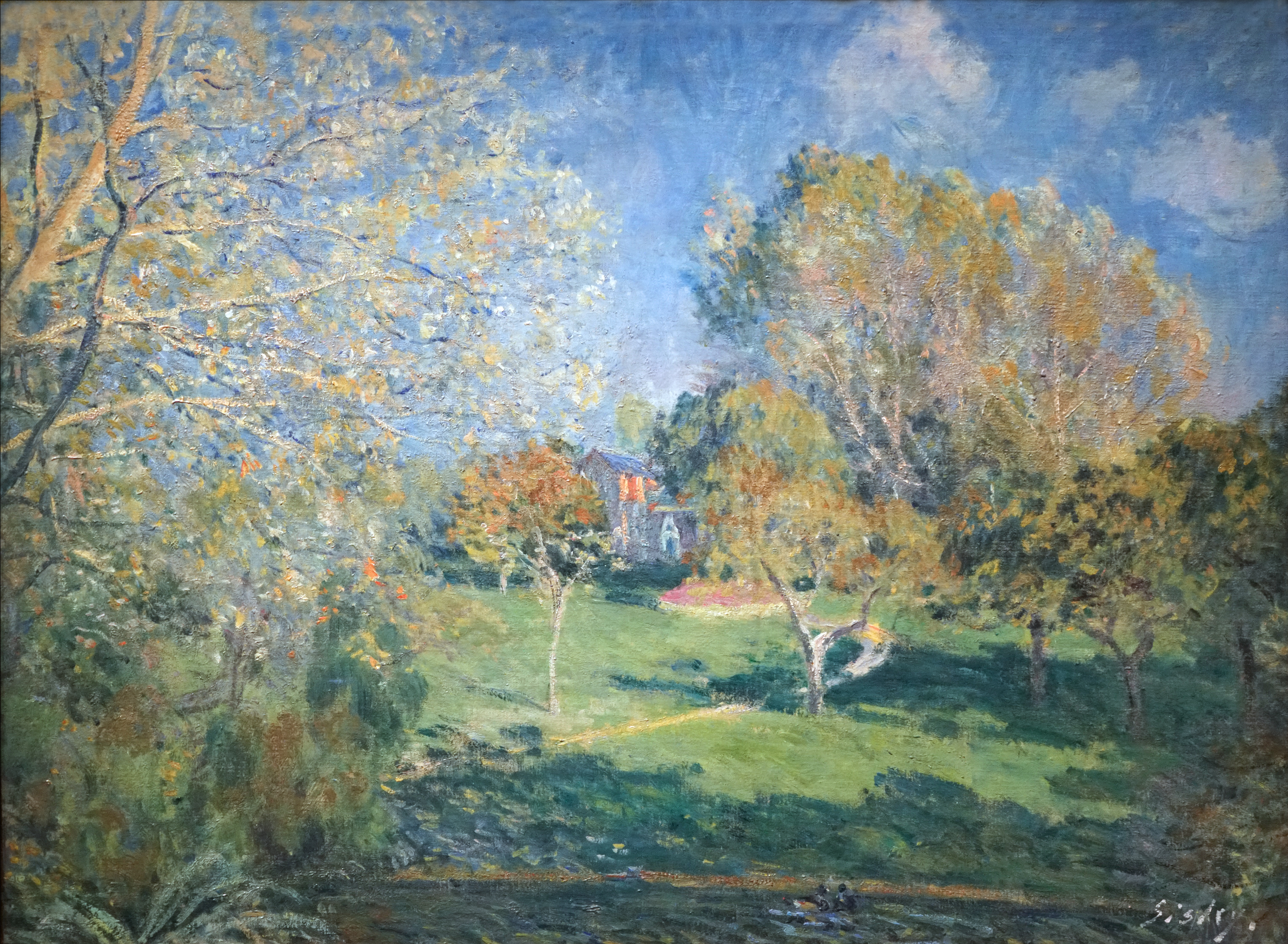
Alfred Sisley, Le Jardin de la Famille Hoschedé (The Garden of Hoschedé Family), 1881 - Collection Ivan Morozov, Pushkin Museum

Hoschedé was a Paris department store director, art critic, and art collector. He collected and sold the works of Claude Monet, Edgar Degas, Camille Pissarro and Alfred Sisley. He was best known as a patron of Claude Monet and other Impressionist painters. He also became good friends with Monet. In 1876, Hoschedé commissioned Monet to paint decorative panels for the Château de Rottembourg and several landscape paintings. According to the Nineteenth-century European Art: A Topical Dictionary, it may have been during this visit that Monet began a relationship with Alice Hoschedé and her youngest son, Jean-Pierre, may have been fathered by Monet.

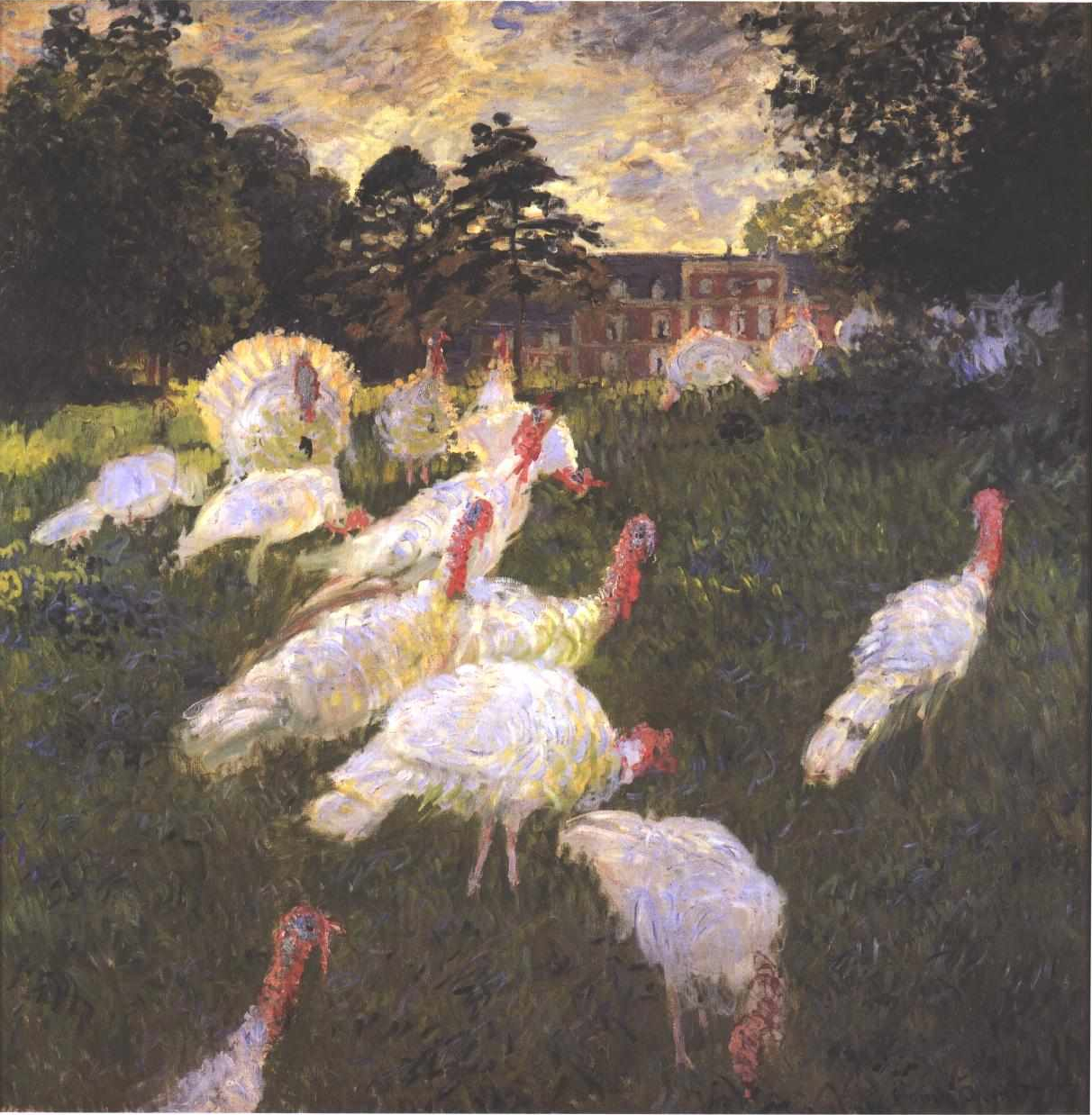
"Les Dindons" ("The Turkeys"), painted by Claude Monet in 1877, was one of four paintings commissioned by Ernest Hoschedé to adorn the salon of his Château de Rottembourg. Now in the Musée d'Orsay.

Hoschedé lived an "extravagant lifestyle" and became bankrupt in 1877. For a period of time Hoschedé went to Belgium to escape his creditors. His art collection was auctioned off in June 1878 for a fraction of its value. This was a blow to the Impressionists, especially Monet. Although stunned by Hoschedé's financial failure, Monet was "swift to offer his support", inviting the Hoschedés to live with him and his family.

== Life with the Monets ==
Hoschedé, his wife and their children moved into a house in Vétheuil with Monet, Monet's ailing first wife Camille, and the Monet's two sons Jean and Michel. Needing a bigger home for the 12 member Monet and Hoschedé families and the Monet's servants, they moved into a larger house on the road from Vétheuil to La Roche-Guyon.

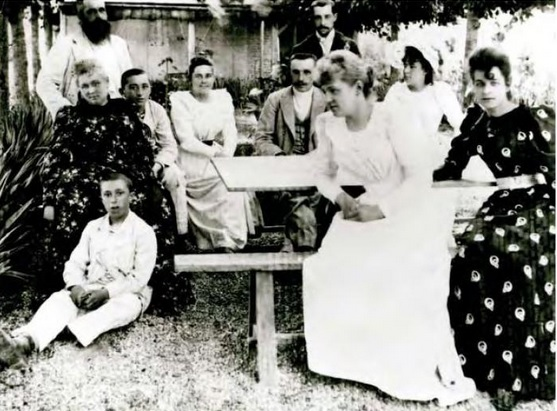
The Monet and Hoschedé families c. 1880 from left to right: Claude Monet, Alice Hoschedé, Jean-Pierre Hoschedé, Jacques Hoschedé, Blanche Hoschedé Monet, Jean Monet, Michel Monet, Martha Hoschedé, Germaine Hoschedé, Suzanne Hoschedé

== Paris ==
Hoschedé spent most of his time in Paris, having found employment at Le Voltaire newspaper. He kept his family in Vétheuil where it was cheaper to live. After Camille Monet's death in 1879, Monet and Alice (along with the children from the two respective families) continued living together at Poissy and later at Giverny.

He worked then at the Magazine Français Illustré as an art editor. Hoschedé developed a severe case of gout in early 1891 after years of overeating and drinking. As his illness became more severe, Alice came to Paris to care for him.

== Death ==
Ernest Hoschedé died in 1891 a poor man. His funeral and burial, which were held at Giverny at his children's request, were paid for by Monet.

The following year Alice married Claude Monet.

== See also ==
- Claude Monet
- Blanche Hoschedé Monet
