= Michel Monet =

Son of Claude Monet (1878–1966)

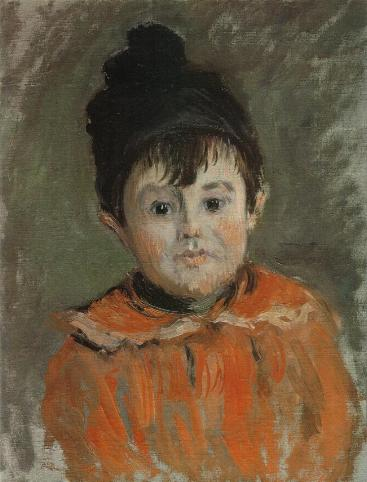
Michel Monet au bonnet à pompon. Oil on canvas, Claude Monet, 1880, Musée Marmottan Monet, Paris

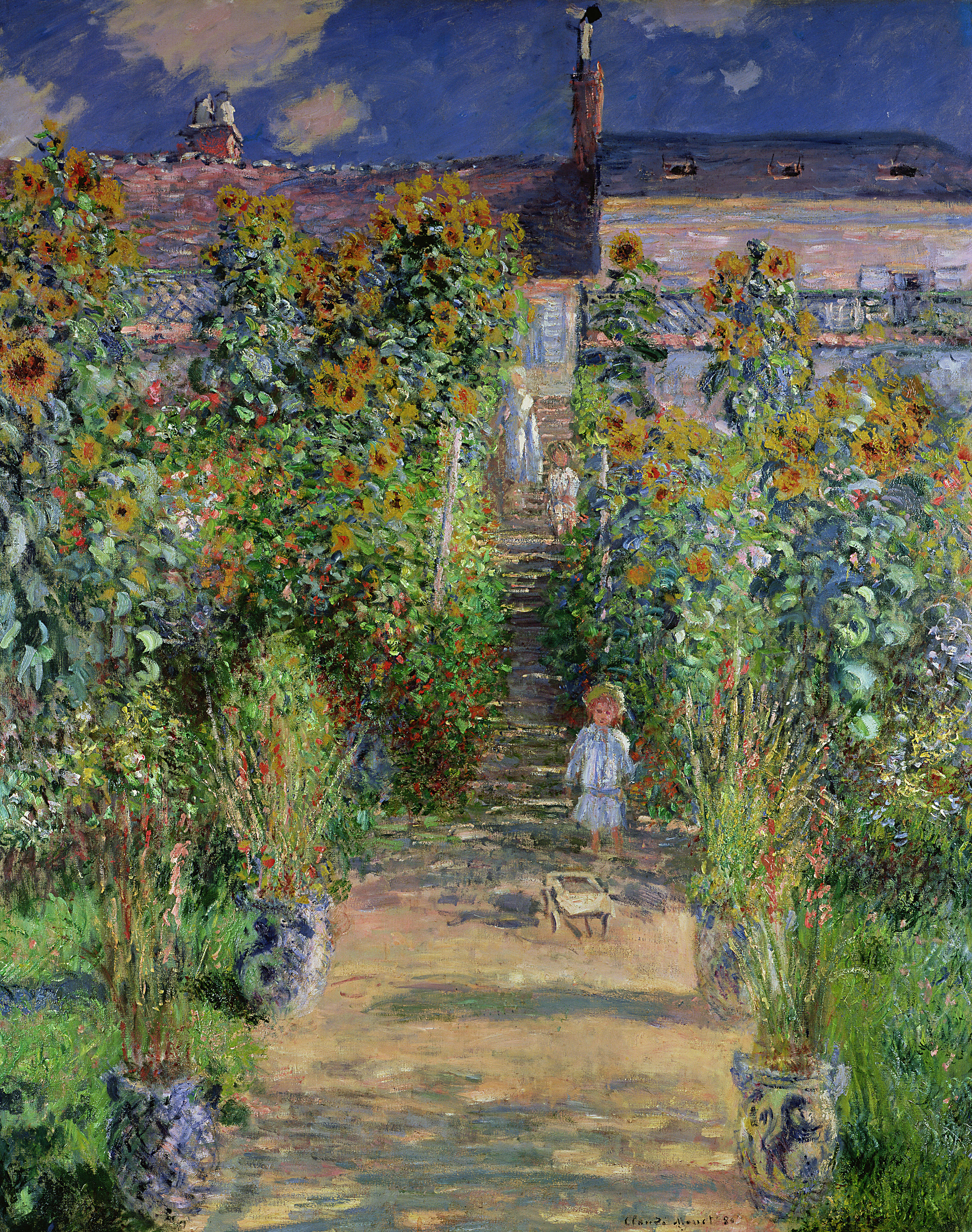
Le jardin de Monet à Vétheuil, with Michel Monet and Jean-Pierre Hoschedé. Oil on canvas, Claude Monet, 1880. National Gallery of Art, Washington

Michel Monet (French pronunciation: [miʃɛl mɔnɛ]; 17 March 1878 – 3 February 1966) was the second son of Claude Monet and Camille Doncieux-Monet.

== Early life ==
Born on 17 March 1878, 26 rue d'Édimbourg, in the 8th arrondissement of Paris, where the Monets had moved from Argenteuil, Michel Monet was the younger of Claude and Camille Monet's two sons. His mother's already failing health worsened after his birth and she died on 5 September 1879, probably of uterine cancer. Michel's elder brother, Jean, was born in 1867.

Since 1877, year of Ernest Hoschedé's bankruptcy, Alice Hoschedé and her six children had been living with the Monets. The two families moved from Paris to Vétheuil in August 1878 and after Camille's death in 1879, Monet, Alice and the eight children continued living together. In 1881, they moved to Poissy and in April 1883 to Giverny. Alice managed the household and supervised the education of the Monet and Hoschedé children.

== Paintings by Claude Monet that include Michel ==
- Michel Monet au bonnet à pompom ("Portrait of Michel in a Pompom Hat"), 1880, currently at (Musée Marmottan Monet, Paris).
- Le jardin de Monet à Vétheuil ("Monet's garden at Vétheuil"), 1880, Michel Monet and Jean-Pierre Hoschedé, with Alice Hoschedé in background. Currently at (National Gallery of Art, Washington, D.C.).
- Jean-Pierre Hoschedé et Michel Monet au bord de l'Epte, 1890, currently at National Gallery of Canada.

== World War I ==
Michel Monet and his step-brother Jean-Pierre Hoschedé served in the French Army during World War I.

== Marriage ==
Michel Monet married Gabrielle Bonaventure in 1927. The couple had no children. Gabrielle died 2 February 1964.

== Claude Monet estate ==
When Claude Monet died in 1926, as his sole heir, Michel inherited the entire estate. Michel never spent time in Giverny and Blanche Hoschedé Monet, his stepsister and sister-in-law, became the caretaker of the house and garden until her death in 1947. Louis Lebret, who had been Monet's head gardener, stayed on to help Blanche. After her death the garden was neglected.

== Death ==
Michel Monet, a car enthusiast, died in a car crash in nearby Vernon on 3 February 1966, at the age of 87, a month before his 88th birthday. He had bequeathed the estate to the Académie des beaux-arts. From 1977 onwards, Gérald Van der Kemp, then curator at the Château de Versailles, played a key role in the restoration of Claude Monet's house and gardens, which had been left in a desolate state. In a bid to raise funds, he and his wife Florence appealed to American donors through the "Versailles Foundation-Giverny Inc."

In 1966, Michel Monet had left to the Musée Marmottan Monet his own collection of his father's work, thus creating the world's largest collection of Monet paintings.

Michel Monet is buried in Claude Monet's vault in the Giverny cemetery, which adjoins the village Sainte Radegonde church.
