= Manet (disambiguation) =

Édouard Manet (1832–1883) was a French painter.

Manet may also refer to:

== People with the surname Manet ==
- Eduardo Manet,
- Eugène Manet (1833–1892), French painter, brother of Édouard Manet
- Jeanne Manet (1917–2012), French film actress
- Julie Manet (1878–1966), French painter, niece of Édouard Manet
- Raghunath Manet, Indian classical musician and dancer
- Suzanne Manet,

== MANET as an acronym ==
- Mobile ad hoc network, a self-configuring mobile wireless network
- MANET database or Molecular Ancestry Network, bioinformatics database

== Other ==
- Manet - motorcycles and mopeds from Slovakia
- Hun Manet - Cambodian prime minister
