= L'Enfant a la tasse =

1868 oil painting by Claude Monet

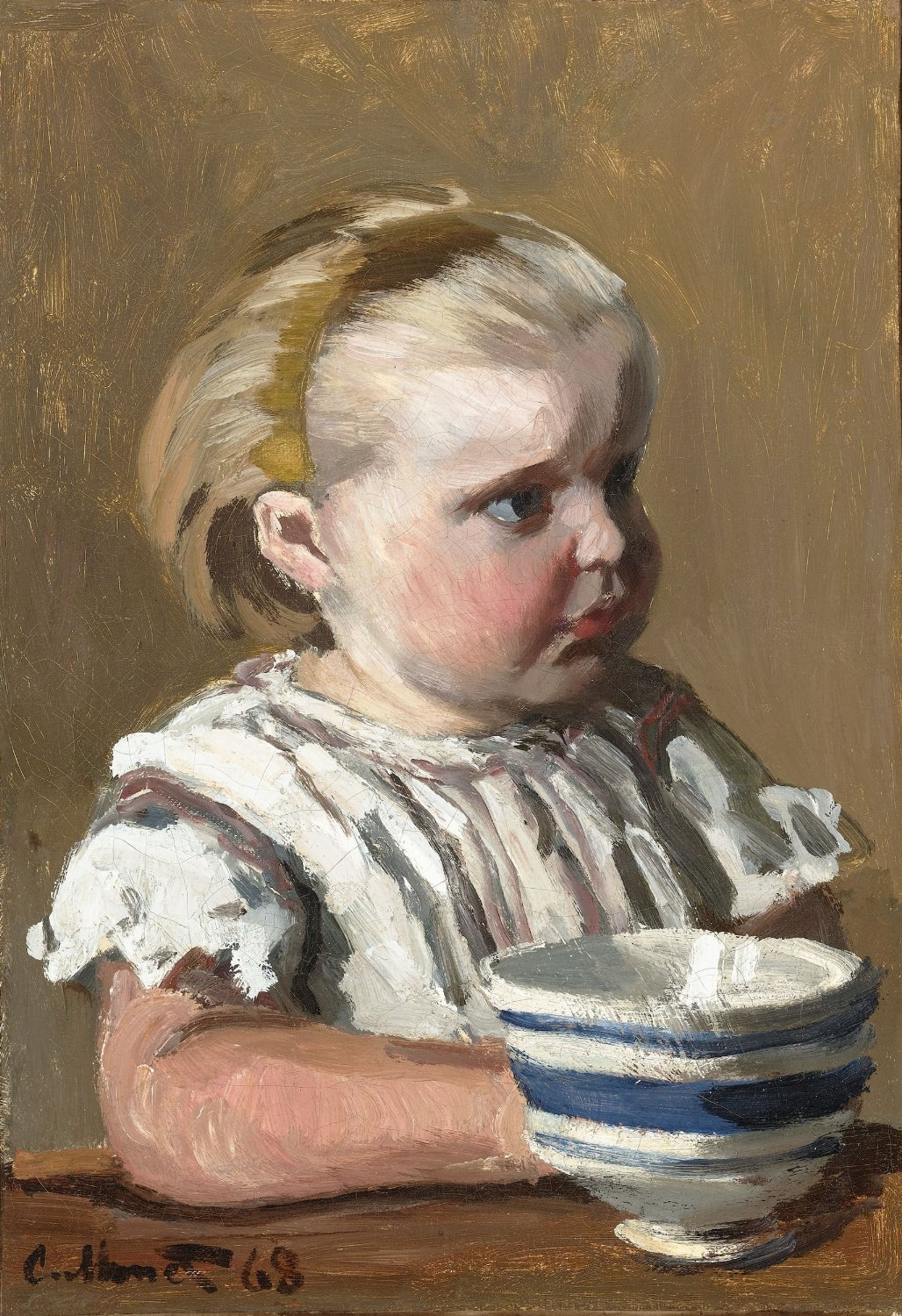
- Artist: Claude Monet
- Year: 1868
- Type: Oil painting
- Dimensions: 46 cm × 33 cm (18 in × 13 in)

L'Enfant a la tasse or L'Enfant a la tasse, portrait de Jean Monet is an oil painting by Impressionist Claude Monet created in 1868. The painting – which features Monet's son Jean sitting next to a white and blue striped cup – is Monet's third painting to feature his son. The painting was first owned by a friend of Monet in Le Havre, who returned it to Monet in 1883. It has been exhibited at the Albertina in Vienna in 2018, as part of a major exhibition of Monet’s body of work. The retrospective was titled “Claude Monet - A Floating World”. Daniel Wildenstein’s Catalogue raisonné, 1996, Vol II mentions this work, under No 131.

== 2013 sale ==
The painting was listed on Amazon.com for sale at US$1.45 million as part of its "fine art" initiative in August 2013. Economist Tyler Cowen criticized the Amazon for its initiative saying it "looks like dealers trying to unload unwanted, hard to sell inventory" referring to the many cheap lithographs (a kind of copies) offered at the platform at that time, in stark contrast to this Monet, which is an important original.

== See also ==
- List of paintings by Claude Monet
