= Moneta (name) =

Moneta is a given name and surname that may refer to

Given name

- Moneta Sleet Jr. (1926–1996), African-American photographer, Pulitzer Prize winner

Surname

- Claudio Moneta (born 1967), Italian voice actor
- Ernesto Teodoro Moneta (1833–1918), Italian journalist and international activist, nobel peace prize winner
- Juno Moneta, ancient Roman goddess
- Łukasz Moneta (born 1994), Polish footballer
- Marcos Moneta (born 2000), Argentine rugby player
- Tullio Moneta, South African actor
- Moneta family, a 15th-century noble family
