= Blanche Hoschedé Monet =

French painter (1865–1947)

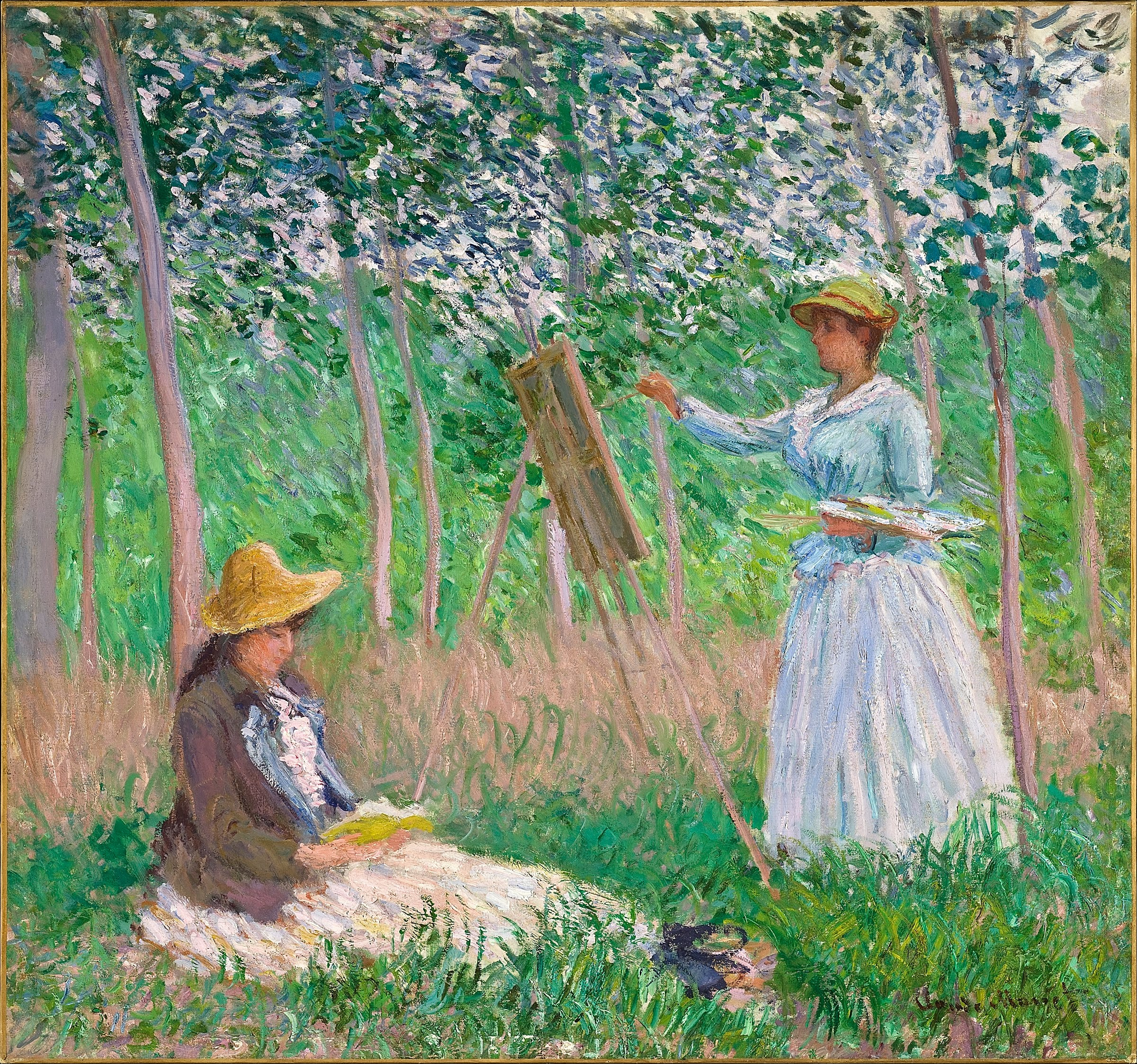
- Claude Monet, In the Woods at Giverny: Blanche Hoschedé at Her Easel with Suzanne Hoschedé Reading, 1887, Los Angeles County Museum of Art
- Born: 10 November 1865; Paris, France
- Died: 8 December 1947 (aged 82); Nice, France
- Known for: Stepdaughter and daughter-in-law of Claude Monet
- Spouse: Jean Monet (m. 1897)
- Parent(s): Ernest Hoschedé; Alice Hoschedé

Blanche Hoschedé Monet (10 November 1865 – 8 December 1947) was a French painter who was both the stepdaughter and the daughter-in-law of Claude Monet.

== Early life ==
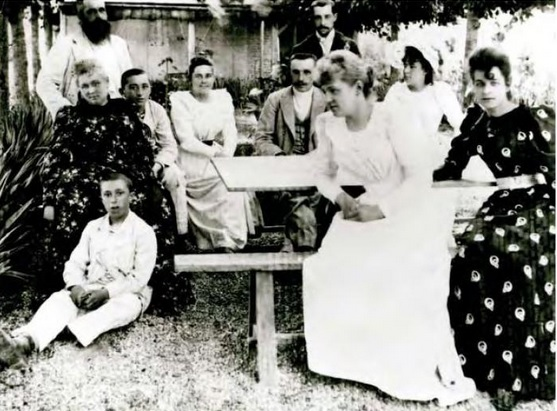
The Monet and Hoschedé families c. 1880 from left to right: Claude Monet, Alice Monet, Jean-Pierre Hoschedé, Jacques Hoschedé, Blanche Hoschedé, Jean Monet, Michel Monet, Martha Hoschedé, Germaine Hoschedé, Suzanne Hoschedé

=== Ernest and Alice Hoschedé ===
Blanche Hoschedé was born in Paris, the second daughter of Ernest Hoschedé and Alice Hoschedé. Ernest was a businessman, a department store magnate in Paris. He collected impressionist paintings and was an important patron to Claude Monet early in his career. In 1876, Ernest commissioned Claude to paint decorative panels in the round drawing room in his residence, the château de Rottembourg, in Montgeron. In 1877, Ernest went bankrupt and his art collection was auctioned off.

=== Life with the Monets ===
In the autumn of 1878, Ernest Hoschedé, his wife Alice, and their six children moved into a house in Vétheuil, as did Monet, his wife Camille, and their two sons, Jean and the infant Michel. Ernest, however, still spent most of his time in Paris, and eventually went to Belgium. After the death of Camille in Vétheuil on 5 September 1879, Alice and her children continued living with Monet. In 1881, they moved to Poissy, and finally settled in their home in Giverny in 1883. Although Ernest and Alice Hoschedé never divorced, Claude Monet and Alice went on living together until after the death of Ernest in 1891. Claude Monet and Alice Hoschedé were married on 16 July 1892.

== Education ==
The only child in the Hoschedé-Monet household to become interested in art, Blanche began painting at the age of eleven and developed a fond relationship with Claude Monet. She visited his studio as well as Édouard Manet's. By the time she was 17 years old, she was Monet's assistant and only student, often painting en plein air alongside him, painting the same subject with the same colors.

Blanche also painted alongside American expatriates Theodore Earl Butler and John Leslie Breck. Monet stopped the romance that had developed between Blanche and Breck, while he allowed Butler to marry Blanche's sister, Suzanne Hoschedé, in 1892.

The art dealer Paul Durand-Ruel purchased a Haystack painting by Blanche, and it currently is displayed in Monet's house in Giverny. In January 1888, while in Antibes, Monet encouraged Blanche to submit a work to the Salon.

== Jean and Claude Monet ==
Blanche married Claude Monet's eldest son, Jean Monet, in 1897. The couple lived in Rouen, where Jean worked as a chemist for his uncle Léon Monet, and until 1913 in Beaumont-le-Roger.

Her mother, Alice, died on 19 May 1911, and Jean on 10 February 1914, after a long illness. (Note: The Metropolitan Museum of Art stated that he died in 1913.) Overcome with grief, Claude Monet suffered from depression and, from that point on, Blanche took over her father-in-law's household. She watched over him as his eyesight was failing him to the point he believed he was going blind. Georges Clemenceau, their common friend, called her Monet's "Blue Angel". After Monet's death on 5 December 1926, and for twenty years until her own in 1947, she took on the responsibility of the house and gardens at Giverny. She died in Nice, aged 82. She is buried in Giverny, in the Monet family grave beside the village church, with Claude Monet, her mother Alice and her husband Jean.

== Career ==
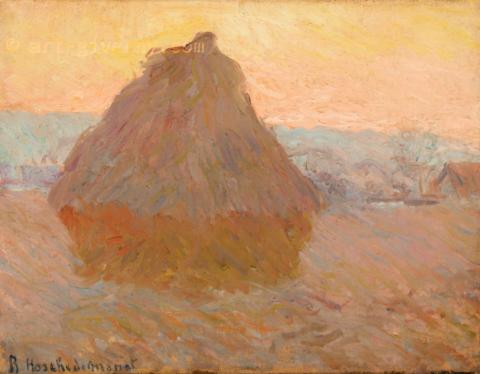
Blanche Hoschedé Monet, Grainstack or Haystack, 1889

Most of Blanche's works were done in Giverny from 1883 to 1897, which was similar to that of Monet's work, and around Rouen. She "adopted an almost pure form of impressionism."

She painted landscapes with trees such as pines and poplars, and meadows along the Risle river. In the 1920s, she also painted on several occasions at Georges Clemenceau's property in Saint-Vincent-sur-Jard (Vendée department) in the west of France, where she made paintings of the garden, house and the Atlantic Ocean. After Monet's death, she remained in Giverny and continued painting. Recognizing her body of work, a street bears her name in the village of Giverny.

Dr. Janine Burke believes that Blanche may have assisted Monet in the painting of the Grandes Décorations. Monet had trained and encouraged Blanche as an artist. In a chapter on Blanche and Monet in Source: Nature's Healing Role in Art and Writing (2009), Burke comments, "Given the sheer scale of the surfaces to be covered in the Grandes Décorations, it is logical to consider Monet had an assistant, and who better than Blanche?"

== Gallery ==
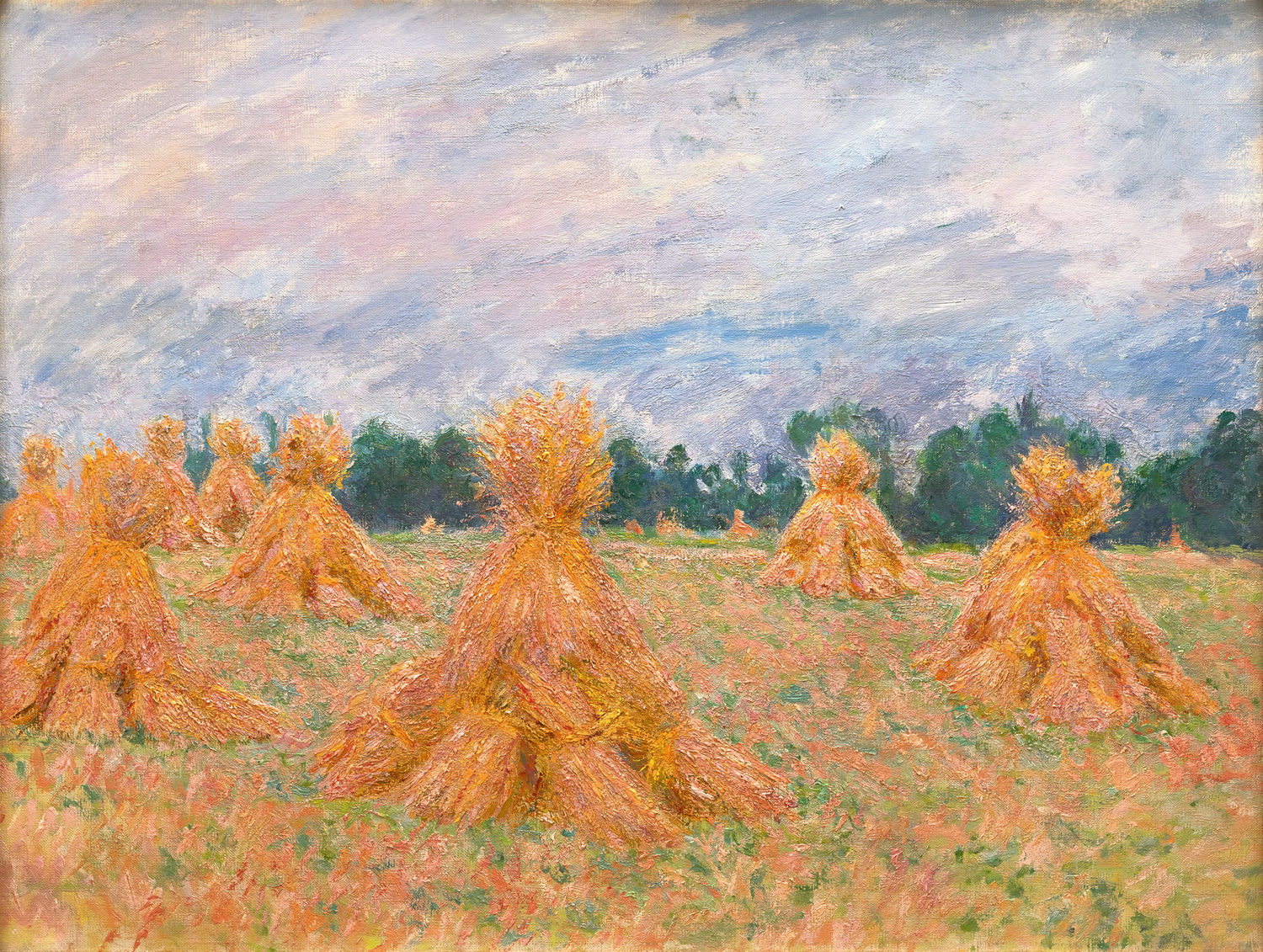
La Moisson ("The Harvest") by Blanche Hoschedé Monet. Circa 1885. Oil on canvas. Private collection.

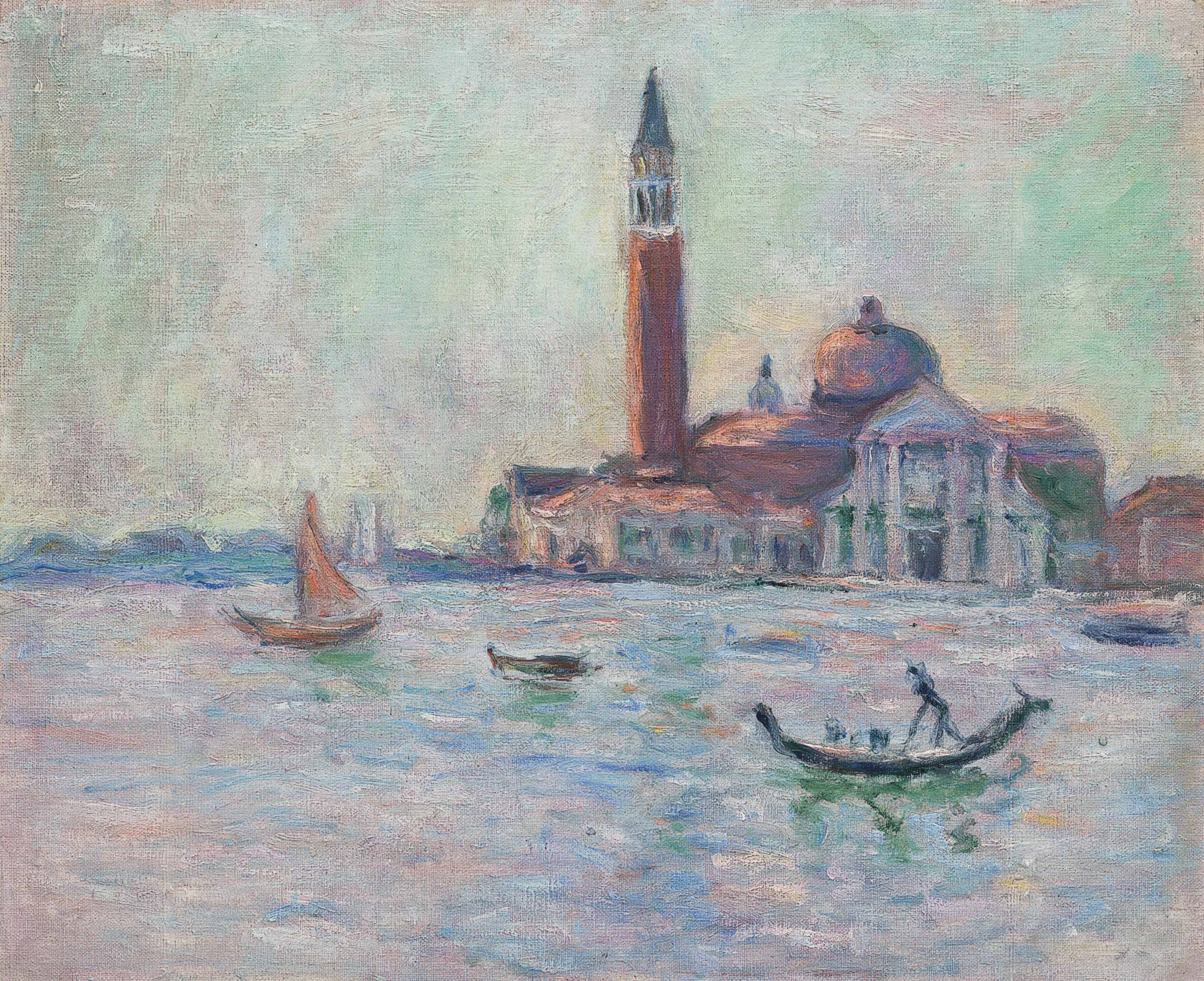
Venise, la Salute by Blanche Hoschedé Monet. Private collection.

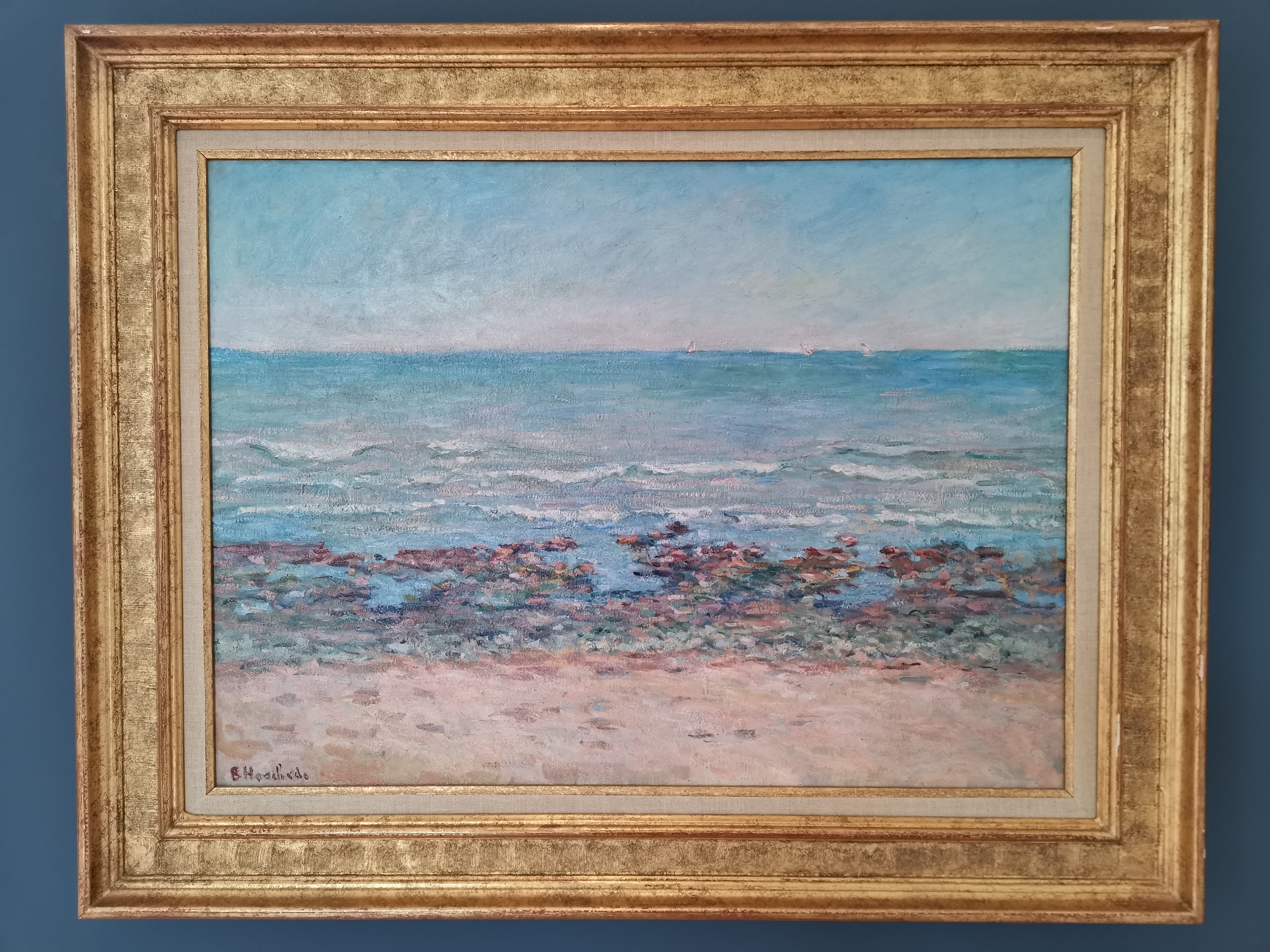
Plage de la côte normande ("Beach on the Normandy Coast") by Blanche Hoschedé Monet. Early 20th century. Oil on canvas. Musée Alphonse-Georges-Poulain.

== Exhibitions ==
=== Solo exhibitions ===
- 1927 - Galerie Bernheim-Jeune, Paris: Blanche Hoschedé (7–18 November 1927)
- 1931 - Galerie Bernheim-Jeune, Paris: Blanche Hoschedé Monet (9–20 March 1931)
- 1942 - Galerie Daber, Paris: Blanche Hoschedé (16 October - 7 November 1942)
- 1947 - Galerie d'art Drouot Provence, Paris: Blanche Hoschedé Monet (14 March - 14 April 1947)

=== Group exhibitions ===
- Many times between 1905 and 1954 - Salon des Indépendants
- Many times between 1907 and 1935 - Salon de la Société des Artistes Rouennais
- 1954 - Galerie Zak, Paris, 19 November - 3 December 1954.
- 1928 - Galerie Georges Petit, Catalogue des œuvres importantes Camille Pissarro et de tableaux, pastels, aquarelles, dessins, gouaches par Mary Cassatt, Cézanne, Édouard Dufeu, Delacroix, Guillaumin, Blanche Hoschedé, Jongkind, Le Bail, Luce, Manet, Claude Monet, Piette, Seurat, Signac, Sisley, van Rysselberghe, etc..
- 1957 - Vernon, Blanche-Hoschedé-Monet
- 1959 - Musée des Beaux-Arts de Rouen: Blanche Hoschedé Monet, Henry Ottman
- 1960 - Charles E. Slatkin Galleries, New York: Claude Monet and the Giverny Artists
- 1988 - Modern Art Museum Ibaraki, Kyoto, Fukushima: Monet and his Friends
- 1991 - AG Poulain, Vernon: Blanche Hoschedé Monet

== Collections ==
Blanche Hoschedé Monet's works are in the following museums:

- Toulouse-Lautrec Museum, Albi: Port de Saint-Jean-Cap-Ferrat
- Musée Clemenceau, Paris: Garden in Giverny
- Maison de Georges Clemenceau, Belebat: The Garden of Clemenceau and The Garden and the House
- Musée Marmottan Monet, Paris: Along the River and House of Sorel-Moussel
- Musée des Beaux-Arts de Rouen: Poplars along the River, Pivoines, and Claude Monet’s Garden
- Musée des Augustins, Toulouse: The Garden and House of Claude Monet in Giverny
- Musée de la Cohue, Vannes: Le bassin, temps gris
- Musée A.G. Poulain, Vernon: House of Claude Monet, L’étang de Giverny, Beach in Normandy, and The Cabbage
- Fondation Monet in Giverny
- Minneapolis Institute of Art, Minneapolis, MN, USA: Landscape, Snow Effect; le Val near Giverny, 1888

== Works ==
Partial list of Blanche Hoschedé Monet's works:

- The Banks of the Seine, oil on canvas
- Claude Monet's Garden at Giverny, oil on canvas
- A Corner of the Garden at Giverny in Spring, oil on canvas
- Flowers in a Copper Vase, oil on canvas
- The Garden, oil on cardboard
- The Garden, 1904, oil on canvas
- The Garden at Giverny, 1927, oil on canvas
- Garden Flowers, 1930, oil on canvas
- The Gardens of Claude Monet in Giverny, oil on canvas
- Giverny: Rose Bush and Lilies, oil on canvas
- Haystack, oil on canvas
- The Japanese Bridge in Monet's Garden, oil on canvas
- The Lake, oil on canvas
- The Monet Rose Garden, oil on canvas
- Monet's Rose Garden at Giverny, oil on canvas
- A Road near Giverny, oil on canvas
- Still Life with Asters, Pitcher and Apples, oil on canvas
- Water Lilies, 1946, oil on canvas
- Water Lilies, oil on canvas
- Water Lilies at Giverny, oil on canvas
- Willows by the Pond in Giverny, oil on canvas

== Popular culture ==
A movie entitled Monet, la lumière blanche, directed by Chantal Picault, will be produced including the following actors:

- Claude Monet played by Gérard Depardieu
- Blanche Hoschedé Monet played by Sandrine Bonnaire
- Georges Clemenceau played by Michel Galabru
