= Le Voltaire (newspaper) =

Le Voltaire (French pronunciation: [lə vɔltɛʁ]) was a French daily newspaper first published on 5 July 1878. It ceased publication in the 1930s.

Nicknamed Le Figaro républicain, the paper was created in order to support Gambetta, the leader of the Republican Union, the party of moderate radicals.

Its founding editor was Aurélien Scholl. The first issue announced that it was "daily, political, republican, satirical". The paper's name represented anticlericalism and it announced that "We know the potential dangers of the cowl-wearers." An editorial in the first issue said:

We want to disperse, once and for all, in this free and enlightened world of our republic, the last fatalities and the last remains of ignorance, which is the nemesis of the spirit, and of hatred, which is the enemy of the heart.

Writers who contributed to the paper included Émile Zola, the Goncourt brothers, Guillaume Livet, and Paul Alexis. The paper also published longer works in serial form, including those of Zola and George Moore (A Mummer's Wife as La Femme du cabotin, July–October 1886).

A guide to Parisian newspapers published in 1882 described several of its writers as "some of the first journalists in France", one "brilliant" and another "teeming with imagination". It included Le Voltaire under the heading "Republican newspapers" and noted that it had published a long series of articles in favor of legalizing divorce.
