= Jean Monet (son of Claude Monet) =

French chemist (1867–1914)

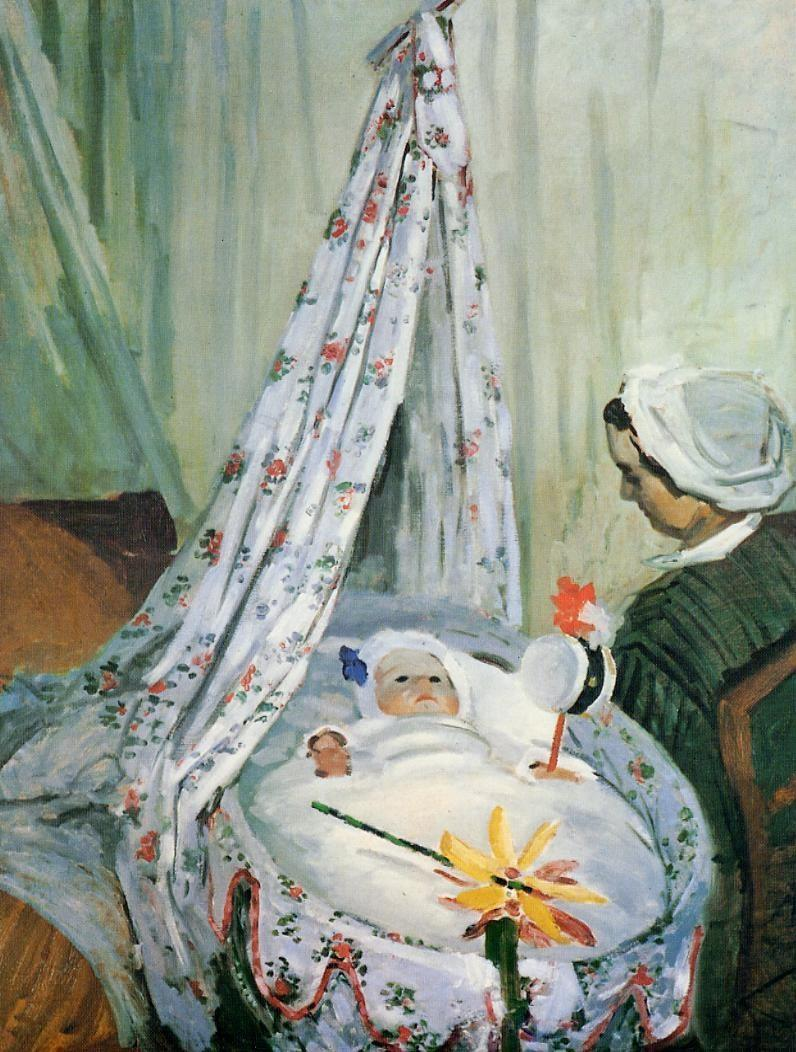
- Jean Monet in His Cradle, of the baby with Julie Vellay
- Born: August 8, 1867; Paris
- Died: February 10, 1914 (aged 46)
- Occupation: Chemist
- Spouse: Blanche Hoschedé (m. 1897)
- Parent(s): Claude Monet; Camille Doncieux
- Relatives: Michel Monet (brother)

Jean Monet (August 8, 1867 – February 10, 1914) was the elder son of French Impressionist artist Claude Monet and Camille Doncieux Monet and the brother of Michel Monet. He was the subject of several paintings by his father and married his step-sister, Blanche Hoschedé.

== Early life ==
Jean Monet was born to Camille Doncieux and Claude Monet on August 8, 1867. During that summer Claude Monet was staying at his father's house in Sainte-Adresse, a suburb of Le Havre. Monet went to Paris for the birth of Jean and returned to Sainte-Adresse on the 12th of the month.

The first portrait that Monet made of his son was of the four-month-old Jean Monet in His Cradle. Alongside Jean was a woman Julie Vellay, a companion of Camille Pissarro, rather than his mother. According to Mary Mathews Gedo, author of Monet and his Muse: Camile Monet in the Artist's Life:

The identification of Jean's attendant as someone other than his mother seems entirely consistent with what would prove to be Monet's future insistence on depicting Camille as 'unmother'. Mother and son were only shown in the same physical space in one painting during the Argenteuil years by Monet, The Luncheon.

In 1868, after having left Paris to escape creditors and find more affordable housing, the three moved to Gloton, a small scenic village near Bennecourt. They were thrown out of the inn they were staying in for non-payment. Camille and Jean were able to stay with someone in the country, while Monet tried to obtain monies for survival. However, without money for a medical treatment, Jean became quite ill. After a dramatic period experienced by Camille and Jean, Claude was able to obtain funds for housing for his family in Le Havre.

His parents were married on June 28, 1870.

When Jean was a young child his mother and father had fled France during the Franco-Prussian War. They returned by the summer of 1872 when Claude painted his five-year-old son on a hobby horse in the garden of the home the family rented in Argenteuil near Paris. Claude Monet kept the painting, and never exhibited it, throughout his life.

Paintings by Claude Monet

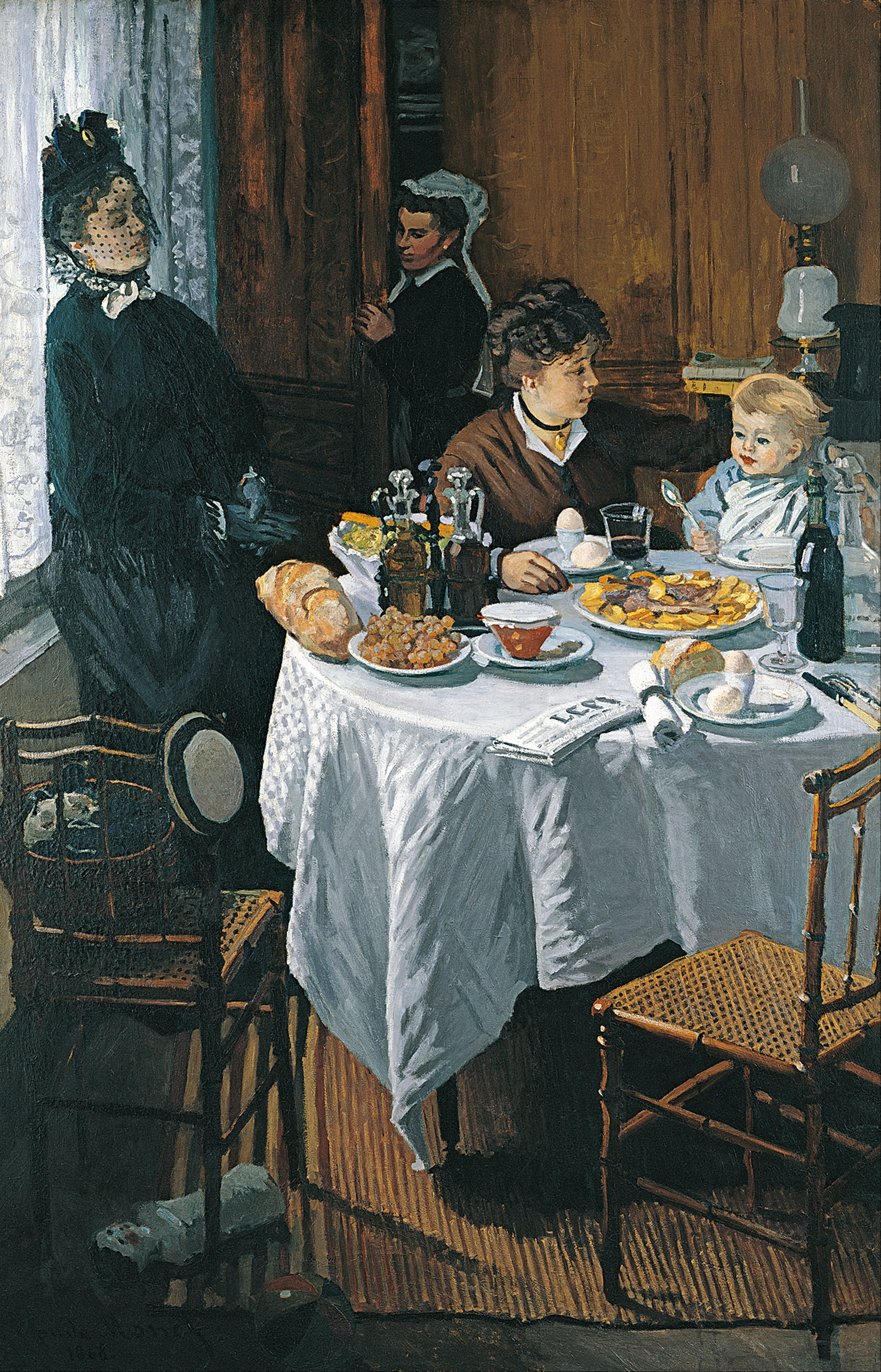
The Luncheon, Camille Doncieux and Jean Monet

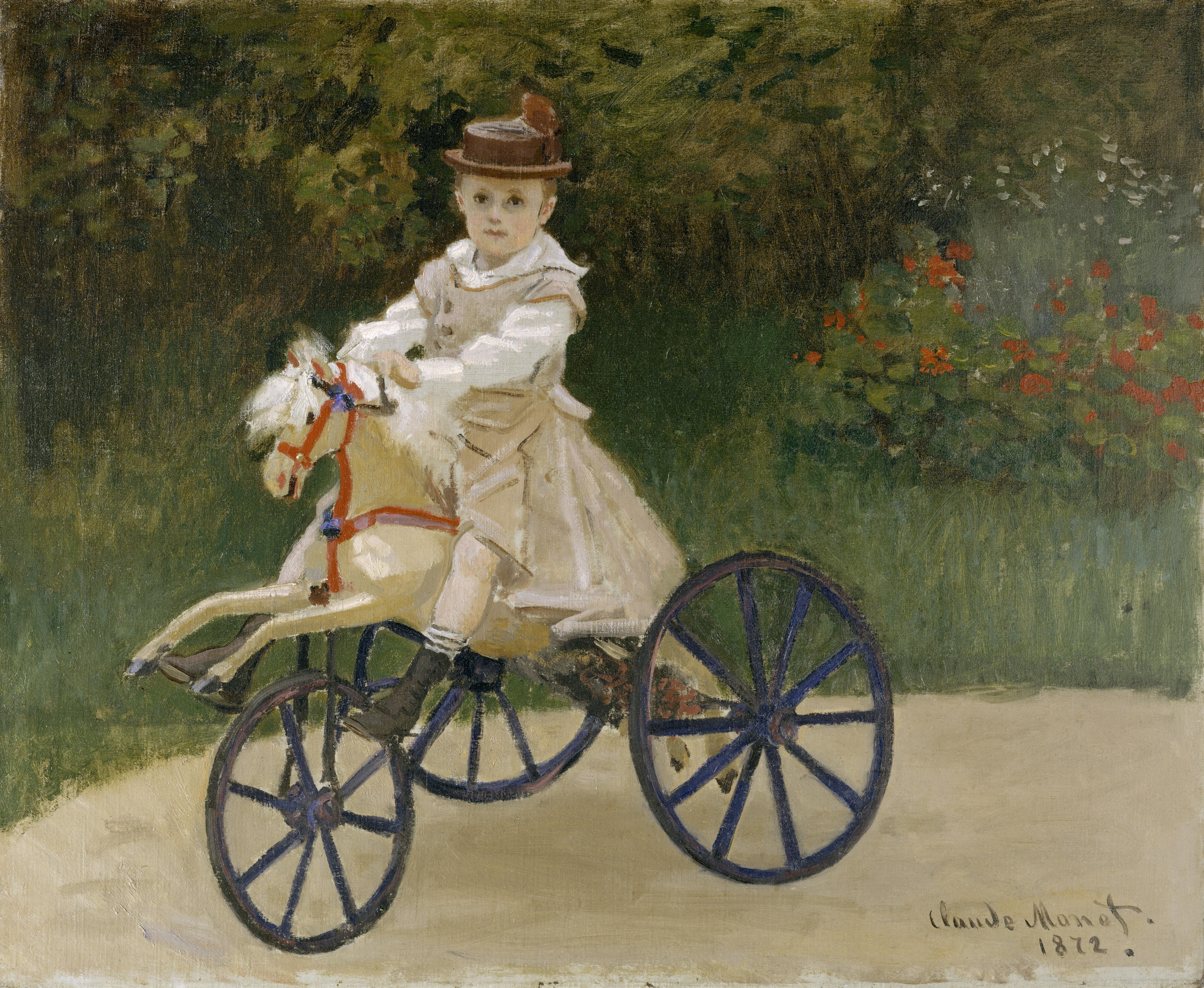
Jean Monet on his Hobby Horse, 1872, Metropolitan Museum of Art

== Education ==
He trained to be a chemist in Switzerland.

== Marriage ==
Monet married his step-sister, the painter Blanche Hoschedé, in 1897. They lived in Rouen, where Jean worked for his uncle Léon Monet as a chemist, and Beaumont-le-Roger until 1913.

The couple visited Giverny on weekends.

== Death ==
Jean suffered an illness for a period of time and died on February 10, 1914. (Note: The Metropolitan Museum of Art stated that he died in 1913.)

== Paintings by his father ==
Paintings by Claude Monet of his son:

- Jean Monet in His Cradle
- Jean Monet Sleeping, 1867-1868
- Child with a Cup: Portrait of Jean Monet, 1868
- The Luncheon, 1868-1869
- Portrait of Jean Monet Wearing a Hat with a Pompom, 1870
- Jean Monet on his Hobby Horse, 1872
- Camille and Jean Monet in the Garden at Argenteuil , 1873
- Camille in the Garden with Jean and His Nurse, 1873
- Jean in the artist's house, 1875
- Woman with a Parasol - Madame Monet and Her Son, 1875
- Jean Monet, 1880

== Gallery ==
=== Paintings by Claude Monet ===
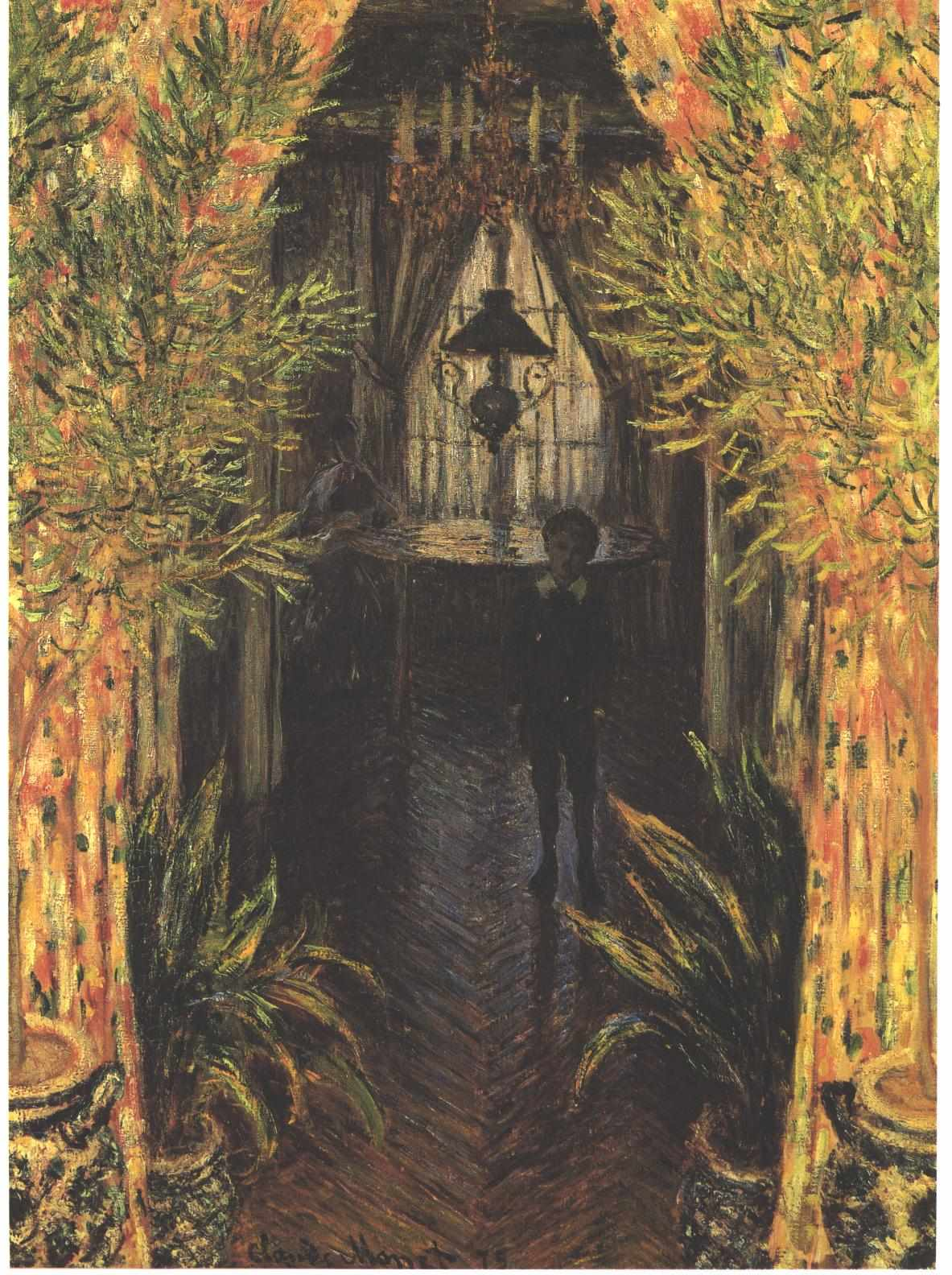
Jean in the artist's house, 1875

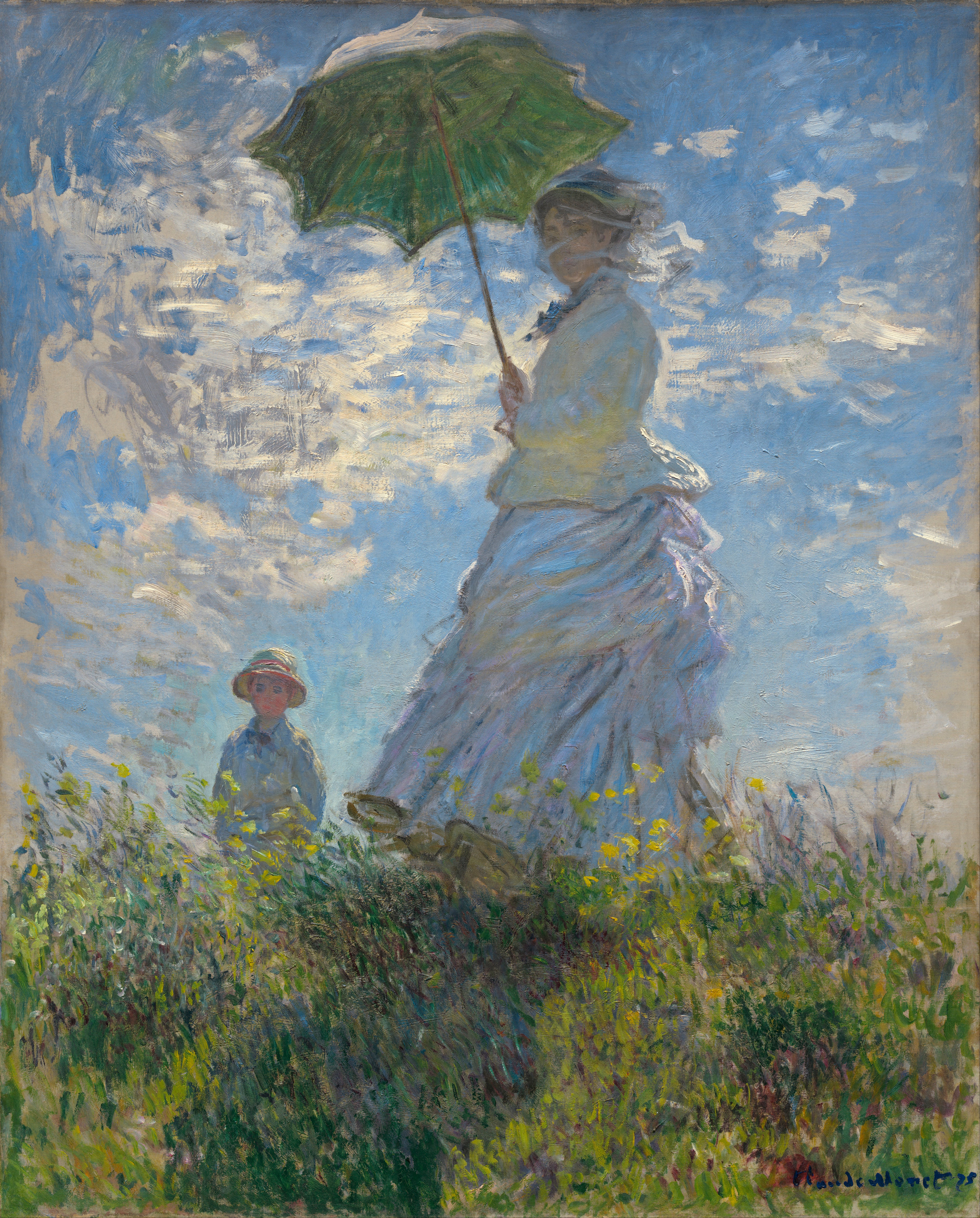
Woman with a Parasol - Madame Monet and Her Son, 1875, National Gallery of Art

=== Paintings by other artists ===
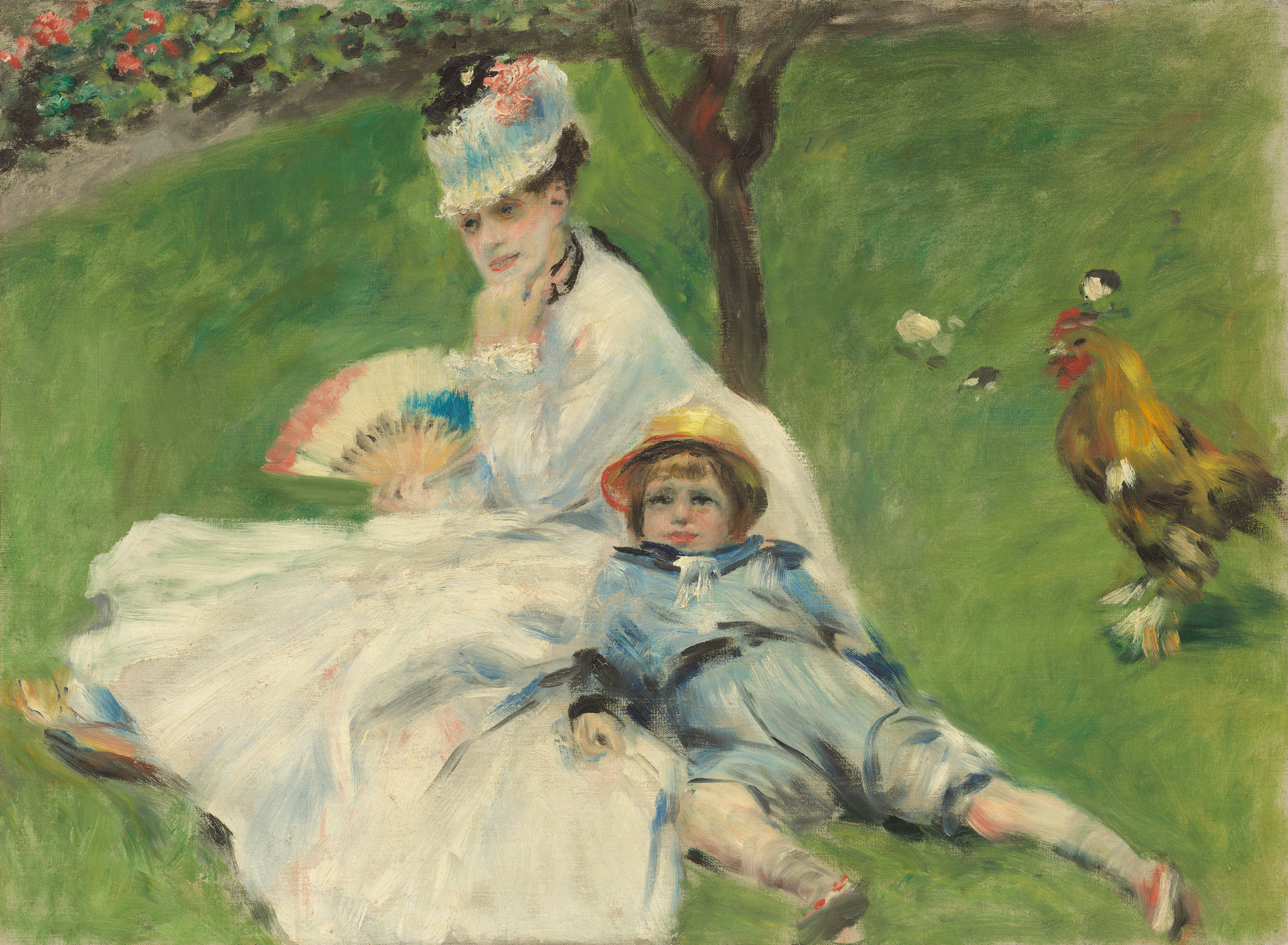
Pierre-Auguste Renoir, Madame Monet and her son, National Gallery of Art

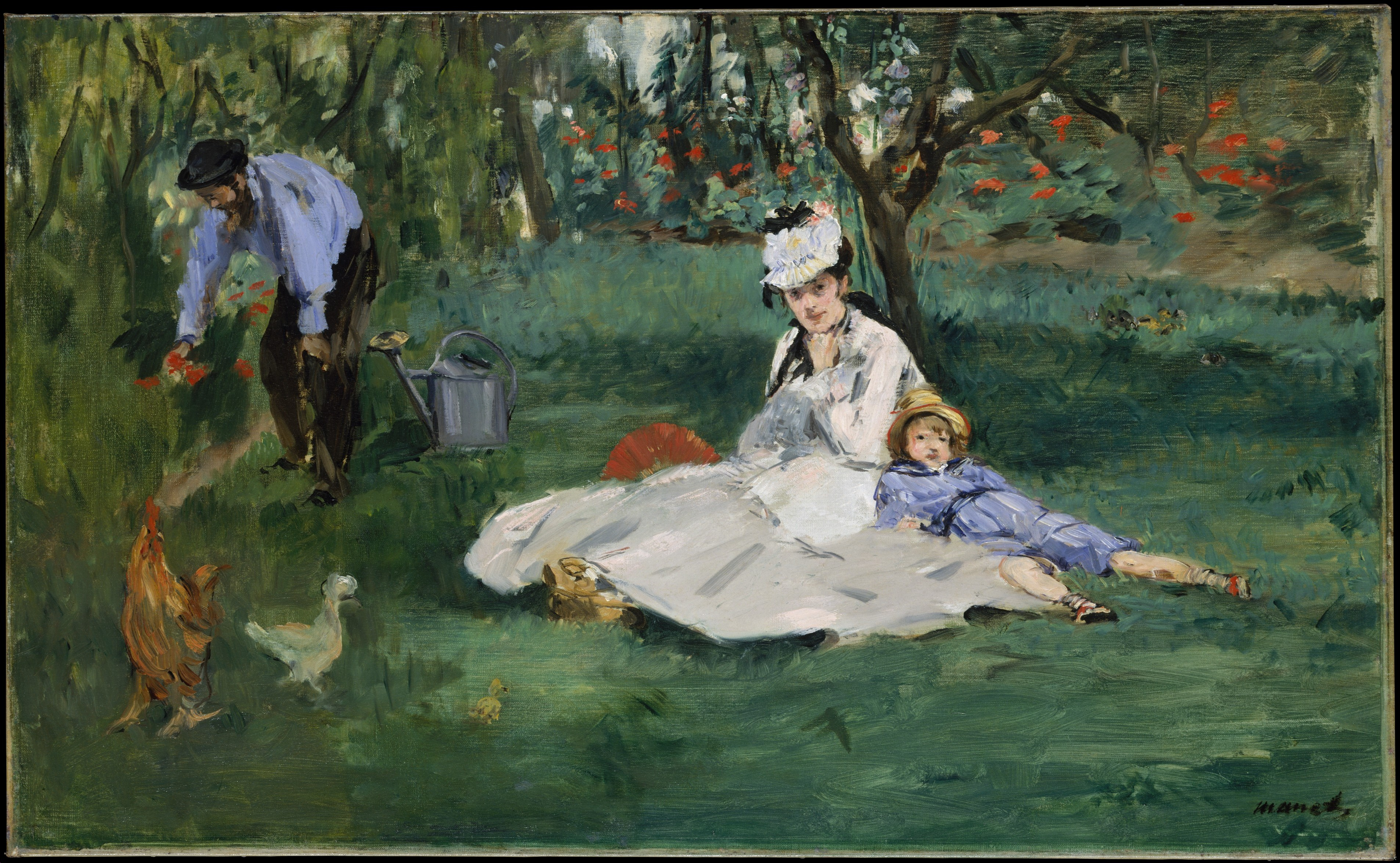
Édouard Manet, The Monet Family in Their Garden at Argenteuil, Metropolitan Museum of Art
